= List of planning journals =

This is a list of notable peer-reviewed academic journals related to urban, regional, land-use, transportation and environmental planning and to urban studies, regional science.

== Journals ==
=== Urban and regional planning ===
- Australian Planner
- Built Environment
- Cities
- Journal of Planning Education and Research
- Journal of Planning Literature
- Journal of the American Planning Association
- Town Planning Review

=== Urban studies ===
- Articulo – Journal of Urban Research
- Children, Youth and Environments
- City
- City and Community
- Environment & Urbanization
- International Journal of Urban and Regional Research
- Journal of Urban Affairs
- Revista INVI
- Urban Affairs Review
- Urban Geography
- Urban Studies

=== Regional science and economic geography ===
- Annals of Regional Science
- European Urban and Regional Studies
- International Regional Science Review
- Journal of Regional Science
- Journal of Rural Studies
- Journal of Urban Economics
- Land Economics
- Papers in Regional Science
- Regional Science Policy and Practice
- Regional Studies
- Spatial Economic Analysis
- Transactions of the Institute of British Geographers

=== Land use and environmental planning ===
- Environment and Planning A: Economy and Space
- Environment and Planning B: Urban Analytics and City Science
- Environment and Planning C: Politics and Space
- Environment and Planning D: Society and Space
- Journal of Environmental Assessment Policy and Management
- Journal of Land Use and Environmental Law
- Journal of Water Resources Planning and Management
- Landscape and Urban Planning
- Local Environment
- Sustainability

=== Transportation planning ===
- Journal of Transport and Land Use
- Journal of Transport Geography
- Transportation
- Transportation Research Part A: Policy and Practice
- Transportation Research Part D: Transport and Environment

=== Planning theory, policy and governance ===
- Commonwealth Journal of Local Governance
- Disasters
- Futures
- International Journal of Sociology and Social Policy
- Planning Theory
- Third World Quarterly

=== Planning and urban history ===
- Journal of Planning History
- Journal of Urban History
- Planning Perspectives
- Urban History

== See also ==
- List of environmental social science journals
- List of environmental journals
