= Niles Maurice Hansen =

American economist

- Born: January 2, 1937 (age 89); Louisville, Kentucky, United States
- Occupation: Economist
- Employer: University of Texas at Austin
- Known for: Regional and urban economics

Niles Maurice Hansen (born January 2, 1937) is an American economist. He was Leroy G. Denman Jr. Regents Professor of Economics at the University of Texas at Austin, specializing in regional and urban economics. He was President (1979–80) and Fellow (1993) of the Southern Regional Science Association; President (1981) of the Western Regional Science Association; and President (1991–92) of the North American Regional Science Council. In 2004 the North American Regional Science Council presented him the Walter Isard Award “for his distinguished scholarly achievements in the field of regional science."

== Research interests ==
Hansen's research focused on the role of economic and social infrastructure in regional development; trans-border cooperation mechanisms in Europe and along the U.S.–Mexico border; population migration and urban size issues; and small and medium-size enterprises in innovative regional networks.

== Early life and education ==
Hansen was born on January 2, 1937, to Danish parents in Louisville, Kentucky, where he grew up. He graduated from Louisville Male High School. He earned a B.A. at Centre College in 1958 and a Ph.D. in Economics at Indiana University Bloomington in 1963. His doctoral dissertation research on municipal infrastructure investment was carried out at Ghent University, Belgium, under a Ford Foundation Dissertation Fellowship.

== Academic career ==
Hansen joined the faculty at the University of Texas at Austin in 1963. From 1964 to 1965, he was a National Science Foundation Postdoctoral Fellow at the University of Paris, studying French regional planning.

Between 1968 and 1975, he published numerous books, articles, and government reports concerning the integration of rural and urban infrastructure and labor markets. His work during this period was supported by grants from the National Science Foundation, the U.S. Department of Labor, the U.S. Department of Commerce, the Office of Economic Opportunity, and the Ford Foundation.

In early 1975, he worked as a consultant to the World Bank on infrastructure and urbanization in Pakistan. In 1986, again as a World Bank consultant, he traveled to South Korea to provide technical assistance in development planning.

From 1975 to 1977, Hansen was based at the International Institute for Applied Systems Analysis (IIASA) in Laxenburg, Austria, studying human settlement systems. A major part of his research there involved comparative analysis of border region policies in Europe, which he later extended to the U.S.–Mexico borderlands.

In 1982, with NSF support, he conducted further research on European transboundary cooperation at the European Union in Strasbourg, France.

== Later work ==
Hansen's later research emphasized the role of small and medium-sized enterprises in regional development, especially in the context of flexible production and interfirm networking. His field studies focused on regions in southern France and Denmark.

== International engagement ==
Hansen participated in United Nations expert groups focused on population distribution in development planning, environmental planning, and urbanization strategies in Asia.

In 1987, he lectured in Turkey as a Fulbright 40th Anniversary Distinguished Fellow.

== Awards and legacy ==
In 1988, Hansen received the Dean's Award for Outstanding Classroom Performance at UT Austin. From 1985 to 1988, he was a member of the National Research Council Panel evaluating NSF graduate fellowship applications in behavioral and social sciences.

In 2000, he contributed to an international research group in Sweden examining global gateway cities, with a case study of Miami.

== Retirement ==
Hansen retired from the University of Texas at Austin in 2003. In retirement, he has focused on travel, exercise, and volunteer work, notably at the Lyndon B. Johnson Presidential Library and the Harry Ransom Center.
