= Kara Kockelman =

American transportation engineer

Kara M. Kockelman, Ph.D., P.E. (born 1969) is an American civil and transportation engineer, who is currently the Dewitt Greer Centennial Professor of Transportation Engineering at the University of Texas at Austin, previously the Clare Boothe Luce Professor of Civil Engineering, and a published author. Kockelman’s work focuses on transportation, and includes planning for future implementation of shared and autonomous vehicle systems, and policies like credit-based congestion pricing and urban growth boundaries.

== Education ==
Kockelman graduated from Palo Alto High School, in Palo Alto, California. She then attended the University of California, Berkeley, where she received her BS in civil engineering in 1991. She earned her MS in civil engineering in 1996, along with her MCP in city and regional planning. In 1998, she received her PhD in civil engineering from UC Berkeley.

== Career ==
Between her undergraduate and graduate studies, Kockelman served as a Peace Corps Volunteer in the rural Andean region of Ecuador, managing the construction of potable water systems and other sanitation infrastructure. In the fall of 1998, Kockelman accepted the position of Clare Boothe Luce Assistant Professor of civil engineering at the University of Texas at Austin, before advancing to Associate Professor in 2004. By 2009, she had become a full-time tenured professor in the Department of Civil, Architectural and Environmental Engineering.

As of 2015, Dr. Kockelman is a professor of Transportation Engineering at the University of Texas, Austin. She is a member of multiple standing committees of the Transportation Research Board. In 2025, she was named an MIT Mobility Initiative Senior Fellow.

== Work ==
Kockelman is an expert in transportation and emerging technologies, focusing on city infrastructure and automated vehicles. She is a champion for thoughtful applications of connected and automated vehicles, believing they can save thousands of lives, dramatically increase productivity, and save billions or even trillions of dollars.

Kockelman's work focuses on finding the best technology in the transportation sector, using modeling to predict how new vehicle technologies could affect populations in the future. This work is based on scenarios such as policy changes, economic situations, and technology costs. She and her colleagues also study differences in ownership of automated vehicles, such as private ownership, shared vehicles, and taxi services.

Kockelman has also done innovative work in credit-based congestion pricing, which reduces traffic congestion in a revenue-neutral way by charging peak-period drivers for the external costs of congestion and redistributing revenues equally to licensed drivers. She also does work in traffic safety, with several publications on predicting pedestrian crashes, crash trends, and frequency and severity.

Kockelman's publication record consists of more than 200 refereed publications. Kockelman has had papers published in multiple academic transportation journals, such as Transportation, Journal of Urban Planning and Development, Transportation Research, Transportation Research Record and the Journal of the Transportation Research Forum. According to Google Scholar (as of May 2026), her papers have been cited 40,888 times in scholarly publications.

Kockelman is the lead organizer of transportation's first annual carbon-free, cost-free conference called [https://bridgingtransport.org/ Bridging Transportation Researchers], currently in its eighth year. BTR seeks to bring researchers around the globe together each year while saving carbon and cost.

Outside of academia, Kockelman's work has also been published via mainstream media outlets that include Texas Public Radio stations and magazines such as Mother Jones and Newsweek.

== Awards ==
In 1991, Kockelman was awarded U.C. Berkeley's University Medal, recognizing her as "Most Distinguished Graduate" of her 5,300-person graduating class. In 1999, she won the 13th annual Charles M. Tiebout Prize in Regional Science, awarded by the Western Regional Science Association, recognizing the best graduate student paper in regional science.

In 2002, MIT's Technology Review magazine identified Kockelman as one of the world's "Top 100 Innovators Under 35". That same year, the Council of University Transportation Center awarded her its inaugural "Young Faculty Award", and she was named to the National Academy of Engineering’s Gallery of Women in Engineering.

In November 2006, Kockelman received the Geoffrey J.D. Hewings Award, presented by the Regional Science Association International.

In 2007, Kockelman received the Harland Bartholomew Award from the American Society of Civil Engineers. In 2010, Kockelman received the Walter L. Huber Civil Engineering Research Prize from ASCE. In 2014, ASCE awarded her the James Laurie Prize in transportation engineering. In August 2014, Kockelman received a Google Research Award to pursue research on the topic "Anticipating & Mitigating the Latent Demand Effects of Self Driving Vehicles: A Role for Data-Driven Modeling & Credit-Based Congestion Pricing." In February 2020, ASCE awarded her the Bechtel Energy Award.

In July 2020, Kockelman was voted one of Vulog's Top 20 Influential Women in Mobility. In addition, she was the recipient of the Walter Isard Award for Scholarly Achievement by the North American Regional Science Council in November 2020, and was ranked 32 out of 21,274 authors among the Top 2% in the Logistics and Transportation field in December 2020. Dr. Kockelman also served as the North American Regional Science Council President in 2020.

In 2021, Kockelman received the Transportation Research Forum’s 2021 Distinguished Researcher Award and the Fellows Award, by the Regional Science Association International. In addition, she delivered a lecture titled “Large-Scale Shared Autonomous Vehicle Simulations with Geofences, Stop Aggregation, and Parking Restrictions” at Johns Hopkins University for the Richard J. Carroll Memorial Lectureship in Civil Engineering in March 2021.

In 2025, Kockelman was named a MIT Mobility Initiative Senior Fellow.
