= Julie Le Gallo =

French economist

- Education: University of Burgundy
- Known for: Spatial econometrics, regional convergence analysis
- Awards: Fellow, Spatial Econometrics Association (2010); Richard Musgrave Prize (2025)
- Scientific career
- Fields: Economics
- Workplaces: Institut Agro Dijon; University of Franche-Comté; University of Burgundy
- Thesis: Disparités géographiques et convergence des régions européennes : une approche par l'économétrie spatiale (2002)

Julie Le Gallo is a French economist who is a full professor of economics at L'Institut Agro Dijon and a member of the Center for Economics and Sociology Applied to Agriculture and Rural Areas (CESAER), a joint research unit of the National Research Institute for Agriculture, Food and Environment (INRAE) and Institut Agro Dijon. She is known for her work in spatial econometrics, economic geography and regional economics. She is among the most cited French economists according to the IDEAS ranking.

== Education and career ==
Le Gallo earned her doctorate in economic analysis and policy from the University of Burgundy in 2002, with a dissertation on geographic disparities and convergence between European regions using spatial econometric methods. In 2006 she passed the French national agrégation competition for full professorships in economics (premier concours d'agrégation de l'enseignement supérieur en sciences économiques).

She began her career as a teaching assistant at the University of Burgundy (1998–2002) and spent 2002–2003 as a visiting scholar at the Regional Economics Applications Laboratory of the University of Illinois at Urbana–Champaign. From 2003 to 2006 she was an associate professor at the Montesquieu University of Bordeaux, before being appointed full professor at the University of Franche-Comté, where she taught from 2006 to 2015. She joined AgroSup Dijon as a full professor in 2015 and, following its reorganization, has been a full professor at L'Institut Agro Dijon since 2022.

== Research ==
Le Gallo's research lies at the intersection of spatial econometrics, economic geography, regional economics, housing economics and local public economics. She develops and applies spatial statistical methods to study territorial inequalities, housing markets, fiscal federalism and the evaluation of territorial public policies.

A substantial part of her early work, much of it with co-authors such as Cem Ertur, Catherine Baumont and Sandy Dall'Erba, applied spatial econometric techniques to the analysis of regional economic convergence and the effects of European structural funds across the regions of the European Union. Her later research has examined housing and rental markets, including studies of rent control in Paris and the effects of short-term rental platforms, as well as urban densification, tax competition among municipalities and the evaluation of public transport investment.

== Editorial work and recognition ==
Le Gallo became editor-in-chief of the Journal of Geographical Systems in 2025 and joined the Journal of Regional Science as a co-editor in 2026. She previously served as a co-editor of Papers in Regional Science (2019–2024) and of Spatial Economic Analysis (2007–2021), and as a co-editor of the Revue d'économie régionale et urbaine (2010–2015).

In 2010 she was elected a fellow of the Spatial Econometrics Association. In 2025 she received the Richard Musgrave Prize for the best paper published in the National Tax Journal, for work on tax competition and intermunicipal cooperation written with David R. Agrawal and Marie-Laure Breuillé. Earlier honours include the Philippe Aydalot dissertation prize (2003) awarded by the French-language regional science association.

Her research has been quoted in French media.

== Selected publications ==
- Le Gallo, Julie; Ertur, Cem (2003). "Exploratory spatial data analysis of the distribution of regional per capita GDP in Europe, 1980–1995". Papers in Regional Science. 82 (2): 175–201.
- Le Gallo, Julie (2004). "Space-time analysis of GDP disparities among European regions: A Markov chains approach". International Regional Science Review. 27 (2): 138–163.
- Ertur, Cem; Le Gallo, Julie; Baumont, Catherine (2006). "The European regional convergence process, 1980–1995: Do spatial regimes and spatial dependence matter?". International Regional Science Review. 29 (1): 3–34.
- Le Gallo, Julie; Dall'Erba, Sandy (2006). "Evaluating the temporal and spatial heterogeneity of the European convergence process, 1980–1999". Journal of Regional Science. 46 (2): 269–288.
- Dall'Erba, Sandy; Le Gallo, Julie (2008). "Regional convergence and the impact of European structural funds over 1989–1999: A spatial econometric analysis". Papers in Regional Science. 87 (2): 219–244.
- Agrawal, David R.; Breuillé, Marie-Laure; Le Gallo, Julie (2025). "Tax competition with intermunicipal cooperation". National Tax Journal. 78 (1): 5–43.
- Debarsy, Nicolas; Le Gallo, Julie (2025). "Identification of spatial spillovers: Do's and don'ts". Journal of Economic Surveys. 39 (5): 2152–2173.
