= History of Regional Science and the Regional Science Association International =

2003 Book by Walter Isard

- Cover
- Author: Walter Isard
- Original title: History of Regional Science and the Regional Science Association International: The Beginnings and Early History
- Language: English
- Subject: Geography, economic geography
- Genre: Non-fiction
- Publisher: Springer Science and Business Media
- Publication date: 2003
- Publication place: United States
- Pages: 267
- ISBN: 978-3540009344

History of Regional Science and the Regional Science Association International: The Beginnings and Early History is a book by American economist and regional scientist Walter Isard. It was published in 2003 by Springer. Isard emphasizes that the formal establishment of a society associated with the field doesn't capture the true beginning, which is influenced by a specific context, events, and interactions among individuals. The author aims to unravel the where, when, and why of regional science's development, highlighting its dependence on particular circumstances. The author touches on the potential for analytical advancements in the field and the opportunity for regional scientists to contribute to global and regional development problem-solving.

== Reviews ==
In his review, Trevor J. Barnes, acknowledged the historical significance of Walter Isard's book. Barnes appreciated the inclusion of materials from the Regional Science archives and noted the author's dedication and ambition in building the Regional Science Association (RSA). Still, Barnes critiqued the book for lacking interpretation and providing minimal reflection, describing it as more of a scrapbook with an underlying triumphalism. Despite recognizing Isard's pivotal role in the RSA's establishment, Barnes noted the absence of an explanation for its success or acknowledgment of its subsequent decline.

Ron Johnston acknowledged Isard's significant role in developing interdisciplinary work focused on spaces and regions, particularly in the aftermath of World War II. Isard faced challenges in uniting scholars from various disciplines, including resistance from economists and limited interest from sociologists and political scientists. Despite the book's organizational shortcomings, Johnston recognized it as a fascinating document that highlights Isard's tireless efforts in establishing the Regional Science Association and Research Institute, making a lasting impact on spatial analysis and geographical research.

== See also ==
- Regional Science Association International
