= Kirsten Simonsen =

Danish geographer, sociologist (born 1946)

Kirsten Simonsen (born 1946) is a Danish geographer and sociologist, professor emerita and she consulted for the Danish Ministry of Environment for several years. Her research has concerned social and cultural geography. She was granted an honorary doctorate by Stockholm University.

== Biography ==
Simonsen was born in 1946 and graduated from the University of Copenhagen with her Bachelor's degree (1972) and PhD (1976). At Roskilde University she earned her habilitation degree (1993).

=== Professor ===
Her first research fellowship was at the University of Copenhagen (1973–1978). She was named a professor (1995–1998) at the University of Oslo, Department of Human Geography. She began teaching at Roskilde University in 1996, Department of Geography and International Development Studies (since 2006, it has been called the Department of Environmental, Social and Spatial Change). During that time (2006–2011), she was also a professor at the University of Tromsø (now called The Arctic University of Norway), Faculty of Social Science.

She has taught general social geography and cultural geography to undergraduate and graduate students, and she taught doctoral courses in geography and social theory, philosophy of science and methodology, urban studies, space and place. She is a Professor Emerita in the Department of People and Technology Mobility, Space, Place and Urban Studies at Roskilde University. She has directed more than a dozen dissertations for students at universities in Denmark and Norway.

From 1983 to 1986, she served as a consultant to the Danish Ministry of Environment.

Simonsen's research concentrates on both social and cultural geography; Her research explores everyday urban life and social practices and the relationships among practice, body and space. She explores "a general interest in the development of social ontologies and the philosophical basis of geography." In her discussions, she includes the study of everyday life, culture and identity as well as Postcolonialism and minorities, and the history of ideas in geography.

=== Editor ===
Simonsen has been an editor for several geography journals: Progress in Human Geography, Transactions of the Institute of British Geographers, Geografiska Annaler, The Canadian Geographer, European Urban and Regional Studies, Social and Cultural Geography, Environment and Planning A, Qualitative Research, GeoJournal.

== Honors ==
- Awarded an honorary doctorate by Stockholm University (2010).

== Selected publications ==
- Simonsen, Kirsten. "Urban space and everyday life: A personal theoretical trajectory within Nordic social and cultural geography." In Socio-Spatial Theory in Nordic Geography: Intellectual Histories and Critical Interventions, pp. 253-271. Cham: Springer International Publishing, 2022.
- Simonsen, Kirsten. “Encountering Racism in the (Post-) Welfare State: Danish Experiences.” Geografiska Annaler: Series B, Human Geography, 2015. doi:10.1111/GEOB.12076.
- Simonsen, Kirsten. "In quest of a new humanism: Embodiment, experience and phenomenology as critical geography." Progress in Human Geography 37, no. 1 (2013): 10-26.
- Simonsen, Kirsten. "Practice, spatiality and embodied emotions: An outline of a geography of practice." Human affairs 2 (2007): 168-181.
- Simonsen, Kirsten. "Differential spaces of critical geography." Geoforum 35, no. 5 (2004): 525-528.
- Simonsen, Kirsten. "On being 'in-between': social and cultural geography in Denmark." Social & Cultural Geography 4, no. 2 (2003): 255-267.
