= Genevieve Giuliano =

American urban planning and transportation scholar

- Born: Berkeley, California, U.S.
- Known for: Research on land use and transportation
- Title: Distinguished Professor Emerita

Academic background
- Education: University of California, Berkeley (BA); University of California, Irvine (PhD)
- Thesis: Transit performance: the effect of environmental factors (1980)

Academic work
- Discipline: Urban planning, transportation planning, regional science
- Sub-discipline: Travel behavior, land use and transportation, urban freight
- Institutions: University of Southern California; University of California, Irvine

Genevieve Giuliano is an American urban planning and transportation scholar. She is Distinguished Professor Emerita at the USC Price School of Public Policy. She previously held USC's endowed Margaret and John Ferraro Chair in Effective Local Government and served as dean of the Price School in 2024.

Giuliano's research examines the relationships among transportation, land use, travel behavior, metropolitan development, and public policy, with later work addressing urban freight and transportation emissions. The Los Angeles Times described her in 1989 as a nationally known transportation planner whose research concerned travel patterns and their public-policy implications.

Giuliano directed the METRANS Transportation Consortium, a joint research center of USC and California State University, Long Beach, from 2001 to 2022. She chaired the executive committee of the Transportation Research Board (TRB) in 2003.

== Early life and education ==
Giuliano was born in Berkeley, California. She attended the University of California, Berkeley, from 1961 to 1965 and earned a bachelor's degree in history. She later studied at the University of California, Irvine, receiving a PhD in social science, with a concentration in transportation, in 1980. Her dissertation was titled Transit performance: the effect of environmental factors.

== Career ==
After completing her doctorate, Giuliano remained at UC Irvine's Institute of Transportation Studies as a postdoctoral researcher and then as a research specialist. She also taught in UC Irvine's School of Social Sciences and extension program and served as an assistant to the institute's director. She joined USC in 1988 as an associate professor in its School of Urban Planning and Development and was promoted to professor in 1997.

At USC, Giuliano directed the Lusk Center Research Institute from 1992 to 1998 and served as senior associate dean for research and technology from 2005 to 2015. She was appointed to the Margaret and John Ferraro Chair in Effective Local Government in 2009. USC named her a Distinguished Professor in 2023, one of the university's highest academic distinctions.

Giuliano became director of METRANS in 2001. During her tenure the center grew from a small operation to one conducting about $8 million in research annually. She stepped down in 2022 after more than 20 years and was succeeded by Marlon Boarnet. In April 2024, USC announced that she would become interim dean of the Price School on July 1, following Dana Goldman's departure. Her term ended when Christopher Boone became dean on January 1, 2025. She subsequently became Distinguished Professor Emerita.

== Research ==
Giuliano's early scholarship questioned simple assumptions about how transportation investments shape cities and how changes to urban form affect driving. In a 1989 review in Environment and Planning A, she observed that empirical research often failed to support established theories of the land-use–transportation relationship. She attributed the discrepancy to changes in urban structure during the preceding three decades and called for theories that better reflected contemporary metropolitan conditions.

She has also studied who benefits from transportation policy. Her research has addressed mobility among low-income travelers, differences in travel behavior by gender, and disparities in access to employment. In a 2005 article, she found that public transit accounted for only a small share of travel by low-income households and that regular transit users had the lowest level of mobility among the groups studied. The paper recommended improving frequency and quality in high-demand markets, finding more effective service models in low-demand markets, and expanding service for off-peak and reverse commutes.

In a 2011 lecture at UC Berkeley, Giuliano argued that U.S. transit investments had not achieved broad goals such as increasing transit's market share, restructuring cities, or reducing congestion and air pollution. She contended that policy had paid too little attention to transit-dependent riders while trying to attract discretionary riders.

Giuliano and geographer Susan Hanson edited the third and fourth editions of The Geography of Urban Transportation, published in 2004 and 2017, respectively. It covers travel behavior, urban freight, transportation planning, communications technology, and climate change.

As international trade through the ports of Los Angeles and Long Beach grew, Giuliano's research increasingly examined freight activity and its local consequences. With Thomas O'Brien, she evaluated a California law intended to reduce truck queues and emissions at marine terminals. Their 2007 study found no evidence that the terminal appointment systems created under the law reduced queuing or transaction times. Her later projects included studying the relationship between land use and freight demand, the market for zero-emission trucks, local effects of truck traffic, and the use of archived real-time data for transportation-system analysis.

With Yougeng Lu, Giuliano used anonymized mobile-device data to study how Los Angeles County residents changed their travel during the COVID-19 pandemic. Their analysis found that residents of lower-income and ethnic-minority neighborhoods reduced work and shopping travel less during stay-at-home restrictions than residents of higher-income and White neighborhoods, consistent with having fewer opportunities to work remotely and less capacity to avoid exposure risk.

== Professional service and honors ==
Giuliano served on the TRB executive committee beginning in 2000, was its vice chair in 2002, and chaired it in 2003. She was president of the Western Regional Science Association in 2019. She has participated in National Research Council and National Academies policy studies, including work on interregional travel and the effects of climate change on transportation.

TRB selected Giuliano for its 2005 W. N. Carey Jr. Distinguished Service Award, which recognizes exemplary leadership and sustained service to the organization. The award was presented at TRB's January 2006 annual meeting.

In 2007 Giuliano received TRB's Thomas B. Deen Distinguished Lectureship, which recognizes career contributions in transportation research, and delivered a lecture titled "The Changing Landscape of Transportation Decision Making". The North American Regional Science Council gave Giuliano and Mark Partridge the 2017 Walter Isard Award for Scholarly Achievement, an award for career contributions to regional science. She was elected a fellow of the Regional Science Association International in 2022.

== Selected works ==
- Giuliano, Genevieve (1989). "Research Policy and Review 27. New Directions for Understanding Transportation and Land Use". Environment and Planning A: Economy and Space. 21 (2): 145–159. doi:10.1068/a210145.
- Giuliano, Genevieve (2005). "Low Income, Public Transit, and Mobility". Transportation Research Record. 1927 (1): 63–70. doi:10.1177/0361198105192700108.
- Giuliano, Genevieve; O'Brien, Thomas (2007). "Reducing Port-Related Truck Emissions: The Terminal Gate Appointment System at the Ports of Los Angeles and Long Beach". Transportation Research Part D: Transport and Environment. 12 (7): 460–473. doi:10.1016/j.trd.2007.06.004.
- Giuliano, Genevieve; Hanson, Susan, eds. (2017). The Geography of Urban Transportation (4th ed.). New York: Guilford Press. ISBN 978-1-4625-2965-0.
- Lu, Yougeng; Giuliano, Genevieve (2023). "Understanding Mobility Change in Response to COVID-19: A Los Angeles Case Study". Travel Behaviour and Society. 31: 189–201. doi:10.1016/j.tbs.2022.11.011.
