= Randall Crane =

American urban planner

Randall Crane is an American urban planner who is professor emeritus of the UCLA Luskin School of Public Affairs, where he taught since 1999. He was associate then editor-in-chief of the Journal of the American Planning Association, chair of the executive committee and director of Undergraduate Studies of the Luskin School, associate and acting director of the UCLA Institute of Transportation Studies, and department vice chair and director of PhD studies of the urban planning department, among other cross-campus administrative appointments.

After graduating from Paradise High School in the Northern California Sierra foothills in 1970, Crane received his B.A. from the University of California, Santa Barbara. Following a period as an anti-poverty worker in East Tennessee, he later earned a Ph.D. in urban studies & planning from MIT, where he studied micro, public and urban economics with Peter Diamond, Martin Feldstein, Eric Maskin, Daniel McFadden, Jerome Rothenberg, Paul Samuelson, Robert Solow, Larry Summers, and William Wheaton. His dissertation is titled, Essays in Local Public Finance, 1987.

From 1990 to 1999 he was assistant and associate professor of urban planning, economics, and transportation science at the University of California, Irvine.

From 1994 to 1995 he was visiting research fellow at the Center for U.S.-Mexican Studies at UC San Diego.

From 1989 to 1990 he was Fulbright Professor at El Colegio de México, Mexico City.

In 1990 he was resident advisor to the Harvard Institute for International Development Public Finance project in Jakarta, Indonesia.

In 2008, he was visiting scholar at Harvard University Graduate School of Design and a visiting fellow at the Lincoln Institute of Land Policy.

In 2016, he was senior scholar at the WRI Ross Center for Sustainable Cities, World Resources Institute, DC.

He also served as a development reform advisor, with field experience in China, Colombia, Guyana, Indonesia, Kenya, México, the Philippines, Thailand, Vietnam, and Yemen.

On November 8, 2022, Crane defeated incumbent Sat Tamaribuchi in the general election for Division 5 of the Municipal Water District of Orange County. On December 1, 2025, he was sworn in as a member of the Board of Directors of the Metropolitan Water District of Southern California.

== Selected publications ==
- Public Finance for Economic Development, in Financing for Economic Development, S. White and Z. Kotval, eds., M.E. Sharpe, 2013.
- The Oxford Handbook of Urban Planning, Oxford University Press, coedited with Rachel Weber, 2012.
- Planning for Access, in The Practice of Local Planning, G. Hack and E. Birch, et al., eds., ICMA Green Book, 2008 (with L. Takahashi).
- Is There a Quiet Revolution in Women's Travel? Revisiting the Gender Gap in Commuting, Journal of the American Planning Association 73, 2007.
- Public Finance Challenges for Chinese Urban Development, in Important Issues in the Era of Rapid Urbanization in China, C. Ding and Y. Song, eds., 2007
- Emerging Planning Challenges in Retail: The Case of Wal-Mart. Journal of the American Planning Association 71, 2005. (with M. Boarnet, D. Chatman and M. Manville)
- Does the Built Environment Influence Physical Activity? Examining the Evidence, a National Research Council Report of the Committee on Physical Activity, Health, Transportation, and Land Use. Washington, D.C.: National Academy Press, 2005
- Travel by Design: The Influence of Urban Form on Travel, Oxford University Press, 2001.
- The Influence of Land Use on Travel Behavior: Estimation and Specification Issues, Transportation Research Part A 35, 2001. (with M. Boarnet)
- The Impacts of Urban Form on Travel: An Interpretive Review, Journal of Planning Literature 15, 2000.
- Urban Development and Management Strategies for the Cities of Sana'a and Taiz, Yemen, Ministry of Housing, Construction and Urban Planning, Government of Yemen and the World Bank, 2000.
- The Impacts of Urban Form on Travel: An Interpretive Review, Journal of Planning Literature, 2000.
- Who Are the Suburban Homeless and What Do They Want? An Empirical Study of the Demand for Public Services, Journal of Planning Education & Research 18, 1998. (with L. Takahashi)
- Measuring Access to Basic Services in Global Cities: Descriptive and Behavioral Approaches, Journal of the American Planning Association 62, Spring 1996. (with A. Daniere)
- The Influence of Uncertain Job Location on Urban Form and the Journey to Work, Journal of Urban Economics 39, 1996.
- Cars and Drivers in the New Suburbs: Linking Access to Travel in Neotraditional Planning, Journal of the American Planning Association 62, Winter 1996.
- Water Markets, Market Reform, and the Urban Poor: Results from Jakarta, Indonesia, World Development 22, 1994.
- The Economics of Water Supply, Proceedings of the National Research Council/Mexican Academy of Sciences meeting on water problems in Mexico City, National Research Council, National Academies of Science, Washington, D.C., and Querétero, Mexico, 1992.
- On Welfare Measurement in Cities, Journal of Urban Economics 31, 1992.
- Price Specification and the Demand for Public Goods, Journal of Public Economics 43, 1990.
