= Amitrajeet A. Batabyal =

American economist and academic

- Born: September 6, 1965 (age 61); Chittaranjan, West Bengal, India
- Occupation: Economist

Academic background
- Education: Cornell University (BS); University of Minnesota (MS); University of California, Berkeley (PhD)

Academic work
- Discipline: Economics
- Sub-discipline: Regional economics; Natural resource economics; Environmental economics; International trade theory; Development economics
- Institutions: Rochester Institute of Technology

Amitrajeet A. Batabyal (born September 6, 1965) is an American economist and academic. He is a Distinguished Professor and the Arthur J. Gosnell Professor of Economics at the Rochester Institute of Technology (RIT).

== Early life and education ==
Batabyal was born in Chittaranjan, West Bengal, India. He grew up in Kolkata and Mumbai before moving to the United States in 1983. He earned a B.S. with Honors and Distinction in applied economics and business management from Cornell University in 1987, an M.S. in agricultural and applied economics from the University of Minnesota in 1990, and a Ph.D. in agricultural and resource economics from the University of California, Berkeley in 1994.

== Career ==
After completing his doctorate, Batabyal was a visiting assistant professor at the College of William & Mary from 1994 to 1995 before joining the faculty of Utah State University, where he taught until 2000.

Batabyal joined RIT in 2000 as the Arthur J. Gosnell Professor of Economics. He served as interim academic director of the Golisano Institute for Sustainability from 2009 to 2010 and held visiting appointments at Deakin University in 2009 and Monash University Malaysia in 2015. He was named a Distinguished Professor in 2022 and later became head of the Department of Sustainability and interim director of the Golisano Institute for Sustainability.

Batabyal received the Geoffrey J. D. Hewings Award in 2003 and the Moss Madden Memorial Medal in 2004. He received the Mattei Dogan Foundation Prize in 2013. He was elected a Fellow of the Regional Science Association International in 2021 and a Fellow of the United States Society for Ecological Economics in 2026.

== Research ==
Batabyal's research focuses on regional economics, natural resource and environmental economics, international trade theory, and development economics. He has used microeconomic theory and mathematical techniques in most of his research.

His early research examined the timing of land development under uncertain economic conditions, ecological resilience, ecosystem services, and environmental issues in regional science. In 1998, he published the paper "The Concept of Resilience: Retrospect and Prospect", which examined resilience in ecological and socioeconomic systems. In 2003, Batabyal co-authored a study examining the economic value of scarce ecosystem services, with lake eutrophication as a case study.

Batabyal has also applied economic modeling to arranged marriage, corruption, and other social issues. In 2001, he published a study examining decision making in arranged marriages. He has also studied how research and development and investment in technology affect regional economic growth, as well as the economic effects of climate change and environmental pollution.
