= UC Irvine Institute of Transportation Studies =

Research unit of UC Irvine

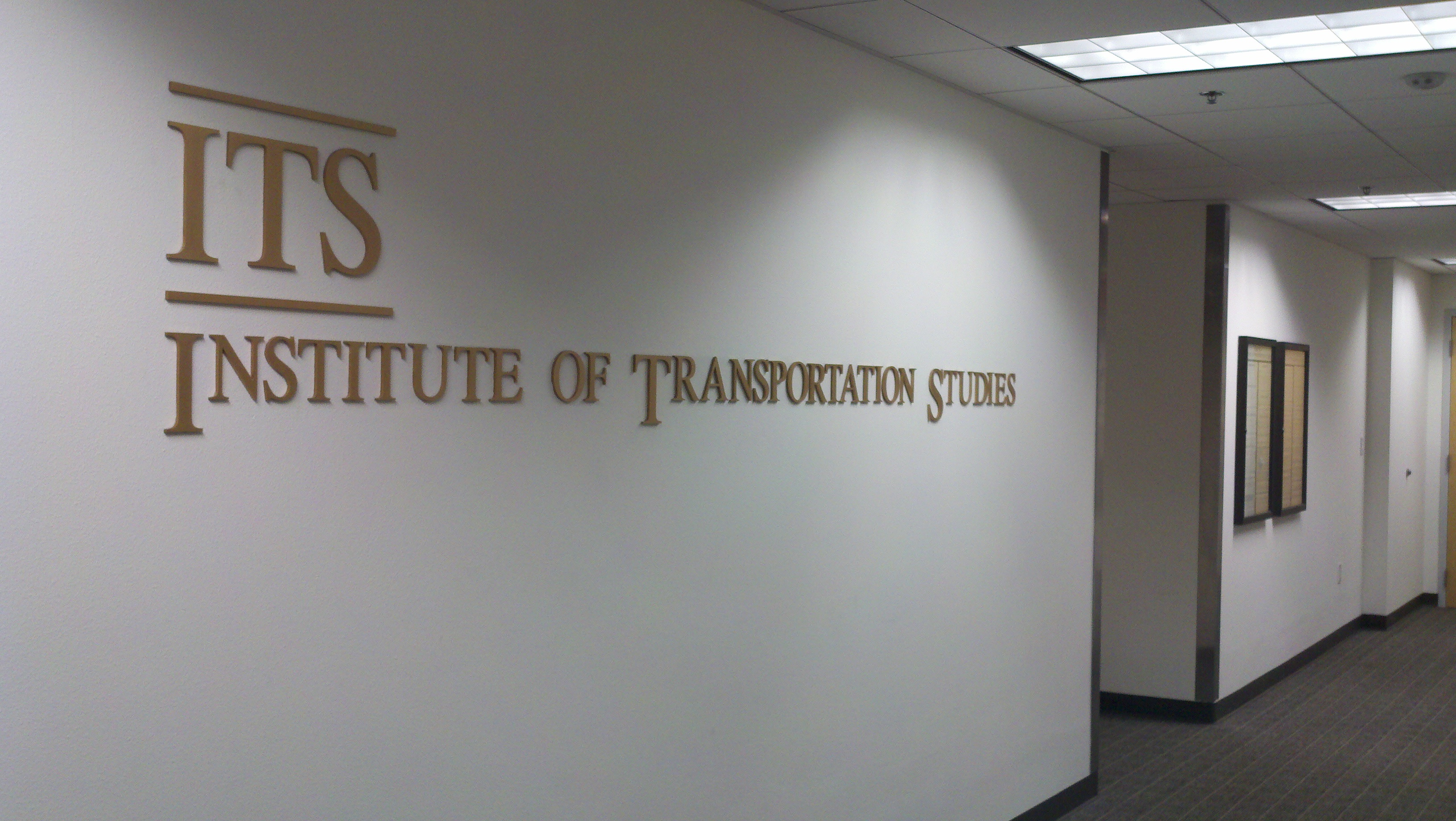
- 4000 Anteater Instruction and Research Building
- Type: Research Institute
- Established: 1974
- Director: Dr. Stephen Ritchie
- Location: University of California, Irvine; Institute of Transportation Studies; 4000 Anteater Instruction and Research Bldg. Irvine, CA 92697-3600 (949) 824-6564, Irvine, California, United States; 33°38′34″N 117°50′18″W
- Website: www.its.uci.edu

The UC Irvine Institute of Transportation Studies (ITS), is a University of California organized research unit with sister branches at UC Berkeley, UC Davis, and UCLA. ITS was established to foster research, education, and training in the field of transportation. UC Irvine ITS is located on the fourth floor of the Anteater Instruction and Research Building at University of California, Irvine's main Campus, and also houses the UC Irvine Transportation Science graduate studies program.

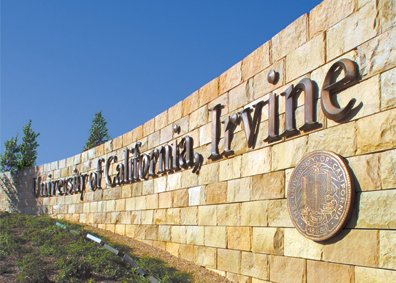

A fundamental goal of the institute is the stimulation of interdisciplinary research on contemporary transportation issues. ITS research involves faculty and students from the Henry Samueli School of Engineering, the School of Social Sciences, the School of Social Ecology, the Paul Merage School of Business, the School of Law, and the Bren School of Information and Computer Science. The institute also hosts visiting scholars from the U.S. and abroad to facilitate cooperative research and information exchange, and sponsors conferences and colloquia to disseminate research results.

== Research ==
Research at ITS covers a broad spectrum of transportation issues. Current funded research projects at Irvine focus upon:

- Intelligent transportation systems, particularly advanced transportation management systems
- Analysis and simulation of urban traffic networks
- Transportation system operations and control
- Artificial intelligence/expert systems in transportation
- Travel demand forecasting and analysis of complex travel behavior
- Transportation/land use interactions, particularly those which encourage alternative modes of travel
- Planning and evaluation of advanced public transit systems
- Transportation pricing and regulation
- Energy and environmental issues, particularly demand for alternative fuels
- Effect of land-use on transportation demand
- Growth of automobile use in the U.S. and Western Europe

The transportation research program at Irvine is also supported by computerized access to the ITS Transportation Library at UC Berkeley. In addition to the resources available from the ITS Berkeley Library, ITS at UCI subscribes to the major transportation research journals and offers a variety of computer-based information retrieval services. ITS is linked to the broader professional community through a series of research colloquia and specialty conferences. The latter programs attract an international audience.

The institute also houses the UC Irvine Transportation Science graduate program.

The institute maintains a regular publication series which documents research conducted within its programs. The institute maintains the Frank Haight Memorial Library located in the Anteater Instructional Research Building on campus, named after Emeritus Professor Frank Haight, who founded the transportation research journals Transportation Research Part A and B, and Accident Analysis and Prevention.

Research on advanced transportation technologies, a focus at Irvine, is supported by a wide range of programs. These include:

- Advanced Testbed Research Program, a state and federally supported effort headquartered at UCI. This program is developing and evaluating new technologies for traffic system monitoring and control.
- Program for Improved Vehicle Demand Forecasting Models. Sponsored by the California Energy Commission, this program is investigating the state's potential market for clean fuel vehicles.
- Partnership for Advanced Transit and Highways (PATH), a state-sponsored research program on intelligent transportation systems. Headquartered at the University of California, Berkeley (UCB), with participation from UCI, this program has an annual solicitation for research ideas in Intelligent Transportation Systems.
- PATH Advanced Transportation Management Systems (ATMS) Center. Headquartered at UCI, this PATH center focuses on the research and development of ATMS technologies.
- The ITS Advanced Transportation Management System (ATMS) Laboratories at Irvine provide facilities for teaching, research, and development of high-technology applications in transportation. The laboratories include workstations tied directly to a modern traffic management center and to the local California Department of Transportation (Caltrans) district's freeway traffic management center. The laboratories also contain a network of Unix-based workstations and personal computers, and a variety of software in transportation engineering and control.
- A statewide video teleconferencing facility, video camera, recorders, monitors and accessories enable research in advanced traffic detection, monitoring and analysis. Additional features of the ATMS Laboratories include advanced traffic signal controllers and a variety of traffic data collection devices. These laboratories form the backbone of California's research initiative in ATMS and, together with the California ATMS Testbed established in Orange County as part of that initiative, provide unparalleled opportunity for the development and testing of applications of advanced technology in the management of transportation systems.

== Timeline of Significant Research ==
The significance of research from an institution can be quantified using the h-index. The h-index value from Web of Science for UCI in transportation related journals as of July 2011 was 31, which means 31 publications had at least 31 citations or more. UCI ITS ranks 7th globally in transportation research, and 5th nationally, as of 2011. A select number of those publications are listed here in a timeline format.

1979 – Charles Lave developed the first disaggregate automobile choice model, using multinomial logit

1985 – Gordon Fielding, Timlynn Babistky, and Mary Brenner identified a set of performance measures to assess bus transit performance

1986 – Will Recker and Michael McNally proposed the theoretical background for the first operational activity-based model, STARCHILD

1986 – Will Recker and Michael McNally presented part II of their STARCHILD model

1987 – Thomas Golob, Will Recker, and John Leonard studied truck-related accidents using log-linear models and found that durations of accidents were log-normally distributed

1992 – Kenneth Small proposed a revenue distribution model to make congestion pricing practical and politically viable

1992 – Genevieve Giuliano reviewed congestion pricing policies and suggested politically acceptable alternatives

1994 – Charles Lave and Patrick Elias examined the 65 mph speed limit systematically at the statewide level and showed that the change from 55 mph reduced fatality rates

1995 – Kelvin Cheu and Stephen Ritchie developed an incident detection algorithm based on inductive loop data and an artificial neural network method

1995 – Kenneth Small measured the costs of air pollution in Los Angeles from motor vehicles

1995 – Jayakrishnan, Wei Tsai, and Anthony Chen developed a dynamic traffic assignment model with network loading that made use of DYNASMART, the first mesoscopic traffic simulation model

1996 – Michael Zhang, Stephen Ritchie, and Will Recker formulated the ramp metering control as a dynamic optimal control problem and presented solution methods and validation

1997 – Thomas Golob and Michael McNally used a structural model to explain interactions between household members

1998 – Randall Crane empirically tested the hypothesis that urban design can influence travel, showing that no such evidence could be found from local household travel survey and GIS data

1999 – Carlos Sun, Stephen Ritchie, Kevin Tsai, and Jayakrishnan formulated the vehicle reidentification problem as a lexicographic optimization problem and demonstrated robust performance

2000 – David Brownstone explored the advantages of merging stated preference and revealed preference data in an empirical study to evaluate alternative fuel vehicle market penetration

2000 – Thomas Golob developed a model that jointly generates activity participation, travel time, and trip generation

2000 - Anthony Chen formulated the traffic equilibrium problem as an unconstrained optimization problem that is equivalent to the nonlinear complementarity problem.

2001 – Kenneth Small measured values of time and reliability from 1998 data where commuters chose between a free and a variably tolled route

2001 – Marlon Boarnet further showed that the influence of land use on travel behavior is high sensitive to the choice of behavioral and statistical assumptions

2001 – Thomas Golob and Amelia Regan explored ways of applying information technology to personal travel and freight research

2003 – Thomas Golob conducted a review of the literature on structural equation modelling for travel behavior research

2004 - Kenneth Small argued that second-best toll pricing requires explicit consideration of user heterogeneity.

2005 – By merging RP and SP data, David Brownstone and Kenneth Small showed that value of time under revealed conditions are more than two times higher than from stated preferences, suggesting a perception bias in value of time
