= Regional Science Policy and Practice =

Regional Science Policy & Practice (RSPP)
- Discipline: Regional science
- Language: English
- Edited by: Tomaz Ponce Dentinho

Publication details
- History: 2008-present
- Publisher: Wiley-Blackwell on behalf of the Regional Science Association International.
- Frequency: 6 issues per year

Standard abbreviations
- ISO 4: Reg. Sci. Policy Pract.

Indexing
- ISSN: 1757-7802
- LCCN: 2010242263
- OCLC no.: 710020262

Links
- Journal homepage; Online access; Online archive

Regional Science Policy & Practice (RSPP), since 2019 publish six issues per year, is a peer-reviewed academic journal published by Wiley-Blackwell on behalf of the Regional Science Association International. It was established in 2008 and covers regional science topics from disciplines such as planning, economics, environmental science, geography, and public policy.
