= RSAI =

RSAI may refer to:

- Regional Science Association International
- Royal Society of Antiquaries of Ireland
