= Marlon Boarnet =

American urban planning scholar

Marlon G. Boarnet
- Occupation: Professor

Academic background
- Education: Rice University (BA); Princeton University (PhD)

Academic work
- Discipline: Urban planning, transportation planning, urban economics, regional science
- Institutions: University of Southern California; University of California, Irvine

Marlon Gary Boarnet (born 1961) is an American academic and urban planning scholar. He is a professor at the University of Southern California's Sol Price School of Public Policy and director of the METRANS Transportation Consortium. His research focuses on land use and transportation, travel behavior, urban growth patterns, regional science, urban economics, public health, greenhouse gas emissions, and the economic effects of transportation infrastructure.

== Education ==
Boarnet received a Bachelor of Arts in physics from Rice University and a Ph.D. in public affairs from Princeton University.

== Career ==
Boarnet was a professor of planning, policy, and design and of economics at the University of California, Irvine from 1991 to 2011, where he was also a faculty associate of the Institute of Transportation Studies at UC Irvine. He later joined the University of Southern California, where he became a professor at the Sol Price School of Public Policy's Department of Urban Planning and Spatial Analysis. He is also director of the METRANS Transportation Consortium and associate director of the National Center for Sustainable Transportation.

== Research ==
Boarnet's research examines the relationship between urban form, transportation systems, and travel behavior. His work has addressed land use and travel, vehicle miles traveled, greenhouse gas emissions, public health, urban growth, transit, walking, and transportation infrastructure.

He is co-author, with Randall Crane, of Travel by Design: The Influence of Urban Form on Travel, published by Oxford University Press in 2001. The book examines whether neighborhood design and urban form can influence transportation behavior.

Boarnet served on the National Research Council committee that authored Driving and the Built Environment: The Effects of Compact Development on Motorized Travel, Energy Use, and CO2 Emissions, a 2009 report published by the Transportation Research Board. His article "Spillovers and the Locational Effects of Public Infrastructure" was published in the Journal of Regional Science in 1998. He was lead author of "California's Safe Routes to School Program: Impacts on Walking, Bicycling, and Pedestrian Safety", published in the Journal of the American Planning Association in 2005.

Boarnet has also studied rail transit and travel behavior. He co-authored the 2020 article "Do high income households reduce driving more when living near rail transit?" with Raphael Bostic, who was then president of the Federal Reserve Bank of Atlanta. With Xize Wang and Douglas Houston, he published "Can New Light Rail Reduce Personal Vehicle Carbon Emissions? A Before-After, Experimental-Control Evaluation in Los Angeles" in the Journal of Regional Science. He co-authored related work on driving reduction after the introduction of the Los Angeles Expo Line.

== Professional service and honors ==
Boarnet was elected president of the Association of Collegiate Schools of Planning for 2019-2021. He was named a fellow of the Regional Science Association International in 2017. He is also a fellow of the Weimer School of the Homer Hoyt Institute.

Boarnet co-edited the Journal of Regional Science for twelve years, including eight years as managing co-editor. He has also served as associate editor of the Journal of the American Planning Association and on the editorial boards of Journal of Planning Literature, Journal of Transport and Land Use, Papers in Regional Science, and Transport Policy.

== Selected publications ==
- Boarnet, M. G., & Crane, R. (2001). Travel by Design: The Influence of Urban Form on Travel. Oxford University Press.
- Boarnet, M. G. (1998). Spillovers and the locational effects of public infrastructure. Journal of Regional Science, 38(3), 381–400. https://doi.org/10.1111/0022-4146.00099
- Boarnet, M. G., Day, K., Anderson, C., McMillan, T., & Alfonzo, M. (2005). California's Safe Routes to School Program: Impacts on walking, bicycling, and pedestrian safety. Journal of the American Planning Association, 71(3), 301–317. https://doi.org/10.1080/01944360508976700
- Boarnet, M. G. (2010). Planning, climate change, and transportation: Thoughts on policy analysis. Transportation Research Part A: Policy and Practice, 44(8), 587–595. https://doi.org/10.1016/j.tra.2010.03.001
- Boarnet, M. G., Wang, X., & Houston, D. (2017). Can new light rail reduce personal vehicle carbon emissions? A before-after, experimental-control evaluation in Los Angeles. Journal of Regional Science, 57(3), 523–539. https://doi.org/10.1111/jors.12275
- Spears, S., Boarnet, M. G., & Houston, D. (2017). Driving reduction after the introduction of light rail transit: Evidence from an experimental-control group evaluation of the Los Angeles Expo Line. Urban Studies, 54(12), 2780–2799. https://doi.org/10.1177/0042098016657261
- Boarnet, M. G., Bostic, R. W., Rodnyansky, S., Burinskiy, E., Eisenlohr, A., Jamme, H.-T., & Santiago-Bartolomei, R. (2020). Do high income households reduce driving more when living near rail transit? Transportation Research Part D: Transport and Environment, 80, 102244. https://doi.org/10.1016/j.trd.2020.102244

== See also ==
- USC Price School of Public Policy
- University of Southern California
