= International Regional Science Review =

- Discipline: Regional science
- Language: English
- Edited by: Alan T. Murray and Tony H. Grubesic

Publication details
- History: 1975-present
- Publisher: SAGE Publications
- Frequency: Quarterly
- Impact factor: 1.75 (2017)

Standard abbreviations
- ISO 4: Int. Reg. Sci. Rev.

Indexing
- ISSN: 0160-0176 (print); 1552-6925 (web)
- LCCN: 78643713
- OCLC no.: 1701088

Links
- Journal homepage; Online access; Online archive

The International Regional Science Review is a peer-reviewed academic journal that covers the field of regional science. The journal's editors-in-chiefs are Alan T. Murray (University of California, Santa Barbara) and Tony H. Grubesic (University of California, Riverside). It was established in 1975 and is currently published by SAGE Publications.

== Abstracting and indexing ==
International Regional Science Review is abstracted and indexed in Scopus and the Social Sciences Citation Index. According to the Journal Citation Reports, its 2017 impact factor is 1.75, ranking it 19 out of 40 journals in the category "Urban Studies", 28 out of 57 journals in the category "Planning & Development", and 65 out of 108 journals in the category "Environmental Studies".

== See also ==
- Annals of Regional Science
- Journal of Regional Science
- Papers in Regional Science
- List of planning journals
