= Alan T. Murray =

Geographer and regional scientist

- Awards: Walter Isard Award (2015); Fellow of the American Association for the Advancement of Science (2019)

Academic background
- Education: University of California, Santa Barbara

Academic work
- Discipline: Geography, regional science
- Institutions: University of California, Santa Barbara

Alan T. Murray is a geographer and regional scientist. He is a distinguished professor and the Yardi Chair in Geography at the University of California, Santa Barbara (UCSB). His research focuses on geographic information science, spatial optimization, and their applications in planning, emergency response, and infrastructure. He is also a co-editor of the journal International Regional Science Review.

== Education and career ==
Murray earned a B.S. in mathematics in 1990, a M.A. in statistics and applied probability in 1992, and a Ph.D. in geography in 1995, all from UCSB. After research and teaching appointments at Queensland University of Technology and the University of Queensland, he joined Ohio State University in 1999. He became a professor there in 2005 and directed its Center for Urban and Regional Analysis from 2005 to 2008.

Murray was a professor at Arizona State University from 2008 to 2014 and at Drexel University from 2014 to 2015. He returned to UCSB as a professor in 2015.

== Research ==
Murray's research combines geographic information science and spatial optimization with location modeling, particularly the planning and allocation of facilities and services. His work in location analysis has addressed regional service coverage, the siting of urban fire stations, and the performance of commercial geographic information system location tools.

== Professional service and honors ==
Murray was the 58th president of the Western Regional Science Association and delivered the association's 2017 presidential address, "Analytics in Regional Science". He received the Walter Isard Award for Scholarly Achievement from the North American Regional Science Council in 2015.

Murray was elected a Fellow of the Regional Science Association International in 2018. He was elected a Fellow of the American Association for the Advancement of Science in 2019 for his contributions to location modeling, spatial optimization, and decision support. That year, Murray and Richard L. Church received the William Alonso Memorial Prize for Innovative Work in Regional Science for their book Location Covering Models.

== Selected works ==
- Murray, Alan T.; Grubesic, Tony H., eds. (2007). Critical Infrastructure: Reliability and Vulnerability. Springer. doi:10.1007/978-3-540-68056-7. ISBN 9783540680550.
- Church, Richard L.; Murray, Alan T. (2009). Business Site Selection, Location Analysis and GIS. John Wiley & Sons. doi:10.1002/9780470432761. ISBN 9780470191064.
- Church, Richard L.; Murray, Alan T. (2018). Location Covering Models: History, Applications and Advancements. Advances in Spatial Science. Springer. doi:10.1007/978-3-319-99846-6. ISBN 9783319998459.
