= David M. Levinson =

American urban planner (born 1967)

David Matthew Levinson
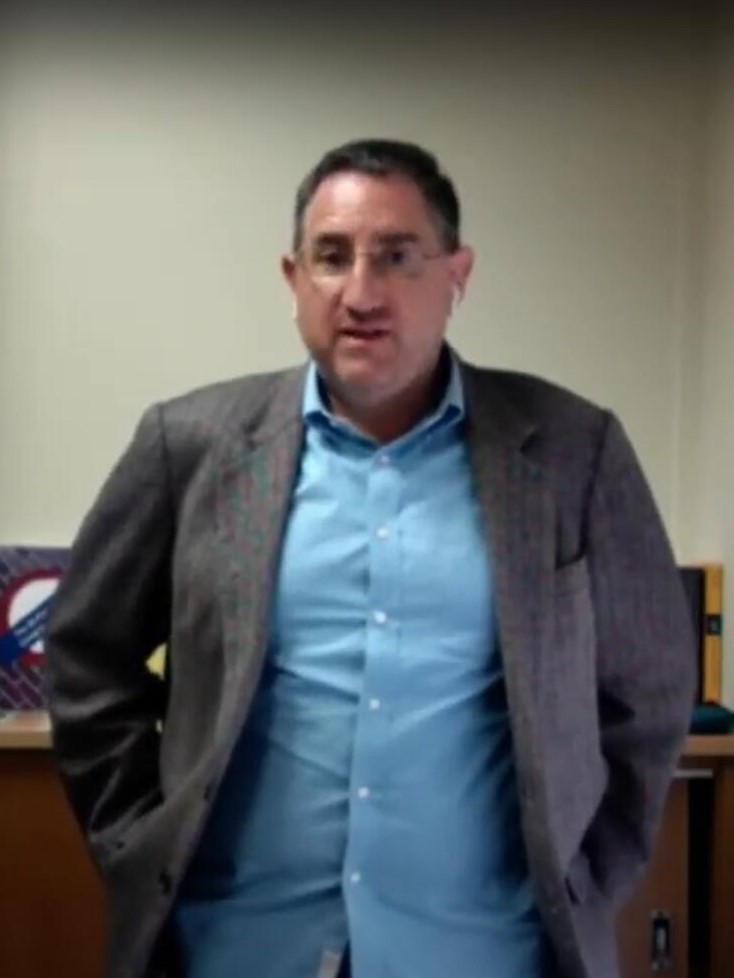
- Born: 1967 (age 58–59); Baltimore, Maryland, U.S.
- Education: Georgia Institute of Technology (BS); University of Maryland (BS); University of California, Berkeley (PhD)
- Scientific career
- Fields: Transportation planning, travel behavior
- Workplaces: University of Sydney; University of Minnesota

David Matthew Levinson (born 1967) is an American civil engineer and transportation analyst, a professor at the University of Sydney since 2017. He formerly held the RP Braun/CTS Chair in Transportation at the University of Minnesota.

== Education ==
Levinson earned a BS in civil engineering from Georgia Institute of Technology in 1988, an MS in civil and environmental engineering from the University of Maryland, College Park in 1992, and a PhD in civil and environmental engineering from the University of California, Berkeley in 1998, with a dissertation titled "On Whom the Toll Falls: A Model of Network Financing".

== Career ==
Levinson worked for Montgomery County, Maryland as a transportation planner from 1989 to 1994 and was a research engineer at the University of California, Berkeley in 1998–1999. In 1999, he became a faculty member at the University of Minnesota, where he directed the research group on Networks, Economics, and Urban Systems, was managing director of the Accessibility Observatory, and from 2006 to 2016 held the Richard P. Braun/CTS Chair in Transportation. He was also a graduate faculty member in the applied economics and urban and regional planning programs. He was a visiting scholar at Imperial College London in 2006–2007. In 2017 he moved to the University of Sydney, while remaining an adjunct faculty member at the University of Minnesota. At the University of Sydney, Levinson is foundation Professor of Transport in the School of Civil Engineering and heads the TransportLab. He is the director of the Metropolitan Travel Survey Archive in the United States, a founder of the World Society for Transport and Land Use Research, and founding editor of the Journal of Transport and Land Use and of Findings. He has also served as board chair at Streets.mn, a community blog dedicated to transport and land use issues in Minnesota, and WalkSydney, a pedestrian advocacy organisation in Australia where as of 2026 he is an advisor.

Levinson researched the evolution of transportation networks on a grant from the National Science Foundation and has developed models of the co-evolution of transport and land use systems, demonstrating mutual causality empirically. At both the University of Minnesota and the University of Sydney, he has researched jobs access in metropolitan areas and decision making between modes of public transit.

In 1995 he was awarded the Charles Tiebout Prize in Regional Science by the Western Regional Science Association, and in 2004, the CUTC-ARTBA New Faculty Award.

He has a personal blog, Transportationist.

== Publications ==
Levinson has authored or co-authored books, edited collected volumes, and authored or co-authored over 200 peer-reviewed articles on various aspects of transportation. His most widely cited works are on transportation accessibility and on the travel time budget.

=== Books ===
- Financing Transportation Networks, Edward Elgar Publishers, ISBN 1-8406-4594-6, 2002
- The Transportation Experience: Policy, Planning, and Deployment (with William Garrison), Oxford University Press, ISBN 0-19-517250-7, 2005
- Planning for Place and Plexus (with Kevin J. Krizek), Routledge, ISBN 978-0415774918, 2008, 2nd ed. 2018 as Metropolitan Transport and Land Use, ISBN 978-1138924260
- Evolving Transportation Networks (with Feng Xie), Springer ISBN 978-1441998033, 2011
- The End of Traffic and the Future of Access: A Roadmap to the New Transport Economy (with Kevin Krizek), Network Design Lab, ISBN 978-1981864973, 3rd ed. 2017
- Spontaneous Access: Reflexions on Designing Cities and Transport, Network Design Lab, ISBN 978-1981865369, 2017
- Elements of Access: Transport Planning for Engineers Transport Engineering for Planners (with Wes Marshall, Kay Axhausen), Network Design Lab, ISBN 978-1981865185, 2017
- Political Economy of Access: Infrastructure, Networks, Cities, and Institutions (with David King), Network Design Lab, ISBN 978-0368351594, 2019
- The 30-Minute City: Designing for Access, Network Design Lab, ISBN 978-1650232096, 2019
