= Western Regional Science Association =

Regional science scholarly association

- Abbreviation: WRSA
- Formation: 1961
- Type: Professional association
- Purpose: Promoting research in regional science
- Region served: Western United States and international
- President: Alessandra Faggian
- President-Elect: Marlon Boarnet
- Executive Director: Jaewon Lim
- Affiliations: Regional Science Association International, North American Regional Science Council, Pacific Regional Science Conference Organization
- Website: www.wrsaonline.org

The Western Regional Science Association (WRSA) is a multidisciplinary scholarly association in regional science. Founded in 1961, it brings together academic scholars and government and private-sector practitioners concerned with the scientific analysis of regions. WRSA awards the annual Charles M. Tiebout Prize for graduate student research. Springer publishes the Annals of Regional Science on behalf of the WRSA, as the association's official academic journal.

== History and activities ==
WRSA was established in 1961, during the early expansion of regional science as an organized interdisciplinary field. Regional science emerged in the 1950s through work by scholars including Walter Isard, who sought to connect economists, geographers, planners, political scientists, and other researchers interested in spatial and regional analysis.

WRSA hosts an annual meeting in which full papers are discussed in seminar format sessions. These sessions cover topics such as regional modeling, location of economic activity, regional and urban planning, environmental quality, regional development, migration, transportation, public-service location, housing, tourism, recreation, and energy issues.

== Affiliations ==
WRSA is a founding member of both the Pacific Regional Science Conference Organization (PRSCO) and the North American Regional Science Council (NARSC). WRSA represents the Western USA section of the Regional Science Association International (RSAI), the global umbrella organization for regional science associations. WRSA has periodically hosted larger regional science meetings, including Pacific and North American meetings organized through PRSCO and NARSC.

== Publications ==
On behalf of WRSA, Springer publishes the Annals of Regional Science, a peer-reviewed scholarly journal in regional and urban studies. It is the official journal of WRSA and publishes research across regional and spatial economics, human geography, microeconomics, environmental economics, and geography.

== Tiebout Prize ==
WRSA awards the annual Charles M. Tiebout Prize in Regional Science, named for economist Charles Tiebout, a past President of WRSA. The prize recognizes the best graduate student paper in regional science. Previous award winners include prominent regional science and urban scholars such as David M. Levinson and Kara Kockelman.

== Leadership ==
As of 2026, Alessandra Faggian of the Gran Sasso Science Institute serves as president of WRSA. Marlon Boarnet of the University of Southern California serves as WRSA's president-elect and Jaewon Lim of the University of Nevada, Las Vegas serves as its executive director.

Past presidents of WRSA include Charles Tiebout, Arthur Getis, Genevieve Giuliano, Alan T. Murray, and Geoffrey J. D. Hewings.

== See also ==
- Annals of Regional Science
- Regional science
- Regional Science Association International
