= Yoram Shiftan =

Israeli transportation researcher

- יורם שיפטן
- Born: 1958 (age 67–68)
- Education: Technion, MIT
- Scientific career
- Fields: travel behavior, transportation system
- Workplaces: Technion
- Thesis: Transportation Workforce Planning in the Transit Industry: Incorporating Absence, Overtime, and Reliability Relationships (1991)
- Doctoral advisor: Nigel Wilson

Yoram Shiftan (Hebrew: יורם שיפטן; born 1958) is a professor in the Faculty of Civil and Environmental Engineering at the Technion – Israel Institute of Technology, where he holds the Joseph Meyerhoff Chair in Urban and Regional Planning.

Shiftan's research focuses on travel behavior and transportation system analysis. He is the head of the Israeli Smart Transportation Research Center and a consultant to major strategic transportation projects in Israel and abroad.

== Early life and education ==
Yoram Shiftan was born in Jerusalem, Israel, and studied at Leyada, the Hebrew University high school. He studied civil engineering at the Technion and earned a BSc (cum laude) in 1986. He continued his studies at the Technion and received his MSc in civil engineering in 1988. He earned his PhD in 1991 from the Massachusetts Institute of Technology (MIT), with the thesis "Transportation Workforce Planning in the Transit Industry: Incorporating Absence, Overtime, and Reliability Relationships” under the supervision of Prof. Nigel Wilson.

== Academic career ==
In 1991 Shiftan started working at Cambridge Systematics Inc, a transportation consultancy firm in the US, and became a senior associate. He then joined Technion's civil engineering faculty in 1996 as a lecturer. He became a senior lecturer in 1999. Shiftan was promoted to associate professor in 2005 and to full professor in 2016. From 2019 he holds the Joseph Meyerhoff Chair in Urban and Regional Planning in the faculty.

During his career, Shiftan was a visiting professor at the departments of Civil and Environmental Engineering of Northwestern University, Evanston, IL.; the University of IL Chicago; Ohio State University; the Institute for Transport Planning and Systems (IVT), ETH, Zurich; Taubman College of Architecture and Urban Planning, University of Michigan; and School of Public Policy, George Mason University, Arlington, VA. and taught courses on demand modeling and transport project evaluation. Shiftan has supervised 20 PhD and 50 MSc students.

== Research ==
Shiftan's research focuses on travel behavior and demand and their implications for policy and investment decision-making. He develops models to predict, plan and analyze the demand for travel, using theories in economics, psychology, and engineering. The models analyze transportation systems to improve efficiency and equity and examine their economic, environmental, social, and safety impacts.

He developed the Activity-Based Models (ABM). Instead of just forecasting the trips people will undertake, it estimates the activities they will perform, and derives from that the trips they'll take to execute them. These models significantly increase the understanding of travel behavior and provide better tools for transportation planning. Shiftan developed the methods for implementing these models and designed the Tel Aviv AMB.

In recent years his research has focused on the activity and travel behavior implication of smart transportation and driverless cars and their potential impact on cities.

== Professional activities ==
Professor Shiftan has been the head of the Israeli Smart Transportation Research Center since 2019. He was president of the Israel Association for Transportation Research from 2004 to 2007.

Shiftan was also the editor of Transport Policy during 2010–2017 and the chair of the International Association of Travel Behavior Research (IATBR) from 2014 to 2015. He is also a member of the editorial board of a dozen scientific journals in the field of transportation.

Shiftan has been a consultant on major transportation projects in the US and Israel on travel demand, transport policy, and environmental impact. Among others, he developed the travel demand models for the Los Angeles and San Francisco Bay Area as well as the Second Avenue Subway in New York City. In Israel, he was the academic advisor for the Israeli guide for Transport Project Evaluation and advised on the demand models, planning, and cost benefits of major investments. These include the Tel-Aviv Metro System, the Israel Railways Strategic Plan, and the Jerusalem Light Rail. His clients include the Israel Ministry of Transport and the Israel Ministry of Finance, the United States Department of Transportation, the Federal Highway Administration, and several states and major metropolitan areas in the US.

== Publications ==
Shiftan has authored some 150 articles and edited five books.

=== Books ===
- Shiftan Y., K. Button and P. Nijkamp (Eds.), Transportation Planning, as part of the Button K. and Nijkamp P. (Ed.) "Classics in Planning" series, 642 pages, Edward Elgar Publishing Ltd., 2007
- Geerlings, H., Shiftan, Y., and Stead, D., (Eds.) Transition towards Sustainable Mobility: the Role of Instruments, Individuals and Institutions, 406 pages, Ashgate, Surrey, England, 2012
- Attard, M., and Shiftan, Y., (Eds.), Sustainable Urban Transport, Volume 7 of the Transport and Sustainability series, Emerald Group Publishing Limited, 2015
- Hakim, S., Albert, G., and Shiftan, Y., (Eds.), Securing Transportation Systems, John Wiley & Sons Inc., NJ, 2015
- Shiftan, Y. and Kamargianni, M., (Eds.) Preparing for the New Era of Transportation Policies: Learning from Experience. The first book of the Van Wee (Ed.) “Advances in Transport Policy and Planning” series, Elsevier, Academic Press, 2018

=== Selected articles ===
- Kogus, A., Brůhová Foltýnová, H., Gal-Tzur, A., Shiftan, Y., Vejchodská, E., Shiftan, Y., Will COVID-19 accelerate telecommuting? A cross-country evaluation for Israel and Czechia, Transportation Research A: Policy and Practice Vol. 164, pp. 291–309, 2022
- Cohen-Blankshtain, G., Bar-Gera, H., Shiftan, Y., "Congestion pricing and positive incentives: conceptual analysis and empirical findings from Israel” Transportation, on-line 2022
- Tenenboim E., Munichor, N., Shiftan, Y., “Justifying toll payment with biased travel time estimates: Behavioral findings and route choice modeling, Transportation, 2022
- Etzioni, S., Daziano, R., Ben-Elia, E, & Shiftan, Y., “Preferences for Shared Automated Vehicles: A Hybrid Latent Class Modeling Approach” Transportation Research C, 125, 2021
- Harb, M., Stathopoulos, A., Shiftan, Y., & Walker, J., “What Do We (Not) Know About Our Future with Automated Vehicles”, Transportation Research C, 123, 2021
- Etzioni, S., Hamadneh, J., Elvarsson, A.B., Esztergár-Kiss, D., Djukanovic, M., Neophytou, S.N., Sodnik, J., Polydoropoulou, A., Tsouros, I., Pronello, C., Thomopoulos, N., and Shiftan, Y., “Modeling Cross-National Differences in Automated Vehicle Acceptance” Sustainability, 12(22), 2020
- DiCiommo, F., and Shiftan, Y., Transport Equity Analysis, Transport Reviews, Vol. 37, No. 2, pp 139–151, 2017
- Haboucha, C. J., Ishaq, R., Shiftan, Y., “User preferences regarding autonomous vehicles, Transportation Research C No. 78, pp. 37–49, 2017
- Ben-Elia, E2., Di Pace, R., Bifulco, G.N., and Shiftan, Y., “The impact of travel information’s accuracy on route-choice.” Transportation Research C, Vol. 26, pp. 146–159, 2013
- Sharaby, N.3, and Shiftan, Y., “The impact of fare integration on travel behavior and transit ridership.” Transport Policy, Vol. 21, pp. 63–70, 2012
- Shiftan, Y., and Ben-Akiva, M., “A practical policy-sensitive, activity-based, travel-demand model.” The Annals of Regional Science, Vol. 47, No. 3, pp. 517–541, 2011
- Ben Elia, E.1, and Shiftan Y., “Which road do I take? A learning-based model of route-choice behavior with real-time information.” Transportation Research Part A: Policy and Practice, Vol. 44, No. 4, pp. 249–264, 2010
- Shiftan Y., Outwater, M.L3., and Zhou, Y.3, "Transit market research using structural equation modeling and attitudinal market segmentation.” Transport Policy, Vol. 15, No. 3, pp. 186–195, 2008
- Shiftan Y., Kaplan S1., and Hakkert S., “Scenario building as a tool for planning a sustainable transportation system.” Transportation Research D: Transport and Environment, No 8, pp. 323–342, 2003

== Personal life ==
Shiftan is married to Alona Nitzan-Shiftan. They have two children and live in Haifa.
