= Location theory =

Concept in economic geography

Location theory has become an integral part of economic geography, regional science, and spatial economics. Location theory addresses questions of what economic activities are located where and why. Location theory or microeconomic theory generally assumes that agents act in their own self-interest. Firms thus choose locations that maximize their profits and individuals choose locations that maximize their utility.

Location theory deals with questions concerning what economic activities are located where and why and looks at the spatial organization of production, exchange and consumption. In its microeconomic formulation, location theory supposes that agents act in their own self-interest: the firm chooses locations which maximize profits, while the individual chooses locations which maximize utility.The theory examines the influences of transport costs, land rents, economies of scale, market access, agglomeration economies and market structure on these locational decisions. By modelling the trade-offs between distance, costs and benefits, location theory is useful for explaining patterns of spatial concentration and dispersion, such as the emergence of cities, industrial clusters and regional specialisation. Modern spatial economic models focus on interaction between increasing returns and trade costs in the formation of core-periphery structures and regional differences.

The foundations of location theory were established in the nineteenth and early twentieth century using classical models such as the agricultural land use theory of Johann Heinrich von Thunen, the industrial location theory of Alfred Weber, and the central place theory of Walter Christaller.These early contributions set up the frameworks for analysing the structure of distance and market areas and economic activity. The field was revived in the "new economic geography" in the late twentieth century, most notably the work of Paul Krugman, who incorporated increasing returns and imperfect competition into formal models of spatial concentration.

Today, location theory is still at the heart of the analysis of urban systems, industrial clustering, regional inequality, global supply chains and economic development. It gives a theoretical foundation for economic geography by explaining decision-making processes that create spatial patterns of production and trade that can be observed in space.

== History ==
=== Transportation costs ===
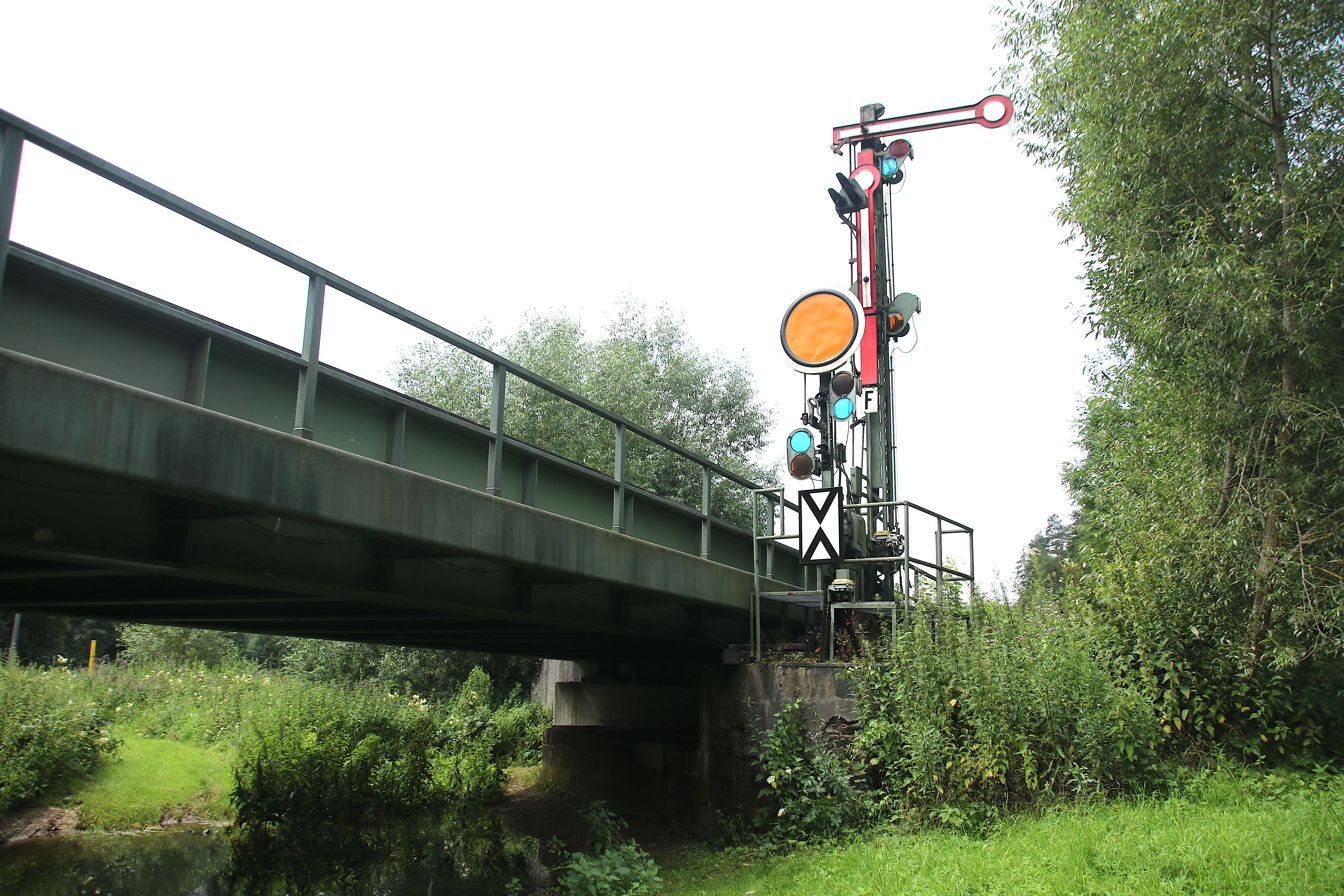
Railway in Germany.

While others should get some credit for earlier work (e.g., Richard Cantillon, Etienne Bonnot de Condillac, David Hume, Sir James D. Steuart, and David Ricardo), it was not until the publication of Johann Heinrich von Thünen's first volume of Der Isolierte Staat in 1826 that location theory can be said to have really gotten underway. Indeed, the prominent regional scientist Walter Isard has called von Thünen "the father of location theorists." In Der Isolierte Staat, von Thünen notes that the costs of transporting goods consumes some of Ricardo's economic rent. He notes that because these transportation costs and, of course, economic rents, vary across goods, different land uses and use intensities will result with increased distance from the marketplace. However, the discussion was criticized since Johann Heinrich von Thünen oversimplified the problem with his assumptions of, for example, isolated states or single cities.

A German hegemony of sorts seems to have taken hold in location theory from the time of von Thünen through to Walter Christaller's 1933 book Die Zentralen Orte in Sűddeutschland, which formulated much of what is now understood as central place theory. An especially notable contribution was made by Alfred Weber, who published Über den Standort der Industrien in 1909. Working from a model akin to a physical frame adapted from some ideas by Pierre Varignon (a Varignon frame), Weber applies freight rates of resources and finished goods, along with the finished good's production function, to develop an algorithm that identifies the optimal location for manufacturing plant. He also introduces distortions induced by labor and both agglomerative and deglomerative forces. Weber then discusses groupings of production units, anticipating August Lösch's market areas.

Carl Wilhelm Friedrich Launhardt conceived much of that for which Alfred Weber received credit, prior to Weber's work. Moreover, his contributions are surprisingly more modern in their analytical content than are Weber's. This suggests that Launhardt was ahead of his time and not readily understood by many of his contemporaries, for instance he showed that railways cannot be fully developed by private capital alone.

Proof
The cost per transport-unit k is:

$k=f+\frac{Ai}{C}$

Where f is the direct cost of working, i the interest on capital A and C the annual volume traffic. Since f=F(A):

$k=F(A)+\frac{Ai}{C}$

and the minimum is found by imposing the first derivative equal to zero:

$F'(A)+\frac{Ai}{C}=0$

The capitalist would maximize dividend d not cost per transport-unit k:

$d=\frac{C[e-(f+\frac{Ai}{C})]}{A}$

Where e is the freight. Substituting f=F(A) and imposing the first derivative equal to zero:

$AF'(A)+[e-F(A)]=0$

Therefore the amount of private capital invested depends on freight.

Whether Weber was familiar with Launhardt's publications remains unclear. Weber was most certainly influenced by others, most notably Wilhelm Roscher and Albert Schäffle, who seem likely to have read Launhardt's work. Regardless, location theoretical thought blossomed only after Weber's book was published.

The Swedish economist Tord Palander completed a 1935 PhD, Contributions to Location Theory, which considered the market area division of two competing firms. The American economist William Henry Dean, Jr. completed his Harvard PhD in 1938, The theory of the geographic location of economic activities.

=== Site selection ===
Literature on site selection theory used to look until recent years at the various issues only from a national point of view. By large, there are no international reviews to be found in these publications. In the US, a country in which industrial site selection played a role very early on, resulting in a very early search for methodical approaches, Edgar M. Hoover was one of the leading pioneers in the field of site analysis. In his book “The Location of Economic Activity”, Hoover compiled crucial criteria of industrial site selection as early as 1948 that still apply today. There were, however, some quite early attempts to combine theories of international trade with nationally oriented site theories in order to develop a site theory with an international perspective. One of these early authors was Ohlin (1952), followed by Sabathil (1969), Moore (1978), Tesch (1980), and Goette (1994) .

Nevertheless, even to this day, this situation has only changed to some extent. Even though since the 1990s it has no longer been only major corporations that expand abroad, and any foreign direct investment results in a site selection, there are still very few well-researched studies on this topic. A specifically international site selection theory is still not discernible. Many current and more recent publications either review site decisions made by individual corporations or analyze them as reference cases. Other publications focus on a cost-specific approach largely driven by site relocations in the context of cost structure optimization within major corporations. However, these publications only rarely and at best cursorily deal with issues of construction and real estate aspects.

Theodor Sabathil's 1969 dissertation is considered one of the early in-depth studies in the area of international site selection. Therein, Sabathil largely focused on country selection, which is part of the site selection process. In this context, Sabathil compiled a comprehensive catalogue of site factors and a theoretical approach to site selection; the latter does not go into great detail. Neither does Sabathil take any legal, natural, or cultural site factors into consideration. However, he discusses in particular company-specific framework conditions and psychological factors.

The dissertation submitted in 1980 by Peter Tesch constitutes another milestone in the further development of international site theory. Tesch combines theories of international trade and investment with site theories. He is the first to include country-specific framework conditions in his analysis. The main basis for his comments on the various types of internationalization are location-specific competitive advantages. In this context, Tesch developed a catalogue of criteria for international site decisions grouped into three categories: • site factors affecting all company activities • availability and costs of the site factors impacting on the production factors • turnover-related site factors.

Thomas Goette's 1994 study tries to classify important international site factors and to structure the process of international site selection. Goette distinguishes between economic site conditions (sales potential, competitive conditions, infrastructure and transportation costs, labor, monetary conditions), political site conditions (tax legislation, environmental protection, institutional market entry barriers, support of business, political risks), cultural site conditions (differences in language, mentality, religion, and the lack of acceptancy of foreign companies), and geographical site conditions (climate, topography). This study again demonstrates that an attempt to cover all aspects will result in loss of quality as all factors were not or could not be taken into consideration. Goette also theorizes that, in particular, industrial site decisions within companies are usually once-off and division-related decision-making processes. Based on this, Goette assumes a relatively low learning curve, and hence little potential for improvement for subsequent projects.

As one of the last major contributions, Thomas Glatte aimed to enhance and globalize the known systems in his book "International Production Site Selection" by providing a 10-staged selection process, suggesting selected methods for each selection stage and offering a comprehensive list of criteria for the practitioner.

== Other uses ==
Location theory has also been used outside of economics, for example in conservation biology, where it can help to find areas that would be good to study, taking into account previous studies.

== See also ==
- Industrial inertia
- Location model
- Regional economics
- Spatial planning
- Weber problem
