= Palander =

Palander is a surname. Notable people with the surname include:

- Kalle Palander (born 1977), Finnish alpine skier
- Louis Palander (1842–1920), Swedish naval officer
- Tord Palander (1902–1972), Swedish economist
