= Charles Tiebout =

American economist and geographer

Charles M. Tiebout
- Born: October 12, 1924; Norwalk, Connecticut, United States
- Died: January 16, 1968 (aged 43)
- Education: Wesleyan University; University of Michigan (PhD)
- Known for: Tiebout model
- Scientific career
- Fields: Economic geography, Regional economics, Public economics
- Workplaces: Northwestern; UCLA; University of Washington
- Doctoral advisor: Daniel Suits

Charles Mills Tiebout (1924–1968) was an economist and geographer most known for his development of the Tiebout model, which suggested that there were actually non-political solutions to the free rider problem in local governance.

Tiebout earned recognition in the area of local government and fiscal federalism with his widely cited paper “A pure theory of local expenditures”. He graduated from Wesleyan University in 1950, and received a PhD in economics in University of Michigan in 1957. He was Professor of Economics and Geography at the University of Washington and served as President of the Western Regional Science Association. He died suddenly on January 16, 1968, at age 43.

Tiebout is frequently associated with the concept of foot voting, that is, physically moving to another jurisdiction where policies are closer to one's ideologies, instead of voting to change a government or its policies. The annual Charles M. Tiebout Prize in Regional Science is awarded by the Western Regional Science Association in his honor.

== Major publications ==
- Tiebout, C. (1956). "A pure theory of local expenditures". Journal of Political Economy. 64 (5): 416–424. doi:10.1086/257839. S2CID 10281240.
- Tiebout, C. (1956). "Exports and regional economic growth". Journal of Political Economy. 64 (2): 160–164. doi:10.1086/257771. S2CID 153430854.
- Tiebout, C. (1960). "Community income multipliers: a population growth model". Journal of Regional Science. 2 (1): 75–84. doi:10.1111/j.1467-9787.1960.tb00836.x.
- Tiebout, C. (1961). "An economic theory of fiscal decentralization". NBER, public finances, needs, sources, and utilization. Princeton Univ. Press. pp. 79–96.
- Tiebout, C.; Hansen, W. L. (1963). "An intersectoral flows analysis of the California economy". The Review of Economics and Statistics. 45 (4): 409–418. Bibcode:1963RvE&S..45..409H. doi:10.2307/1927925. JSTOR 1927925.

== See also ==
- Tiebout model
- Western Regional Science Association
