= Regional Science and Urban Economics =

- Discipline: Urban economics, microeconomics
- Language: English
- Edited by: G. Ahlfeldt, L. Gobillon

Publication details
- Former name(s): Regional and Urban Economics
- History: 1971-present
- Publisher: Elsevier
- Frequency: Bimonthly
- Impact factor: 1.278 (2017)

Standard abbreviations
- ISO 4: Reg. Sci. Urban Econ.

Indexing
- CODEN: RSUEDM
- ISSN: 0166-0462

Links
- Journal homepage; Online access

Regional Science and Urban Economics is a bimonthly peer-reviewed academic journal covering urban economics and microeconomics in regards to regional phenomena. It was established in 1971 as Regional and Urban Economics, obtaining its current name in 1975. It is published by Elsevier and the editors-in-chief are Gabrield Ahlfeldt (London School of Economics and Political Science), and Laurent Gobillon (Paris School of Economics). According to Elsevier, the journal has a 2022 impact factor of 3.1.
