= William Henry Dean Jr. =

American economic geographer

William Henry Dean Jr. (1910–1952) was an American economic geographer. He was the second African American to gain a PhD in economics from Harvard University. His 1938 doctoral dissertation applied results from mathematics and astronomy to location theory in economic geography.

== Works ==
- The theory of the geographic location of economic activities, with special reference to historical change. PhD thesis, Harvard University, 1938.
