= Tiebout model =

Economic-political theory

The Tiebout model, also known as Tiebout sorting, Tiebout migration, or Tiebout hypothesis, is a positive political theory model first described by economist Charles Tiebout in his article "A Pure Theory of Local Expenditures" (1956). The essence of the model is that there is in fact a non-political solution to the free rider problem in local governance. Specifically, competition across local jurisdictions places competitive pressures on the provision of local public goods such that these local governments are able to provide the optimal level of public goods.

== Overview ==
Tiebout first proposed the model informally as a graduate student in a seminar with Richard Musgrave, who argued that the free rider problem necessarily required a political solution. Later, after obtaining his PhD, Tiebout fully described his hypothesis in a seminal article published in 1956 by the Journal of Political Economy.

Tiebout believed that the ideas of shopping and competition could be brought into the public sphere to allow for a non-political solution to optimal public goods provision. The model holds that if municipalities offered varying baskets of goods (government services) at a variety of prices (tax rates), that people with different personal valuations of these services and prices would move from one local community to another which maximizes their personal utility. Similar to how shopping and competition lead to efficiency in private good markets, this model holds that individual choices on where to live would lead to the equilibrium provision of local public goods in accordance with the tastes of residents, thereby sorting the population into optimum communities. Basically, if an individual doesn’t like the public goods provision of one town, they can move to the next town over. The model has the benefit of solving two major problems with government provision of public goods: preference revelation and preference aggregation.

Tiebout's paper argues that municipalities have two roads that they can go about in trying to acquire more persons in their community. One route is for the municipalities to act as a cartel, enforcing a singular tax rate among the various communities. In his paper, Tiebout claims this would shrink the right of voice and exit to the individual. The other option is for the municipalities to engage in tax competition. Tiebout claims the end result of both options is the same, as the tax rates of the various municipalities would converge around an average rate. Tax competition for Tiebout was an integral part of the market process between the government and its citizens.

== Formal model ==
A simple model (with assumptions to be detailed later) is helpful to illustrate Tiebout's insight and theory.

Suppose there are 2 * N families with identical income Y, 2 towns with N homes each, and each town supplies level G of local public schools. There are two types of families:

1. N families with kids, with utility U (C, G). These families value both private consumption C and public school provision G.
2. N elderly families without kids, with utility U (C). These families only value private consumption C and gain nothing from public school provision.

Assuming that in each town, G is decided by the median voter and financed equally by town residents, families with kids would move to towns where local public schools provided G = G*. Elderly families would move to towns where G = 0. Ultimately, one town would be all the families with kids and the other would be all the elderly families without kids. In this scenario, both towns could provide the optimal level of public good G (G* in the town with all the families with kids and 0 in the town with all the elderly families).

== Assumptions ==
The Tiebout model relies on a set of basic assumptions. The primary assumptions are that consumers are free to choose their communities, can move freely (at no cost) across towns, have perfect information, and there is equal financing of public goods. This essentially means that they can move from community to community at no cost, and that they know everything they need to know about services provided by local governments and the tax rates of all local governments. Further, the model requires that there be enough towns so that individuals can sort themselves into groups with similar preferences for public goods. For these reasons, the Tiebout model has been shown to be most accurate in suburban areas with many different independent communities. Moving between communities in these areas tends to have the lowest costs, and the set of possible choices is very diverse. In areas subject to rural flooding, Tiebout sorting explains why more affluent residents live in communities protected by river levees, while poorer residents tend to live without those expensive and rarely utilized protections. Lastly, the model also assumes that there are not externalities or spillover of public goods across towns.

The exact assumptions Tiebout made in his first statement of the model were:

1. Mobile consumers, who are free to choose where they live. There are no costs associated with moving.
2. Complete information.
3. Many communities to choose from.
4. There are no significant interactions with labor markets
5. Public goods do not spill over in terms of benefits/costs from one community to the next.
6. An optimal city size exists.
7. Communities try to achieve "optimal size".

== Factors determining optimal level of decentralisation ==
1. Tax-benefit linkage - goods like public roads with strong benefit linkage should be provided locally. On the other hand, welfare spending should be ideally handled by the state or federal authorities.
2. The extent of positive externalities - public goods with large spillover effects may be underprovided. In this case, the federal or state government can promote more investment from the local levels through grants.
3. Economy of scale - goods with large economies of scale (for example, national defense) are not efficiently provided by local jurisdictions.

== Evidence ==
The Tiebout model implies that when people have more choice, there will be uniformity in the tastes for public goods among town residents. Supportive evidence comes from a paper by Gramlich and Rubinfeld in 1982, which published survey data on Michigan households regarding their demand for public goods. They found that in larger metropolitan areas, where people have greater choice of which community they can live in, preferences for public goods were more similar within towns than in smaller areas with fewer independent towns to choose from. Moreover, in urban/suburban areas, residents were much more satisfied with the level of public goods spending than in nonurban areas where there are fewer ways to vote with one’s feet because there are fewer towns to move to.

Further evidence comes from journalist Bill Bishop and sociologist and statistician Robert Cushing in their book The Big Sort: Why the Clustering of Like-Minded America is Tearing Us Apart. Bishop and Cushing present original data to demonstrate crucial ways in which Americans have shopped, voted with their feet, and effectively sorted themselves geographically, economically, and politically around the turn of the twentieth century.

== See also ==
- Exit, Voice, and Loyalty
- Foot voting
- Tax choice
