= August Lösch =

German economist

- Born: 15 October 1906; Öhringen, Kingdom of Württemberg, German Empire
- Died: 30 May 1945 (aged 38); Ratzeburg, Schleswig-Holstein, Germany

Academic background
- Education: University of Bonn; University of Freiburg

Academic work
- Discipline: Regional science Urban economics
- Institutions: Kiel Institute for the World Economy

August Lösch (15 October 1906 – 30 May 1945) was a German economist, known for his contributions to regional science and urban economics.

Born in Öhringen, Württemberg, Lösch obtained his doctorate from the University of Bonn in 1932. His magnum opus, Die räumliche Ordnung der Wirtschaft (The economics of location), appeared in 1940 and was translated into English in 1954.

Lösch was a member of the "Confessing Church" (Bekennende Kirche), a Protestant group that spoke out openly against Adolf Hitler and was led by Martin Niemöller. He refused to emigrate and went into hiding to continue his anti-Nazi work, primarily in Kiel. His poor living conditions and health while in hiding contributed to his death from scarlet fever in Ratzeburg, just days after World War II had ended.

== Biography ==
Lösch was born in Öhringen, Kingdom of Württemberg, German Empire (now Baden-Württemberg, Germany). From 1908, he lived in Heidenheim, where he graduated from high school in 1925 and subsequently worked as an apprentice. From 1927 to 1930, Lösch studied at the University of Tübingen and at the University of Freiburg. Then from 1930 to 1931, he studied at the University of Bonn, where he was taught by Joseph Schumpeter, Walter Eucken, and Arthur Spiethoff. He earned a degree in economics from the University of Freiburg in 1931, and then a doctorate one year later from the University of Bonn.

Lösch studied demography and examined natural population growth in relation to its impact on labor supply and regional economic growth. This work then inspired Lösch to study the theory of production location. Lösch's work gained traction and global attention, earning him a Rockefeller scholarship. He visited the United States twice, in 1934 and 1936, where he studied the theories of the location of production and collected materials for his own research.

Lösch then worked at the Kiel Institute for the World Economy as a senior researcher between 1939 and 1945. While at the institute in 1940, Lösch published “Spatial Organization of the Economy” which received interest from the scientific community. The institute was evacuated from Kiel to Ratzeburg in October 1944 due to wartime conditions. During wartime, Lösch's health declined until he died of scarlet fever on May 30, 1945.

== Personal life ==
Lösch has been described as a creative yet stubborn by those who knew him. Although Lösch was born in Öhringen, he spent the majority of his childhood and later life in Heidenheim an der Brenz, which is something he was very proud of, mentioning that Heidenheim is the one place he feels at "home". During his time abroad in the United States, he received several offers to reside in the US during World War Two, however, declined these offers, saying "What will be the fate of Germany, if all of us leave the country?". After Lösch finished University, he moved to Kiel, Germany, to work as a part-time professor and researcher at Institut für Weltwirtschaft while his wife and family remained in Heidenheim.

In regard to his political and religious stance, Lösch was a part of the "Confessing Church" known as "Bekennende Kirche", which was a Protestant group against Nazi Germany under the ruling of Adolf Hitler. Being a Protestant who was openly in opposition towards Nazi Germany and Hitler put Lösch in a difficult situation where he had to choose between his moral integrity and surviving a grave period of political oppression.

When World War Two began, he resisted emigration, forcing him to go into hiding in Ratzeburg to continue his research in anti-Nazi work. When the war ended, Germany was left destroyed, which made it impossible for him to return home to his wife and family in Heidenheim. Since he was unable to return home, he remained in the poor living conditions in Ratzeburg where he continued his economic research. The end of his life was devastating; due to his impoverished state and weak health, he caught the scarlet fever infection and died shortly after without any of his loved ones or friends by his side. Lösch's research was granted little recognition at the time because of his resistance against Nazi Germany, but would nonetheless continue to influence economic research.

== Contributions to regional and urban economics ==
August Lösch is recognized as an early innovator in the subject of the New Economic Geography, known for his contributions to regional and urban economics, as well as his influence in expanding regional economics. Lösch's early research was primarily focused on international trade and population economics, which guided him to his important contributions in regional development and on the location theory, rewriting these economic concepts from a spatial perspective. His works built upon and extended the work of contemporary German geographer Walter Christaller.

Lösch's scientific writings focused on issues of the economic consequences of population decline, the impact of population dynamics on business cycles and capital markets and economics of aging. At the start of the 1930s, Lösch began his research in economic trade, more specifically, comparative advantage, tariff barriers in trade, the relationship between demography and trade, the role of different taxation systems and monetary policy, as well as cross-border shipping. Soon after, he began his research in location theory and regional development and had his first publication discussing location theory in 1939 in an article called 'The Nature of Economic Regions'. Lösch's his research and findings on economic spatial interactions and structure were significant, as he was the first person to illustrate a full general equilibrium system explaining the interrelationship of all locations which was shown in his theory of economic regions. Furthermore, Lösch is also known for the way in which he studied economic spatial interactions and structures, as he typically began with abstract theoretical paradigms on regions and spatial-economic behavior rather than evidence-based formations, as previous economists had used.

Overall, Lösch made a plenitude of significant findings in the world of economics, but his main contributions were to regional economics, specifically, pioneering the location theory, spatial equilibrium analysis and hierarchical spatial systems displaying a hexagonal pattern.

== Bibliography ==
- Lösch, August (1930). "Eine Auseinandersetzung über das Transferproblem". Schmollers Jahrbuch für Gesetzgebung, Verwaltung und Volkswirtschaft im Deutschen Reiche. 54 (6): 1093–1106.
- Lösch, August (1940). Die räumliche Ordnung der Wirtschaft: Eine Untersuchung über Standort, Wirtschaftsgebiete und internationalen Handel. Jena: Gustav Fischer Verlag. OCLC 611787688.
- Lösch, August (1954). The economics of location. New Haven: Yale University Press. ISBN 978-0-300-00727-5. OCLC 876506870.
