= Built Environment (journal) =

- Discipline: Urban planning
- Language: English

Publication details
- Former names: Official Architecture and Planning; Built Environment Quarterly
- Publisher: Alexandrine Press (UK)
- Frequency: Quarterly

Standard abbreviations
- ISO 4: Built Environ.

Indexing
- ISSN: 0263-7960

Links
- Journal homepage

Built Environment is a peer-reviewed academic journal focused on urban planning and related fields. It began in 1956 as Official Architecture and Planning and was renamed Built Environment in 1972. Between 1975 and 1978 it was known as Built Environment Quarterly. Topics discussed in the journal include: "architecture, conservation, economic development, environmental planning, health, housing, regeneration, social issues, spatial planning, sustainability, urban design, and transport." As of 2020, David Banister, Stephen Marshall, and Lucy Natarajan serve as editors. The commercial Alexandrine Press in the UK publishes the journal. Issues appear four times per year.

== See also ==
- List of planning journals
