= Foot voting =

Expressing preferences through actions

Foot voting is expressing one's preferences through one's actions, by voluntarily participating in or withdrawing from an activity, group, or process; especially, physical migration to leave a situation one does not like, or to move to a situation one regards as more beneficial. People who engage in foot voting are said to "vote with their feet".

Legal scholar Ilya Somin has described foot voting as "a tool for enhancing political freedom: the ability of the people to choose the political regime under which they wish to live". Communist leader Vladimir Lenin commented, "They voted with their feet," regarding Russian soldiers deserting the army of the Tsar. The concept has also been associated with Charles Tiebout, who pioneered the concept (although he did not use the term "foot voting") in a 1956 paper, and with Ronald Reagan, who advocated migration between states of the United States as a solution to unsatisfactory local conditions.

== Law and politics ==
Legal scholar Ilya Somin has argued that foot voting requires far less information (on the part of the citizens engaging in it) to be exercised effectively than does literal voting at the ballot box; that foot voters are more strongly motivated to acquire relevant information than are ballot-box voters; and that decentralized federalism promotes the welfare of citizens because it facilitates foot voting. Somin has also used foot voting to make a case for changes in international law to allow easier migration across international borders. Legal scholars Roderick M. Hills Jr., and Shitong Qiao have used China as a case study to argue that foot voting is ineffective unless meaningful ballot-box voting is also in place. Somin has rebutted this critique.

== Culture ==
Models from theoretical biology have been applied to elucidate the causal relationships between foot voting and the dissemination of human cultural characteristics.

== In popular culture ==
The popular fantasy author Terry Pratchett shared a critical view of foot voting in his 1998 book Carpe Jugulum:

"I understand you've traveled, Agnes," said Vlad, as she struggled. "So you'll know that so many people lead little lives, always under the whip of some king or ruler or master who won't hesitate to sacrifice them in battle or turn them out when they can't work anymore."

But they can run away, Perdita prompted. "But they can run away!"

"Really? On foot? With a family? And no money? Mostly they never even try. Most people put up with most things, Agnes."

== See also ==
- Dollar voting
- Exit, Voice, and Loyalty
- Human capital flight
- Jurisdiction shopping
- Panarchism
- Revealed preference
- Tiebout model
- Freedom of movement
- Illegal emigration
- Republikflucht
- White Flight
- Great Migration (African American)
