= Revista INVI =

- Discipline: Housing studies, urban planning and regional science
- Language: English, Spanish
- Edited by: Dr. Luis Campos Medina

Publication details
- Former name: Boletín INVI
- History: 1986–present
- Publisher: University of Chile (Chile)
- Frequency: Triannual

Standard abbreviations
- ISO 4: Rev. INVI

Indexing
- ISSN: 0718-1299 (print); 0718-8358 (web)

Links
- Journal homepage; Online archive; Journal page at SciELO

Revista INVI, until 2003 known as Boletín INVI, is a Chilean academic journal published by the Instituto de la Vivienda de la Facultad de Arquitectura y Urbanismo of the University of Chile. The subject of the journal is studies on architecture, urbanism, housing and urban studies.

According to SCImago journal ranking, Revista INVI is ranked Q1 for architecture and Q2 for urban studies.
