= Spatial Economic Analysis =

- Discipline: Economics
- Language: English
- Edited by: Ugo Fratesi

Publication details
- History: 2006-present
- Publisher: Taylor and Francis on behalf of the Regional Studies Association and the British and Irish Section of the Regional Science Association International
- Frequency: Quarterly
- Open access: Hybrid
- Impact factor: 1.5 (2023)

Standard abbreviations
- ISO 4: Spat. Econ. Anal.

Indexing
- ISSN: 1742-1772 (print); 1742-1780 (web)
- OCLC no.: 75496516

Links
- Journal homepage; Online access; Online archive

Spatial Economic Analysis is a quarterly peer-reviewed academic journal covering the development of theory and methods in spatial economics. It is published by Routledge on behalf of the Regional Studies Association and the British and Irish Section of the Regional Science Association International. The editor-in-chief is Professor Ugo Fratesi Politecnico di Milano, Italy. He succeeded Paul Elhorst in June 2023.
