= Papers in Regional Science =

Regional science academic journal

- Discipline: Geography, Environmental Studies and Economics
- Language: English
- Edited by: Rosella Nicolini

Publication details
- History: 1955-Present
- Publisher: Elsevier on behalf of the Regional Science Association International.
- Frequency: Quarterly
- Open access: Yes
- Impact factor: 2.4 (2023)

Standard abbreviations
- ISO 4: Pap. Reg. Sci.

Indexing
- ISSN: 1056-8190 (print); 1435-5957 (web)

Links
- Journal homepage; Online access

Papers in Regional Science is a quarterly peer-reviewed academic journal published by Wiley-Blackwell on behalf of the Regional Science Association International (RSAI). The journal was established in 1955. The journal covers topics in regional science. These topics include, but are not limited to, behavioural modelling of location, transportation, migration decisions, land use and urban development, environmental and ecological analysis, resource management, urban and regional policy analysis, geographical information systems, and spatial statistics.

According to the Journal Citation Reports, the journal has a 2011 impact factor of 1.43, ranking it 23rd out of 73 journals in the category "Geography", 38th out of 89 journals in the category "Environmental Studies" and 74th out of 321 journals in the category "Economics".

== See also ==
- Annals of Regional Science
- Journal of Regional Science
- International Regional Science Review
- List of planning journals
