= Journal of Transport and Land Use =

- Discipline: Transportation
- Language: English
- Edited by: Ying Song

Publication details
- History: 2008–present
- Publisher: University of Minnesota (United States)
- Frequency: Triannually
- Open access: Yes
- Impact factor: 2.4 (2025)

Standard abbreviations
- ISO 4: J. Transp. Land Use

Indexing
- ISSN: 1938-7849
- OCLC no.: 144477608

Links
- Journal homepage

The Journal of Transport and Land Use is an open access peer-reviewed academic journal covering the interaction of transport and land use that was established in 2008. As of August 2011, it is the official journal of the World Society for Transport and Land Use Research. It is operated on a volunteer basis with institutional support from the Center for Transportation Studies and the Networks, Economics, and Urban Systems Research Group at the University of Minnesota, where it is published three times per year. The founding editor is David M. Levinson and the editor-in-chief since 2023 is Ying Song.

== Abstracting ==
The journal is abstracted and indexed in RePEc and the Transportation Research Board TRID database According to the Journal Citation Reports, the journal has a 2025 impact factor of 2.4.
