= Tord Palander =

Swedish economist

- Born: 6 October 1902; Stockholm, Sweden
- Died: 1972

Academic background
- Education: Stockholm University

Academic work
- Discipline: Regional science, urban economics
- Institutions: University of Uppsala; Gothenburg School of Business, Economics and Law

Tord Folkeson Palander (6 October 1902 – 1972) was a Swedish economist. His Ph.D. thesis, Beiträge zur Standortstheorie (Contributions to Location Theory), completed in 1935 at the Stockholm University College, laid foundations to regional science.

Palander first studied chemical engineering at the Royal Institute of Technology, and graduated in 1926. He then started to study economics at the Stockholm University College. In 1941, Palander became a professor at the Gothenburg School of Business, Economics and Law, and in 1948 at the University of Uppsala.
