= Regional Studies Association =

The Regional Studies Association is a learned society with an international network of academics, policy makers and practitioner members. It was founded in 1965, following the foundation of the Regional Science Association in the USA and International Centre for Regional Planning and Development in the UK. Regional studies (sometimes called area studies in the USA) is a field of interdisciplinary research focusing on the sub-national, such as city and regional development, urbanisation, economic inequalities and migration issues. The research not only crosses the boundaries of countries, but also the disciplines of geography, economics, sociology and planning. The Association is registered with the UK Charity Commission (Charity No. 1084165) and Companies House (Company No. 04116288). The Association organises international events and various micro-grant awards.

The Association has collaborated with the Smith Institute to produce several reports, including 'Britain for sale? Perspectives on the costs and benefits of foreign ownership' (2016), 'Where next for Local Enterprise Partnerships?' (2013) and 'Changing Gear – Is Localism the New Regionalism?' (2012). In 2018, Towards Cohesion Policy 4.0: Structural Transformation and Inclusive Growth was published by the RSA.

The Regional Studies Association are members of various bodies, including Memnet, the Academy of Social Sciences and the Foundation Science and Technology.

== Publications ==
There are five scholarly journals from the Association, published by the Routledge Taylor & Francis Group.

Regional Studies publishes interdisciplinary research crossing the boundaries of economic, environmental, political and social aspects of regional development and policy-making.

Spatial Economic Analysis focuses on spatial economics and is published with the British and Irish Section of the Regional Science Association International.

Territory Politics Governance focuses on research and theory relating to territory, politics, economics and the governance of space.

Area Development and Policy publishes research from the Global South and Greater BRICS.

Regional Studies, Regional Science is an interdisciplinary open-access journal with a mentored Early Career section.
