= European Urban and Regional Studies =

- Discipline: Urban studies
- Language: English
- Edited by: Adrian Smith, Nick Henry

Publication details
- History: 1994–present
- Publisher: SAGE Publications
- Frequency: Quarterly
- Impact factor: 4.842 (2021)

Standard abbreviations
- ISO 4: Eur. Urban Reg. Stud.

Indexing
- ISSN: 0969-7764 (print); 1461-7145 (web)
- LCCN: 97652843
- OCLC no.: 613531914

Links
- Journal homepage; Online access; Online archive

European Urban and Regional Studies is a quarterly peer-reviewed academic journal that covers the field of urban studies with an emphasis on Europe. It was established in 1994 and is published by SAGE Publications.

== Abstracting and indexing ==
The journal is abstracted and indexed in Scopus and the Social Sciences Citation Index. According to the Journal Citation Reports, its 2021 impact factor is 4.842, ranking it 35th out of 127 in the category "Environmental Studies", and 9th out of 42 journals in the category "Urban Studies".
