= Journal of Planning Literature =

- Discipline: Planning
- Language: English
- Edited by: Gulsah Akar

Publication details
- History: 1985-present
- Publisher: SAGE Publications in association with the Knowlton School of Architecture, Ohio State University College of Engineering (United States)
- Frequency: Quarterly
- Impact factor: 3.15 (2017)

Standard abbreviations
- ISO 4: J. Plan. Lit.

Indexing
- ISSN: 0885-4122 (print); 1552-6593 (web)
- LCCN: 91641155
- OCLC no.: 12627034

Links
- Journal homepage; Online access; Online archive

The Journal of Planning Literature is a peer-reviewed academic journal that publishes critical review articles and abstracts of recent literature in the field of urban and regional planning. The journal's editor-in-chief is Rachel Kleit (Ohio State University). The journal was established in 1985 and is currently published by SAGE Publications in association with the Ohio State University.

== Abstracting and indexing ==
The Journal of Planning Literature is abstracted and indexed in Scopus and the Social Sciences Citation Index. According to the Journal Citation Reports, its 2017 impact factor is 3.15, ranking it 3 out of 40 journals in the category "Urban Studies" and 6 out of 57 journals in the category "Planning & Development".
