= Journal of Urban Economics =

- Discipline: Urban economics
- Language: English
- Edited by: Nathaniel Baum-Snow, Kristian Behrens

Publication details
- History: 1974-present
- Publisher: Elsevier
- Frequency: Bimonthly
- Impact factor: 3.637 (2020)

Standard abbreviations
- ISO 4: J. Urban Econ.

Indexing
- CODEN: JUECDW
- ISSN: 0094-1190
- LCCN: 74644329
- OCLC no.: 1793720

Links
- Journal homepage; Online access

The Journal of Urban Economics is a bimonthly peer-reviewed academic journal covering urban economics. It is considered the premier journal in the field of urban economics. It was established in 1974 by Edwin Mills and is published by Elsevier. The editors-in-chief are Nathaniel Baum-Snow (University of Toronto) and Kristian Behrens (Université du Québec à Montréal). According to the Journal Citation Reports, the journal has a 2020 impact factor of 3.637.

Edwin Mills was editor from 1974 to 1991. Jan K. Brueckner was editor from 1991 to 2007. Stuart Rosenthal was editor from 2007 to 2023.
