= Annals of Regional Science =

The Annals of Regional Science
- Discipline: Regional science, urban studies, environmental studies
- Language: English
- Edited by: Alessandra Faggian, Hong Sok (Brian) Kim, Janet E. Kohlhase, and Carlianne Patrick

Publication details
- History: 1967-present
- Publisher: Springer
- Open access: Hybrid
- Impact factor: 2.4 (2025)

Standard abbreviations
- ISO 4: Ann. Reg. Sci.

Indexing
- ISSN: 0570-1864 (print); 1432-0592 (web)

Links
- Journal homepage; Online access; Online archive

The Annals of Regional Science is a peer-reviewed academic journal covering regional science, urban studies, urban planning, and environmental research and policy. It is the official journal of the Western Regional Science Association and is published by Springer. The editors-in-chief are Alessandra Faggian (Gran Sasso Science Institute), Hong Sok (Brian) Kim (Seoul National University), Janet E. Kohlhase (University of Houston), and Carlianne Patrick (Georgia State University).

The journal publishes research in which spatial dimensions play a central role, including regional economics, resource management, location theory, urban and regional planning, transportation and communication, population distribution, and environmental quality. Its first volume was published in December 1967.

== Abstracting and indexing ==
The journal is abstracted and indexed in Scopus, the Social Sciences Citation Index, EconLit, RePEc, Current Contents/Social & Behavioral Sciences, EBSCO databases, and ProQuest databases. The journal had a 2025 impact factor of 2.4.

== See also ==
- Western Regional Science Association
- Journal of Regional Science
- Papers in Regional Science
- International Regional Science Review
- List of planning journals
