= Environment and Planning =

- Discipline: Human geography, urban studies
- Language: English

Publication details
- History: 1969-present
- Publisher: SAGE Publications (Pion until 2015)

Standard abbreviations
- ISO 4: Environ. Plan.

Links
- Journal homepage; Environment and Planning A; Environment and Planning B; Environment and Planning C; Environment and Planning D; Environment and Planning E

The Environment and Planning journals are five academic journals. They are interdisciplinary journals with a spatial focus of primary interest to human geographers and city planners. The journals are also of interest to the scholars of economics, sociology, political science, urban planning, architecture, ecology, anthropology and cultural studies.

The five journals are:

- Environment and Planning A: Economy and Space: The original Environment and Planning journal, launched in 1969. It focuses on urban and regional issues.
- Environment and Planning B: Urban Analytics and City Science: Introduced in 1974 as 'Planning and Design' to provide a focus on methodological urban issues, focusing again on the design and planning methods, built environment, planning and policy.
- Environment and Planning C: Politics and Space: Established in 1983 as 'Government and Policy'. Beginning in 2017, the focus changed to critical and interdisciplinary research on the 'spatialization of politics and the politicization of spatial relations'.
- Environment and Planning D: Society and Space: Launched as Society and Space in 1979 and joined the Environment and Planning series in 1983. Initially devoted to human geography, the journal is now broadening its scope and welcomes submissions from geography, cultural studies, economics, anthropology, sociology, politics, international relations, literary studies, architecture, planning, history, women's studies, art history, and philosophy.
- Environment and Planning E: Nature and Space: focussing on nature and society issues launched in 2018.

In the 2001 Research Assessment Exercise in the United Kingdom, the highest number of submissions from geographers were articles from Environment and Planning A, with Environment and Planning D fourth in the list.

The journals were published by Pion, a small publisher, until 2015, when Pion was taken over by SAGE.
