= Walter Christaller =

German geographer

- Born: 21 April 1893; Berneck, Württemberg
- Died: 9 March 1969 (aged 75); Königstein im Taunus, Hesse
- Known for: Central place theory
- Scientific career
- Fields: Geography
- Doctoral advisor: Robert Gradmann

Walter Christaller (21 April 1893 – 9 March 1969) was a German geographer whose principal contribution to the discipline is central place theory, first published in 1933. This groundbreaking theory was the foundation of the study of cities as systems of cities, rather than simple hierarchies or single entities. He was primarily concerned with the urban space and worked on the role of towns as geographic-economic units, besides analyzing the relationships between towns of the same region.

== Life ==
Walter Christaller was born to Erdmann Gottreich and Helene Christaller, an author of Christian-themed children's novels at Berneck (today part of Altensteig in Germany. His paternal grandfather Johann Gottlieb Christaller was a linguist and a Christian missionary in West Africa.

Before 1914, Christaller began studies in philosophy and political economics and subsequently served in the German Army during World War I. He was homeschooled and educated at Heidelberg University and the Ludwig-Maximilians-Universität München. In the 1920s, he pursued a variety of occupations. In 1929, he resumed graduate studies, which led to his famous dissertation on Central Place Theory, which he published as the Die zentralen Orte in Süddeutschland (The Central Places in Southern Germany), in 1933.

In the late 1930s, he held a short-lived academic appointment at the University of Freiburg. Whether Christaller was a member of the Nazi Party is disputed. He moved into government service, for Himmler's SS-Planning and Soil Office, during the Second World War. Christaller's task was to draw up plans for reconfiguring the economic geography of Germany's eastern conquests (Generalplan Ost), primarily in Czechoslovakia and Poland but also, if successful, Russia itself. Christaller was given special charge of planning occupied Poland, and he did so by using his central place theory as an explicit guide. His work was extended by fellow German August Lösch.

After the war, he joined the Communist Party of Germany and became politically active. In addition, he devoted himself to tourism geography. Since 1950, his Central Place Theory has been used to restructure municipal relationships and boundaries in the Federal Republic of Germany, and the system is still in place today.

In 1950, Christaller, together with Paul Gauss and Emil Meynen, founded the German Association of Applied Geography (DVAG). The Walter Christaller Award for Applied Geography is named after him.

He died in Königstein im Taunus, West Germany, on 9 March 1969.

== See also ==
- List of geographers
