= Journal of Regional Science =

- Discipline: Regional Science
- Language: English
- Edited by: Steven Brakman, N. Edward Coulson, Alessandra Faggian, Yasusada Murata, and Siqi Zheng

Publication details
- History: 1958-present
- Publisher: Wiley-Blackwell
- Frequency: 5/year
- Impact factor: 2.713 (2020)

Standard abbreviations
- ISO 4: J. Reg. Sci.

Indexing
- ISSN: 0022-4146 (print); 1467-9787 (web)

Links
- Journal homepage; Online access; Online archive

The Journal of Regional Science is a peer-reviewed academic journal published by Wiley-Blackwell. Proceeded in the field of Regional Science only by Papers and Proceedings of the Regional Science Association (now Papers in Regional Science), the JRS was established in 1958 and published by the now-defunct Regional Science Research Institute in Philadelphia. The current Managing Editors are Steven Brakman (University of Groningen), N. Edward Coulson(University of California - Irvine), Alessandra Faggian (Gran Sasso Science Institute, L'Aquila, Italy), Yasusada Murata (Nihon University, and Siqi Zheng (MIT center for Real estate). Contributors hold positions in a variety of academic disciplines, but (in no particular order) dominated by economics, geography, agricultural economics, rural sociology, urban and regional planning, and civil engineering. Articles are usually empirical, occasionally methodological or theoretical, but always quantitative.

According to the Journal Citation Reports, the journal has a 2016 impact factor of 1.743, ranking it 19th out of 55 journals in the category "Planning & Development".

== See also ==
- Annals of Regional Science
- International Regional Science Review
- Papers in Regional Science
- List of planning journals
