= Walter Isard =

American economist

Walter Isard (April 19, 1919 – November 6, 2010) was a prominent American economist, the principal founder of the discipline of regional science, as well as one of the main founders of the discipline of peace studies and Peace economics.

== Life and contributions ==
Born on April 19, 1919, in Philadelphia, the son of Jewish immigrants from Eastern Europe. Isard graduated with honors at the age of 20 from Temple University, in 1939. He next went to Harvard University, studying under Alvin Hansen and Abbott Usher. There, he developed a research interest in building construction, transportation development, the location of economic activities, and the ensuing cycles of growth and stagnation that characterized the 1920–1940 period.

In 1941–42, he studied at the University of Chicago, where his interest in mathematics was rekindled. Later, he was affiliated with the National Planning Resources Board, where he completed his Harvard Ph.D. dissertation in 1943. Subsequently, he served as a conscientious objector in the Civilian Public Service; during the night at the state mental hospital where he was assigned, he translated into English the works of the German location theorists, including Lösch, Weigmann, Engländer, and Predöhl.

Now focusing primarily on location issues, Isard obtained a part-time teaching position at Harvard in 1945, and did some work on the location of the U.S. steel industry, as well as some work on the costs and benefits of atomic power.

At Harvard, Isard became well acquainted with Wassily Leontief and helped him adapt his idea of an input-output model to a local economy. Between 1949 and 1953 Isard was employed as a research associate at Harvard, but teaching a course, designed by himself, on location theory and regional development. Through this course, and through discussions with other economists, Isard managed to attract many other scholars to these fields. Already by 1948 the American Economic Association was organizing sessions on regional development at its annual conference. At the 1950 American Economic Association meeting, Isard met with 26 other like-minded economists and came up with a clearer idea of what the newly emerging field of regional science should look like: it would be interdisciplinary, and it required some novel concepts, data, and techniques. As part of the effort to develop regional science Isard found himself at the center of a network of scholars from economics, city planning, political science, sociology, and geography.

In 1953 Isard moved to MIT, taking a position in the Department of City and Regional Planning. It was while he was at MIT that the name regional science solidified as the name for his new field. In 1954 the Regional Science Association was created, with Isard as its first president and then honorary chairman. In 1956 Isard left MIT for the University of Pennsylvania, attracted by the opportunity to head up a new PhD-awarding academic department, the department of Regional Science. Isard worked quickly to make regional science widely recognized, publishing three important books over the next four years: Location and Space Economy (1956); Industrial Complex Analysis and Regional Development (1959); and Methods of Regional Analysis (1960). In 1956 he also helped found the Regional Science Research Institute at Penn, and in 1958 the new field's flagship journal, the Journal of Regional Science. In 1960 Isard worked to spread regional science to Europe, and in 1962 he helped set up regional science associations for Latin America and East Asia.

In 1963 Isard assembled a group of scholars in Malmö, Sweden, for the purpose of establishing the Peace Research Society. In 1973, this group became the Peace Science Society. Like regional science, peace science was viewed as an interdisciplinary and international effort to develop a special set of concepts, techniques and data. In 1977 Isard stepped down as chair of the department of regional science at Penn in order to devote more time to peace science, and moved to Cornell University in 1979. In 1985, Isard was elected a member of the Economic Sciences section of the National Academy of Sciences.

Isard died in Drexel Hill, Pennsylvania.

== Selected books ==
- Isard, Walter. 1952. Atomic Power, an Economic and Social Analysis; a Study in Industrial Location and Regional Economic Development. New York: Blakiston.
- Isard, Walter. 1956. Location and Space-economy; a General Theory Relating to Industrial Location, Market Areas, Land Use, Trade, and Urban Structure. Cambridge: Published jointly by the Technology Press of Massachusetts Institute of Technology and Wiley.
- Isard, Walter. 1957. Municipal Costs and Revenues Resulting from Community Growth. Wellesley, Mass: Chandler-Davis Publ. Co.
- Isard, Walter. 1959. Industrial Complex Analysis and Regional Development; a Case Study of Refinery-petrochemical-synthetic-fiber Complexes and Puerto Rico. Cambridge: Technology Press of the Massachusetts Institute of Technology.
- Isard, Walter. 1960. Methods of Regional Analysis; an Introduction to Regional Science. Cambridge: Published jointly by the Technology Press of the Massachusetts Institute of Technology and Wiley, New York.
- Isard, Walter. 1969. General Theory: Social, Political, Economic, and Regional, with Particular Reference to Decision-making Analysis. Cambridge, Massachusetts: M.I.T. Press.
- Isard, Walter. 1971. Regional Input-output Study: Recollections, Reflections, and Diverse Notes on the Philadelphia Experience. Cambridge, Massachusetts: MIT Press.
- Isard, Walter. 1975. Introduction to Regional Science. Englewood Cliffs, N.J: Prentice-Hall.
- Isard, Walter. 1972. Ecologic-economic Analysis for Regional Development; Some Initial Explorations with Particular Reference to Recreational Resource Use and Environmental Planning. New York: Free Press.
- Peace Research Society (International). 1969. Vietnam: Some Basic Issues and Alternatives. Cambridge, Massachusetts: Schenkman Pub. Co.
