= Regional Science Association International =

Association of scholarly societies

- RSAI's old logo
- Abbreviation: RSAI
- Formation: 1954
- Type: Professional association
- Legal status: Non-profit
- Purpose: Promoting the field of regional science
- Headquarters: Washington, D.C., United States
- Region served: Worldwide
- Members: Regional scientists, economists, geographers, economic geographer, planners
- President: Hans Westlund (as of 2024)
- Main organ: Council
- Website: www.regionalscience.org

The Regional Science Association International (RSAI) is a cluster of scholarly societies whose members engage in regional science.

== Origins ==
In the late 1940s and the early 1950s, the economist Walter Isard worked to draw together a group of academics interested in analyzing regional (i.e., sub-national) development. These academics were drawn from a number of disciplines: economics, geography, city planning, political science and rural sociology. Naming their new approach regional science, they envisioned it as an interdisciplinary effort, one that would require unique theoretical concepts, methodological tools, and data. Because their effort was interdisciplinary, no existing academic organization brought the participants together; they therefore created their own organization, the Regional Science Association, which first met in December 1954.

By 1961, the RSA had 960 members, and its first local "section", which organized conferences for regional scientists located in the western United States. The next section to form (in 1963) was in Japan, followed by sections throughout Europe, as well as in India, Argentina, and Brazil. In 1969, the Western section and the Japan section began to cooperate in holding a biennial Pacific Rim international conference.

Gradually issues of coordination among the various sections were worked out, resulting in much the present structure by 1990. The Regional Science Association International (RSAI) now functions as the umbrella organization for three other organizations: the Pacific Regional Science Conference Organization, the North American Regional Science Council, and the European Regional Science Association. Each of these serve as the umbrella organization for a number of other organizations, as seen in the next section.

== Structure ==
Regional Science Association International is the umbrella organization for all affiliated regional science associations:

- The Pacific Regional Science Conference Organization An umbrella organization for the following associations:
  - Australia New Zealand Regional Science Association
  - Canadian Regional Science Association
  - Chinese Regional Science Association—Taiwan
  - Indonesian Regional Science Association
  - Japan Section of the Regional Science Association International, English
  - Korean Regional Science Association
  - Mexican Association of Science for Regional Development
  - The Western Regional Science Association
- The North American Regional Science Council An umbrella organization for the following associations:
  - Canadian Regional Science Association
  - The Mid-Continent Regional Science Association
  - The Northeast Regional Science Association
  - The Southern Regional Science Association
  - The Western Regional Science Association
- The European Regional Science Association An umbrella organization for the following associations:
  - British and Irish Section of the RSAI - RSAi BIS
  - Italian Regional Science Association
  - German Speaking Section of the RSAI
  - Nordic Section of the RSAI
  - Portuguese Section of the Regional Science Association
  - Spanish Regional Science Association
  - Regional Science Association Netherlands

== Sources ==
- Boyce, David. (2004). "A short history of the field of regional science." Papers in Regional Science. 83(1): 31-57.
- David Plane's links to Regional Science related websites
