= Hold-up problem =

Economic dilemma

In economics, the hold-up problem is central to the theory of incomplete contracts, and shows the difficulty in writing complete contracts. A hold-up problem arises when two factors are present:

1. Parties to a future transaction must make noncontractible relationship-specific investments before the transaction takes place.
2. The specific form of the optimal transaction (such as quality-level specifications, time of delivery, what quantity of units) cannot be determined with certainty beforehand.

The hold-up problem is a situation where two parties may be able to work most efficiently by cooperating but refrain from doing so because of concerns that they may give the other party increased bargaining power and thus reduce their own profits. When party A has made a prior commitment to a relationship with party B, the latter can 'hold up' the former for the value of that commitment. The hold-up problem leads to severe economic cost and might also lead to underinvestment.

== Underinvestment ==
It is often argued that the possibility of a hold-up can lead to underinvestment in relation-specific investment and thus inefficiency. Underinvestment occurs because investors cannot guarantee themselves a sufficient share of the return through ex post bargaining. Consequently, predictions of the outcome are very sensitive to assumptions made about the bargaining process. The bargaining process can be seen as a game with multiple equilibria. Underinvestment may occur only when the agent fails to coordinate on an efficient equilibrium.

== Principle ==
In a scenario where two risk-neutral parties S (supplier) and B (Buyer) can make profit by working together, it is efficient to work together as long as the buyers' valuation exceeds the sellers' costs (Schmitz, 2001). When the two parties could agree on a binding contract covering the whole period of the investment and anticipating all possible outcomes and providing protection for both parties in every situation that may arise at the time the investment is made, the parties would have enough confidence to make the investment, and both parties could enjoy high profits. Then, it can be assumed that there are no wealth constraints and there is no private information. According to the Coase theorem, voluntary bargaining results in trade whenever it is efficient. However, making such a contract is often not possible for these four reasons:

- Unforeseeable external factors
- Lack of trust
- Quality problems
- Asymmetric information

The initial contract can cover only short-term situations. Eventually, renegotiation is needed, which provides an opportunity for e.g. S to hold up B. As S knows that the investment is a significant cost to B and tries to use this as leverage to negotiate an increase in its prices. In that case, S has more bargaining power, compared to B, and tries to use it to its own advantage. The source of power lies in the investment of B. For B it is hard to find out whether or not the raise in prices is reasonable. In an extreme case, S could demand 100% of the profits if the only alternative to B is to lose the entire initial investment. Even if the outcome would be Pareto efficient, B might not accept the agreement. If the renegotiations turn out to be unsuccessful both parties are worse off: B has made an investment that goes to waste, and S lost a customer.

Inefficiency is caused by the hold-up problem when B is reluctant to make the investment ex ante from the fear that S uses its extra bargaining power to its own advantage. In that case the supplier is 'holding up' the buyer.

== Examples ==
=== Auto industry ===
A historic example concerns the US car industry, but the example is sharply disputed by Coase (2000). Fisher Body had an exclusive contract with General Motors (GM) to supply car body parts and so Fisher Body was the only company to deliver the components according to GM's specifications. In 1920, a sharp increase in demand occurred that was above expectations. It is claimed that Fisher Body used the unforeseen situation to hold up GM by increasing the price for the additional parts produced. It has been said that the hold up led to GM acquiring Fisher Body in 1926.

=== Democratization of South Africa ===
During transition out of South African apartheid, many white elites feared that democratization would result in tyranny of the majority. Now that fair elections were held, many wealthy whites feared that the longtime poor blacks (or their elected representatives) would expropriate land or wealth from the white minority. For this reason there was white resistance against democratic and fair elections. To ensure a peaceful transition (and to uphold the credibility of the elections), the African National Congress needed to make a commitment to protect the incomes and wealth of the white minority. This commitment allowed whites to respect the results of a democratic election which would put the majority blacks in power. That credible commitment from the ANC made the new democratic regime sufficiently attractive to whites in South Africa, otherwise they would not have agreed to transition out of minority rule.

This problem arises more generally in a political context: dictators such as Saddam Hussein do not surrender to superior force and leave power when it should be rational to do so, because they have no means of assurance that their property and their lives will be protected if they leave power.

== Solutions ==
=== Contractual ===
Rogerson (1992) showed the existence of a first-best contractual solution to the hold-up problem in even extremely complex environments involving x agents with arbitrarily complex transaction decisions and utility functions. He shows that three important environmental assumptions must be made:

1. No externalities so that the investment of each agent directly affects only its own type. Therefore, the following situation is not allowed: a situation where a seller's investment has influence on the quality of the product that he sells to the buyer.
2. Risk neutrality.
3. Only one investor has partially private information so that only one agent makes an investment decision.

Furthermore, the solution also requires 'powerful' contracts to be written.

1. Complex contracts can be written.
2. Each party commits to participate so all parties are willing to sign the contract at the time of signing.
3. The contract prevents from renegotiating the outcomes of the contract so that renegotiation in equilibrium is not possible.

According to Rogerson (1992) the hold-up problem does not necessarily create inefficiencies; when it does, one of the above requirements is not satisfied. The requirements are necessary to come to an absolutely best solution.

If there are direct externalities and renegotiation cannot be prevented, even under symmetric information, underinvestment cannot be avoided. If there are direct externalities, the seller's investment is a hidden action and the buyer has private information about its valuation, the absolutely best solution may not be attained even when the parties have full commitment power. In the absence of direct externalities, simple contracts may solve the hold-up problem even when each party has private information about its valuation. Maskin and Tirole (1999) argue that complex contracts can solve the hold-up problem when there are ex ante indescribable contingencies, and Hart and Moore (1999) argue that the solution does not work when renegotiation cannot be ruled out. Taken together, whether or not suitable contracts can solve the hold-up problem is disputed in contract theory. In an experimental study, Hoppe and Schmitz (2011) found that option contracts may alleviate the hold-up problem even when renegotiation is possible, which may be explained by Hart and Moore's (2008) idea that contracts may serve as reference points.

=== Option contracts and renegotiation ===
Nöldeke and Schmidt (1995) argued that the underinvestment problem due to the hold-up problem is eliminated if parties are able to write a simple option contract. Such a contract gives the seller the right but not the obligation to deliver a fixed quantity of the good and also makes the contractual payment of the buyer dependent on the delivery decision of the seller. Thus, this contract does not depend on renegotiation or complicated mechanisms, but its crucial feature is that one of the parties can unilaterally decide whether the trade takes place. However, such a contract is unachievable unless it is possible to enforce the payments conditional on the delivery decision of the seller. That means that the court must be able to verify delivery of the good to the buyer by the seller. The possibility was ruled out in earlier research where it was assumed that when trade fails, it is not possible for the court to distinguish whether the buyer did not accept the delivery or the seller refused to supply.

=== Vertical integration ===
The organization and governance structure of a firm might be seen as a mechanism for dealing with a hold-up problem. A solution to the hold-up problem is vertical integration such as a merger in which all parts of the body are being produced internally rather than outside. Vertical integration shifts the ownership of the organizational asset of the firm and therewith creates more flexibility and avoids potential of a hold-up. In that way, the (transaction) costs associated with contractually induced hold-ups are saved and also the costs associated with the number of contracts written and executed. Hold-up problems are created from the existence of firm-specific investments, but also from the set of long-term contracts that are used in the presence of the certain investments. Whether a vertical integration is adopted as a solution to the hold-up problem depends on the magnitude of the specific investment and the ability to write long-term contracts, flexible enough to avoid a potential hold-up. However, the ability to write flexible long-term contracts strongly depends upon the underlying market uncertainty and the reputation of the company. Therefore, those factors will also influence the likelihood of vertical integration. The extent to which vertical integration can alleviate the hold-up problem also depends on the information structure. While traditional incomplete contracting models of vertical integration such as Grossman and Hart (1986) assume symmetric information, Schmitz (2006) has extended the incomplete contracting framework to allow for asymmetric information.

== See also ==
- Commitment Device
- Corporate finance approaches:
  - Contingent value rights
  - Earnout
  - Strip financing
- Contract theory
- Game theory
- Precommitment
- Specific asset
- Theory of the firm
- Vertical monopoly

== General and cited references ==
- Balkenborg, D., Kaplan, T.R., & Miller, T. (2010). A simple economic teaching experiment on the hold-up problem. MPRA Paper No. 24772.
- Che, Y.K., & Sákovics, J. (2008). H old-up Problem. The New Palgrave Dictionary of Economics, 2nd Edition. Abstract.
- Edlin, A. & Reichelstein, S. (1996). Holdups, Standard Breach Remedies, and Optimal Investment. American Economic Review, 86(3), pp. 478–501.
- Grossman, S. J. and O. D. Hart, 1986. The Costs and Benefits of Ownership: A Theory of Vertical and Lateral Integration. Journal of Political Economy, 94(4), p. 691-719. JSTOR 1833199.
- Coase, R.H. (2000). The Acquisition of Fisher Body by General Motors. Journal of Law and Economics, 1(43), 15-32.
- Ellingsen, T., & Johannesson, M. (2004). Is There a Hold-Up Problem? The Scandinavian Journal of Economics, 3(106), 475-494.
- Hart, O. (1995). Firms, contracts, and financial structure. Oxford & New York: Oxford University Press, Clarendon Press.
- Hart, O., & Moore, J. (1988). Incomplete Contracts and Renegotiation. Econometrica, 4(56), 755-785.
- Holmström, B., & Roberts, J. (1998). The Boundaries of the Firm Revisited. The Journal of Economic Perspectives, 4(12), 73-94.
- Hoppe, E. I., & Schmitz, P. W. (2011). Can contracts solve the hold-up problem? Experimental evidence. Games and Economic Behavior, 73(1), 186-199.
- Klein, B. (1998). Vertical Integration as Organizational Ownership: The Fisher Body-General Motors Relationship Revisited. Journal of Law, Economics, and Organization, 1(4), 199-213.
- Nöldeke, G., & Schmidt, K. (1995). Option Contracts and Renegotiation: A Solution to the Hold-up Problem. The RAND Journal of Economics, 2(26), 163-179.
- Rogerson, W.P. (1992). Contractual Solutions to the Hold-Up Problem. The Review of Economic Studies, 4(59), 777-793. JSTOR 2297997
- Schmitz, P.W. (2001). The Hold-Up Problem and Incomplete Contracts: A Survey of Recent Topics in Contract Theory. Bulletin of Economic Research, 1(53), 1-17.
- Schmitz, P.W. (2006). Information Gathering, Transaction Costs, and the Property Rights Approach. American Economic Review, 96(1): 422–434.
- Tirole, J. (1988). The Theory of Industrial Organization. Massachusetts : Massachusetts Institute of Technology.
- Tsilingiris, N. (2020). Responding to COVID-19 invites a 'hold-up' problem when outsourcing public services. LSE Social Policy Blog. Link.
- Williamson, O.E., 1979. Transactions-Cost Economics: The Governance of Contractual Relations. Journal of Law and Economics, 22(2), pp. 233–62.
