= State ownership =

Ownership of industry, assets, or businesses by a public body

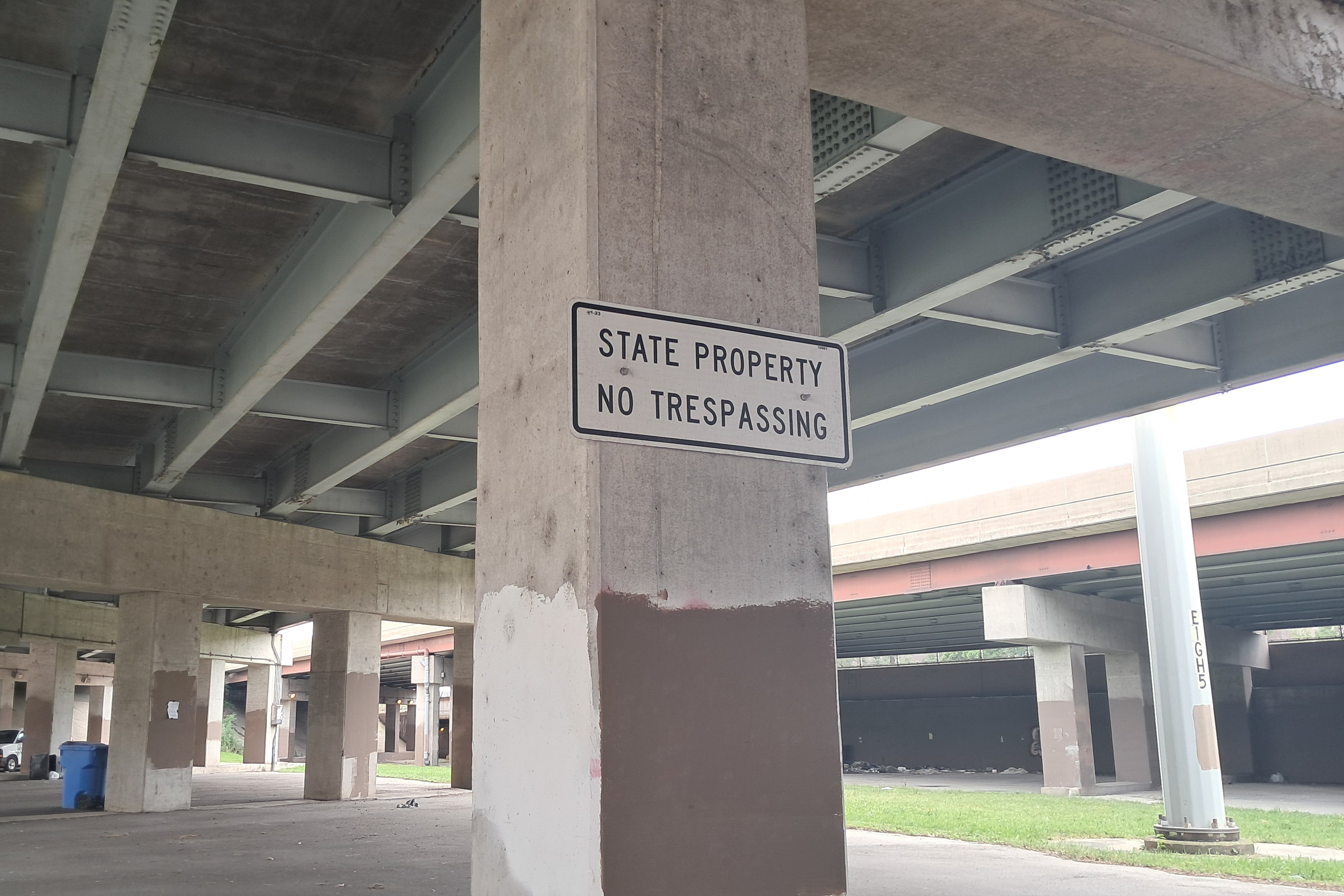
Sign denoting state property at a highway right of way in Chicago, Illinois, United States

State ownership, also called public ownership or government ownership, is the ownership of an industry, asset, property, or enterprise by the national government of a country or state, or a public body representing a community, as opposed to an individual or private party. Public ownership specifically refers to industries selling goods and services to consumers and differs from public goods and government services financed out of a government's general budget. Public ownership can take place at the national, regional, local, or municipal levels of government; or can refer to non-governmental public ownership vested in autonomous public enterprises. Public ownership is one of the three major forms of property ownership, differentiated from private and collective/cooperative.

In market-based economies, state-owned assets are often managed and operated as joint-stock corporations with a government owning all or a controlling stake of the company's shares. This form is often referred to as a state-owned enterprise. A state-owned enterprise might variously operate as a Nonprofit corporation, as it may not be required to generate a profit; as a commercial enterprise in competitive sectors; or as a natural monopoly. Governments may also use the profitable entities they own to support the general budget. The creation of a state-owned enterprise from other forms of public property is called corporatization.

In Soviet-type economies, state property was the dominant form of industry as property. The state held a monopoly on land and natural resources, and enterprises operated under the legal framework of a nominally planned economy, and thus according to different criteria than enterprises in market and mixed economies. Nationalization is a process of transferring private or municipal assets to a central government or state entity. Municipalization is the process of transferring private or state assets to a municipal government.

== State-owned enterprise ==
A state-owned enterprise is a commercial enterprise owned by a government entity in a capitalist market or mixed economy. Reasons for state ownership of commercial enterprises are that the enterprise in question is a natural monopoly or because the government is promoting economic development and industrialization. State-owned enterprises may or may not be expected to operate in a broadly commercial manner and may or may not have monopolies in their areas of activity. The transformation of public entities and government agencies into government-owned corporations is sometimes a precursor to privatization. State capitalist economies are capitalist market economies that have high degrees of government-owned businesses.

== Relation to socialism ==
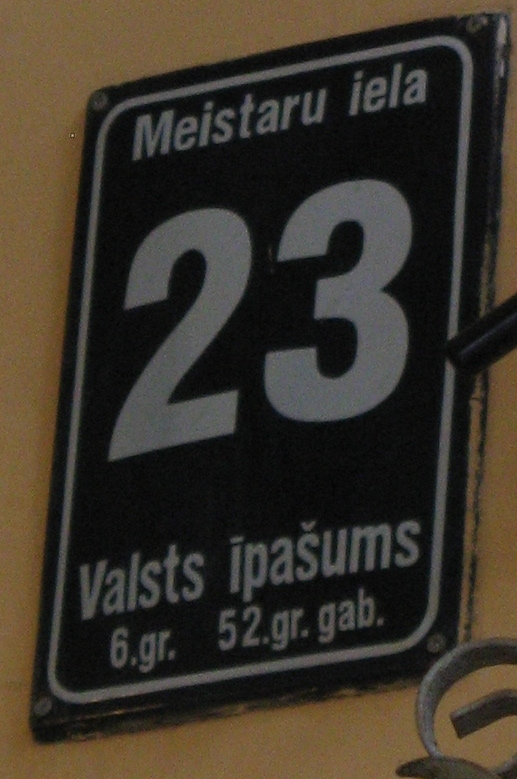
A house number plaque marking state property in Riga, Latvia

Public ownership of the means of production is a subset of social ownership, which is the defining characteristic of a socialist economy. However, state ownership and nationalization by themselves are not socialist, as they can exist under a wide variety of different political and economic systems for a variety of different reasons. State ownership by itself does not imply social ownership where income rights belong to society as a whole. As such, state ownership is only one possible expression of public ownership, which itself is one variation of the broader concept of social ownership.

In the context of socialism, public ownership implies that the surplus product generated by publicly owned assets accrues to all of society in the form of a social dividend, as opposed to a distinct class of private capital owners. There is a wide variety of organizational forms for state-run industry, ranging from specialized technocratic management to direct workers' self-management. In traditional conceptions of non-market socialism, public ownership is a tool to consolidate the means of production as a precursor to the establishment of economic planning for the allocation of resources between organizations, as required by government or by the state.

State ownership is advocated as a form of social ownership for practical concerns, with the state being seen as the obvious candidate for owning and operating the means of production. Proponents assume that the state, as the representative of the public interest, would manage resources and production for the benefit of the public. As a form of social ownership, state ownership may be contrasted with cooperatives and common ownership. Socialist theories and political ideologies that favor state ownership of the means of production may be labelled state socialism.

State ownership was recognized by Friedrich Engels in Socialism: Utopian and Scientific as, by itself, not doing away with capitalism, including the process of capital accumulation and structure of wage labor. Engels argued that state ownership of commercial industry would represent the final stage of capitalism, consisting of ownership and management of large-scale production and manufacture by the state. Within the United Kingdom, public ownership is mostly associated with the Labour Party (a centre-left democratic socialist party), specifically due to the creation of Clause IV of the "Labour Party Manifesto" in 1918. "Clause IV" was written by Fabian Society member Sidney Webb.

== Public property ==
There is a distinction to be made between state ownership and public property. The former may refer to assets operated by a specific state institution or branch of government, used exclusively by that branch, such as a research laboratory. The latter refers to assets and resources owned by the population of a state which are mostly available to the entire public for use, such as a public park (see public space).

== Criticism ==
In neoclassical economic theory, the desirability of state ownership has been studied using contract theory. According to the property rights approach based on incomplete contracting (developed by Oliver Hart and his co-authors), ownership matters because it determines what happens in contingencies that were not considered in prevailing contracts.

According to Hart, Shleifer and Vishny (1997), private ownership results in strong incentives to reduce costs, but it may also lead to poor quality. Hence, depending on the available investment technologies, there are situations in which state ownership is better. In the Hart-Shleifer-Vishny model, it is assumed that all parties have the same information, while Schmitz (2023) has studied an extension of their analysis allowing for asymmetric information. Moreover, the Hart-Shleifer-Vishny model assumes that the private party derives no utility from provision of the public good. Besley and Ghatak (2001) have shown that if the private party (a non-governmental organization) cares about the public good, then the party with the larger valuation of the public good should always be the owner, regardless of the parties' investment technologies. In the 2010s, some authors showed that the investment technology also matters in the Besley-Ghatak framework if an investing party is indispensable, or if there are bargaining frictions between the government and the private party.

== See also ==
- Common ownership
- List of government-owned companies
- Municipalization
- Nationalization
- Private property
- Property rights (economics)
- Public good
- Public sector
- Public finance
- Public property
- Social ownership
- State-owned enterprise
