= Microeconomics =

Behavior of individuals and firms

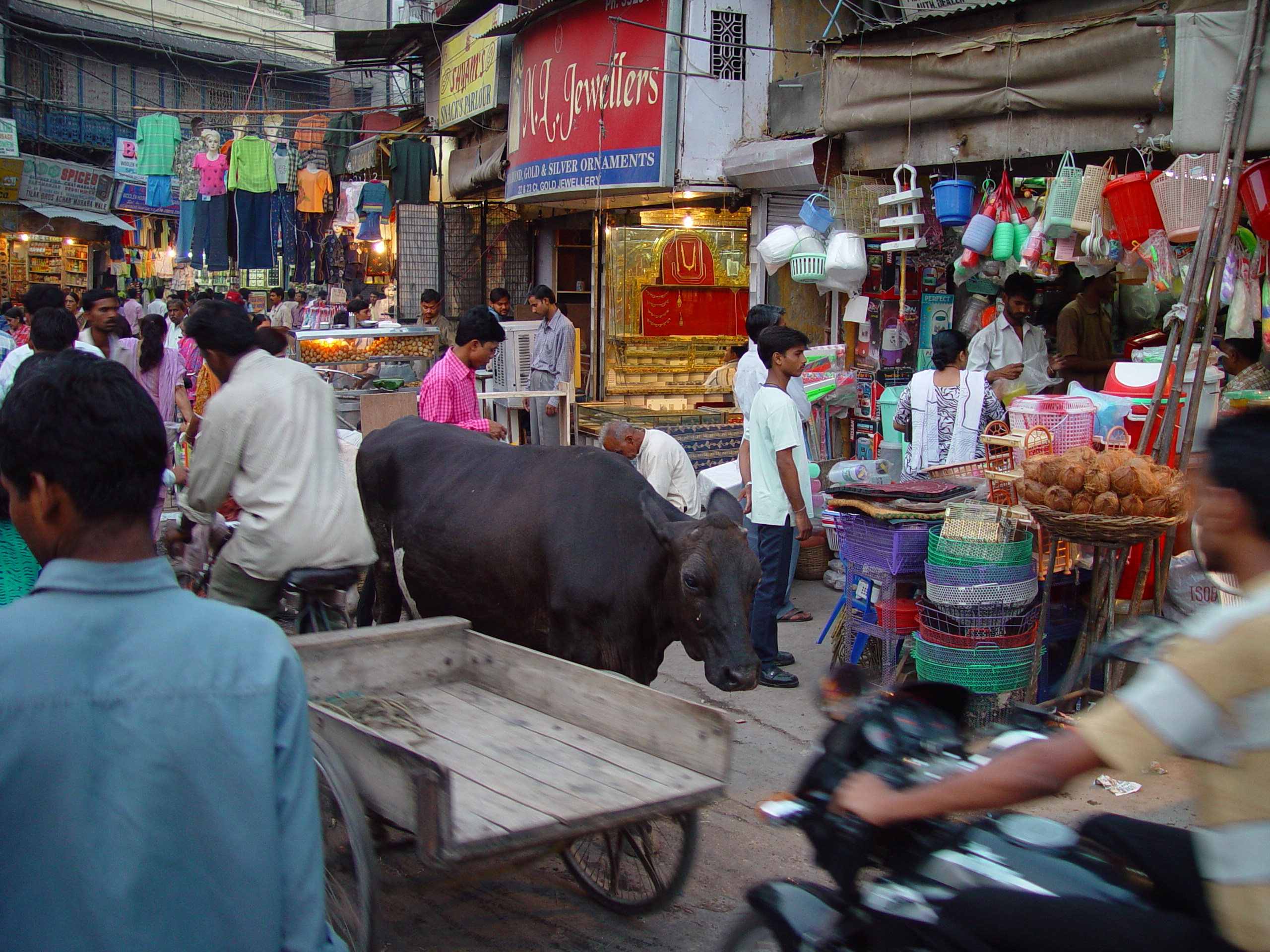
Microeconomics analyzes the market mechanisms that enable buyers and sellers to establish relative prices among goods and services. Shown is a marketplace in Delhi.

Microeconomics is a branch of economics that studies the behavior of individuals and firms in making decisions regarding the allocation of scarce resources and the interactions among these individuals and firms. Microeconomics focuses on the study of individual markets, sectors, or industries as opposed to the economy as a whole, which is studied in macroeconomics.

One goal of microeconomics is to analyze the market mechanisms that establish relative prices among goods and services and allocate limited resources among alternative uses. Microeconomics shows conditions under which free markets lead to desirable allocations. It also analyzes market failure, in which markets fail to produce efficient outcomes.

While microeconomics focuses on firms and individuals, macroeconomics focuses on the overall level of economic activity, addressing issues of growth, inflation, and unemployment—and national policies related to these issues. Microeconomics also deals with the effects of economic policies (such as changing taxation levels) on microeconomic behavior and thus on the aforementioned aspects of the economy. Particularly in the wake of the Lucas critique, much of modern macroeconomic theory has been built upon microfoundations—i.e., based upon basic assumptions about micro-level behavior.

== Assumptions and definitions ==
Microeconomic study historically has been performed according to general equilibrium theory, developed by Léon Walras in Elements of Pure Economics (1874) and partial equilibrium theory, introduced by Alfred Marshall in Principles of Economics (1890).

Microeconomic theory typically begins with the study of a single rational and utility maximizing individual. To economists, rationality means an individual possesses stable preferences that are both complete and transitive.

The technical assumption that preference relations are continuous is needed to ensure the existence of a utility function. Although microeconomic theory can continue without this assumption, it would make comparative statics impossible since there is no guarantee that the resulting utility function would be differentiable.

Microeconomic theory progresses by defining a competitive budget set, which is a subset of the consumption set. It is at this point that economists make the technical assumption that preferences are locally non-satiated. Without the assumption of LNS (local non-satiation), there is no 100% guarantee, but there would be a rational increase in individual utility. With the necessary tools and assumptions in place, the utility maximization problem (UMP) is developed.

The utility maximization problem is the heart of consumer theory. The utility maximization problem attempts to explain the action axiom by imposing rationality axioms on consumer preferences and then mathematically modeling and analyzing the consequences. The utility maximization problem serves not only as the mathematical foundation of consumer theory but as a metaphysical explanation of it as well. That is, the utility maximization problem is used by economists not only to explain what or how individuals make choices, but also why they do so.

The utility maximization problem is a constrained optimization problem in which an individual seeks to maximize utility subject to a budget constraint. Economists use the extreme value theorem to guarantee that a solution to the utility maximization problem exists. That is, since the budget constraint is both bounded and closed, a solution to the utility maximization problem exists. Economists call the solution to the utility maximization problem a Walrasian demand function or correspondence.

The utility maximization problem has so far been developed by taking consumer tastes (i.e., consumer utility) as primitive. However, an alternative way to develop microeconomic theory is by taking consumer choice as primitive. This model of microeconomic theory is referred to as revealed preference theory.

The supply and demand model describes how prices vary as a result of a balance between product availability at each price (supply) and the desires of those with purchasing power at each price (demand). The graph depicts a right-shift in demand from D_{1} to D_{2} along with the consequent increase in price and quantity required to reach a new market-clearing equilibrium point on the supply curve (S).

The theory of supply and demand usually assumes that markets are perfectly competitive. This implies that there are many buyers and sellers in the market, and none of them has the capacity to influence the prices of goods and services significantly. In many real-life transactions, the assumption fails because some individual buyers or sellers can influence prices. Quite often, a sophisticated analysis is required to understand the demand-supply equation of a good model. However, the theory works well in situations meeting these assumptions.

Mainstream economics does not assume a priori that markets are preferable to other forms of social organization. In fact, much analysis is devoted to cases where market failure leads to resource allocation that is suboptimal and creates deadweight loss. A classic example of suboptimal resource allocation is that of a public good. In such cases, economists may attempt to find policies that avoid waste, either directly by government control, indirectly by regulation that induces market participants to act in a manner consistent with optimal welfare, or by creating "missing markets" to enable efficient trading where none had previously existed.

This is studied in the field of collective action and public choice theory. "Optimal welfare" usually takes on a Paretian norm, which is a mathematical application of the Kaldor–Hicks method. This can diverge from the Utilitarian goal of maximizing utility because it does not consider how goods are distributed among people. Market failure in positive economics (microeconomics) has limited implications when the economist's beliefs are not mixed with their theory.

The demand for various commodities by individuals is generally thought of as the outcome of a utility-maximizing process, with each individual seeking to maximize their own utility subject to a budget constraint and a given consumption set.

=== Allocation of scarce resources ===
Individuals and firms need to allocate limited resources to ensure all agents in the economy are well off. Firms decide which goods and services to produce, considering low costs involving labour, materials, and capital as well as potential profit margins. Consumers choose the goods and services they want that will maximize their happiness, taking into account their limited wealth.

The government can make these allocation decisions, or consumers and firms can make them independently. For example, in the former Soviet Union, the government played a role in informing car manufacturers which cars to produce and which consumers would gain access to them.

== History ==
Economists commonly consider themselves microeconomists or macroeconomists. The difference between microeconomics and macroeconomics was likely introduced in 1933 by the Norwegian economist Ragnar Frisch, the co-recipient of the first Nobel Memorial Prize in Economic Sciences in 1969. However, Frisch did not actually use the word "microeconomics", instead drawing distinctions between "micro-dynamic" and "macro-dynamic" analysis in a way similar to how the words "microeconomics" and "macroeconomics" are used today. The first known use of the term "microeconomics" in a published article was from Pieter de Wolff in 1941, who broadened the term "micro-dynamics" into "microeconomics".

== Microeconomic theory ==
=== Consumer demand theory ===
Consumer demand theory relates preferences for the consumption of both goods and services to the consumption expenditures; ultimately, this relationship between preferences and consumption expenditures is used to relate preferences to consumer demand curves. The link between personal preferences, consumption, and the demand curve is one of the most closely studied relations in economics. It is a way of analyzing how consumers may achieve equilibrium between preferences and expenditures by maximizing utility subject to consumer budget constraints.

=== Production theory ===
Production theory is the study of production, or the economic process of converting inputs into outputs. Production uses resources to create a good or service that is suitable for use, gift-giving in a gift economy, or exchange in a market economy. This can include manufacturing, storing, shipping, and packaging. Some economists define production broadly as all economic activity other than consumption. They see every commercial activity other than the final purchase as some form of production.

=== Cost-of-production theory of value ===
The cost-of-production theory of value states that the price of an object or condition is determined by the sum of the cost of the resources that went into making it. The cost can comprise any of the factors of production (including labor, capital, or land) and taxation. Technology can be viewed either as a form of fixed capital (e.g. an industrial plant) or circulating capital (e.g. intermediate goods).

In the mathematical model for the cost of production, the short-run total cost is equal to fixed cost plus total variable cost. The fixed cost is the cost incurred regardless of how much the firm produces. The variable cost is a function of the quantity of an object being produced. The cost function can be used to characterize production through the duality theory in economics, developed mainly by Ronald Shephard (1953, 1970) and other scholars (Sickles & Zelenyuk, 2019, ch. 2).

=== Fixed and variable costs ===
- Fixed cost (FC) – This cost does not change with output. It includes business expenses such as rent, salaries, and utility bills.
- Variable cost (VC) – This cost changes as output changes. This includes raw materials, delivery costs, and production supplies.

Over a short period (a few months), most costs are fixed, as the firm must pay salaries, contracted shipments, and materials used to produce various goods. Over a longer time period (2-3 years), costs can become variable. Firms can decide to reduce output, purchase fewer materials, and even sell some machinery. Over 10 years, most costs become variable as workers can be laid off or new machinery can be bought to replace the old machinery

Sunk costs – This is a fixed cost that has already been incurred and cannot be recovered. An example of this can be seen in R&D, such as in the pharmaceutical industry. Hundreds of millions of dollars are spent to achieve new drug breakthroughs, but this is challenging as it's increasingly harder to find breakthroughs and meet tighter regulatory standards. Thus, many projects are written off, leading to losses of millions of dollars

=== Opportunity cost ===
Opportunity cost is closely related to the idea of time constraints. One can do only one thing at a time, which means that, inevitably, one is always giving up other things. The opportunity cost of any activity is the value of the next-best alternative one could have pursued instead. Opportunity cost depends only on the value of the next-best alternative. It does not matter whether one has five alternatives or 5,000.

Opportunity costs can tell when not to do something as well as when to do something. For example, one may like waffles, but like chocolate even more. If someone offers only waffles, one would take them. But if offered waffles or chocolate, one would take the chocolate. The opportunity cost of eating waffles is sacrificing the chance to eat chocolate. Because the cost of not eating the chocolate is higher than the benefits of eating the waffles, it makes no sense to choose waffles. Of course, if one chooses chocolate, they still face the opportunity cost of giving up waffles. But one is willing to do that because the waffle's opportunity cost is lower than the chocolate's benefits. Opportunity costs are unavoidable constraints on behavior because one has to decide what's best and give up the next-best alternative.

=== Price theory ===
Microeconomics is also known as price theory to highlight the significance of prices for buyers and sellers, who determine them through their individual actions. Price theory is a field of economics that uses the supply and demand framework to explain and predict human behavior. It is associated with the Chicago School of Economics. Price theory studies competitive equilibrium in markets to yield testable hypotheses that can be rejected.

Price theory is not the same as microeconomics. Strategic behavior, such as interactions among sellers in a market with few sellers, is a significant part of microeconomics but is not emphasized in price theory. Price theorists focus on competition, believing it to be a reasonable description of most markets that leaves room to study additional aspects of tastes and technology. As a result, price theory tends to use less game theory than microeconomics does.

Price theory focuses on how agents respond to prices. Still, its framework can be applied to a wide variety of socioeconomic issues that might not seem to involve prices at first glance. Price theorists have influenced several other fields, including the development of public choice theory and law and economics. Price theory has been applied to issues previously thought of as outside the purview of economics, such as criminal justice, marriage, and addiction.

== Microeconomic models ==
=== Supply and demand ===
Supply and demand is an economic model of price determination in a perfectly competitive market. It concludes that in a perfectly competitive market with no externalities, per unit taxes, or price controls, the unit price for a particular good is the price at which the quantity demanded by consumers equals the quantity supplied by producers. This price results in a stable economic equilibrium.

The supply and demand model describes how prices vary as a result of a balance between product availability and demand. The graph depicts an increase (that is, right-shift) in demand from D_{1} to D_{2} along with the consequent increase in price and quantity required to reach a new equilibrium point on the supply curve (S).

Prices and quantities have been described as the most directly observable attributes of goods produced and exchanged in a market economy. The theory of supply and demand is an organizing principle for explaining how prices coordinate the amounts produced and consumed. In microeconomics, it applies to price and output determination for a market with perfect competition, which includes the condition of no buyers or sellers large enough to have price-setting power.

For a given market of a commodity, demand is the relation of the quantity that all buyers would be prepared to purchase at each unit price of the good. Demand is often represented by a table or a graph showing the relationship between price and quantity demanded (as in the figure). Demand theory describes individual consumers as rationally choosing the most preferred quantity of each good, given income, prices, tastes, etc. A term for this is "constrained utility maximization" (with income and wealth as the constraints on demand). Here, utility refers to the hypothesized relation of each consumer for ranking different commodity bundles as more or less preferred.

The law of demand states that, in general, price and quantity demanded in a given market are inversely related. That is, the higher the price of a product, the less of it people would be prepared to buy (other things unchanged). As the price of a commodity falls, consumers move toward it from relatively more expensive goods (the substitution effect). In addition, the price decline increases purchasing power, thereby increasing the ability to buy (the income effect). Other factors can change demand; for example, an increase in income will shift the demand curve for a normal good outward, as shown in the figure. All determinants are treated as constant factors in demand and supply.

Supply is the relation between the price of a good and the quantity available for sale at that price. It may be represented as a table or graph relating price and quantity supplied. Producers, for example, business firms, are hypothesized to be profit maximizers, meaning that they attempt to produce and supply the amount of goods that will bring them the highest profit. Supply is typically represented as a function relating price and quantity, if other factors are unchanged.

That is, the higher the price at which the good can be sold, the more of it producers will supply, as in the figure. The higher price makes it profitable to increase production. Just as on the demand side, the position of the supply curve can shift, say, due to a change in the price of a productive input or a technical improvement. The "Law of Supply" states that, in general, a rise in price leads to an expansion in supply and a fall in price leads to a contraction in supply. Here as well, the determinants of supply, such as the price of substitutes, the cost of production, the technology applied, and the various factors of production, are held constant for a specific period of supply evaluation.

Market equilibrium occurs where quantity supplied equals quantity demanded, the intersection of the supply and demand curves in the figure above. At a price below the equilibrium, there is a shortage of quantity supplied compared to quantity demanded. This is posited to bid up the price. At a price above equilibrium, there is a surplus of quantity supplied compared to quantity demanded. This pushes the price down. The model of supply and demand predicts that for given supply and demand curves, price and quantity will stabilize at the price that makes quantity supplied equal to quantity demanded. Similarly, demand-and-supply theory predicts a new price-quantity combination from a shift in demand (as shown in the figure) or in supply.

For a given quantity of a consumer good, the point on the demand curve indicates the value, or marginal utility, to consumers for that unit. It measures what the consumer would be prepared to pay for that unit. The corresponding point on the supply curve measures marginal cost, the increase in total cost to the supplier for the corresponding unit of the good. The equilibrium price is determined by supply and demand. In a perfectly competitive market, supply and demand equate marginal cost and marginal utility at equilibrium.

On the supply side of the market, some factors of production are described as (relatively) variable in the short run, which affects the cost of changing output levels. Their usage rates can be changed easily, such as for electrical power, raw material inputs, overtime, and temp work. Other inputs are relatively fixed, such as plant and equipment and key personnel. In the long run, all inputs may be adjusted by management. These distinctions translate into differences in the elasticity (responsiveness) of the supply curve in the short and long runs, and corresponding differences in the price-quantity changes from a shift on the supply or demand side of the market.

Marginalist theory, as above, describes consumers as attempting to reach their most-preferred positions, subject to income and wealth constraints. In contrast, producers attempt to maximize profits subject to their own constraints, including demand for the goods they produce, technology, and input prices. For the consumer, that point is where the marginal utility of a good, net of price, reaches zero, leaving no net gain from further increases in consumption. Analogously, the producer compares marginal revenue (identical to price for the perfect competitor) against the marginal cost of a good, with marginal profit the difference. At the point where marginal profit reaches zero, further increases in production of the good stop. For movement to market equilibrium and for changes in equilibrium, price and quantity also change "at the margin": more-or-less of something, rather than necessarily all-or-nothing.

Other applications of demand and supply include the distribution of income among the factors of production, including labor and capital, through factor markets. In a competitive labor market, for example, the quantity of labor employed and the price of labor (the wage rate) depend on the demand for labor (from employers for production) and supply of labor (from potential workers). Labor economics examines the interaction of workers and employers in such markets to explain patterns and changes in wages and other labor income, labor mobility, (un)employment, productivity through human capital, and related public-policy issues.

Demand-and-supply analysis is used to explain the behavior of perfectly competitive markets, but as a standard of comparison, it can be extended to any market. It can also be generalized to explain variables across the economy, for example, total output (estimated as real GDP) and the general price level, as studied in macroeconomics. Tracing the qualitative and quantitative effects of variables that change supply and demand, whether in the short or long run, is a standard exercise in applied economics. Economic theory may also specify conditions under which supply and demand in the market are an efficient mechanism for allocating resources.

== Market structure ==
Market structure refers to features of a market, including the number of firms in the market, the distribution of market shares between them, product uniformity across firms, how easy it is for firms to enter and exit the market, and forms of competition in the market. A market structure can have several types of interacting market systems.

Different forms of markets are features of capitalism and market socialism, with advocates of state socialism often criticizing markets and aiming to substitute or replace them with varying degrees of government-directed economic planning.

Competition serves as a regulatory mechanism in market systems, with the government providing regulations where the market cannot be expected to self-regulate. Regulations help mitigate negative externalities of goods and services when the market's private equilibrium does not align with the social equilibrium. One example of this is concerning building codes, which, if absent in a purely competition-regulated market system, might result in several horrific injuries or deaths before companies would begin improving structural safety, as consumers may at first not be as concerned or aware of safety issues to begin putting pressure on companies to provide them. Companies would be motivated not to provide adequate safety features because doing so would cut into their profits.

The concept of "market type" differs from that of "market structure". Nevertheless, there are a variety of types of markets.

The different market structures produce cost curves based on the type of structure present. The different curves are based on production costs; the graph shows marginal cost, average total cost, average variable cost, average fixed cost, and marginal revenue, which, in a price-taking firm, is equal to demand, average revenue, and price.

=== Perfect competition ===
Perfect competition is a situation in which numerous small firms producing identical products compete against each other in a given industry. Perfect competition leads to firms producing the socially optimal output level at the minimum possible cost per unit. Firms in perfect competition are "price takers" (they do not have enough market power to increase the price of their goods or services profitably). A good example is digital marketplaces, such as eBay, where many sellers offer similar products to many buyers. Consumers in a perfectly competitive market have perfect knowledge of the products being sold.

=== Imperfect competition ===
Imperfect competition is a type of market structure that exhibits some, but not all, features of competitive markets. In perfect competition, market power is not achievable because there are many producers, leading to intense competition. Therefore, prices are brought down to a marginal cost level. In a monopoly, market power is achieved by one firm, leading to prices being higher than the marginal cost level. Between these two types of markets are firms that are neither perfectly competitive nor monopolistic. Firms such as Pepsi, Coke, Sony, Nintendo, and Microsoft dominate the cola and video game industries, respectively. These firms are in imperfect competition

=== Monopolistic competition ===
Monopolistic competition is a situation in which many firms with slightly different products compete. Production costs are higher than those of perfectly competitive firms, but society benefits from product differentiation. Examples of industries with market structures similar to monopolistic competition include restaurants, cereal, clothing, shoes, and service industries in large cities.

=== Monopoly ===
A monopoly is a market structure in which a single supplier dominates a market or industry for a particular good or service. Because monopolies have no competition, they tend to charge higher prices and produce below the socially optimal output level. However, not all monopolies are bad, especially in industries where multiple firms would entail more costs than benefits (i.e., natural monopolies).

- Natural monopoly: A monopoly in an industry where one producer can produce output at a lower cost than many small producers.

=== Oligopoly ===
An oligopoly is a market structure in which a market or industry is dominated by a small number of firms (oligopolists). Oligopolies can create incentives for firms to engage in collusion and form cartels, reducing competition, leading to higher prices for consumers and lower overall market output. Alternatively, oligopolies can be fiercely competitive and engage in flamboyant advertising campaigns.

- Duopoly: A special case of an oligopoly, with only two firms. Game theory can elucidate behavior in duopolies and oligopolies.

=== Monopsony ===
A monopsony is a market with only one buyer and many sellers. A classic theoretical example is a mining town, where the company that owns the mine is able to set wages low since they face no competition from other employers in hiring workers, because they are the only employer in the town, and geographic isolation or obstacles prevent workers from seeking employment in other locations. Other more current examples may include school districts where teachers have little mobility across districts. In such cases the district faces little competition from other schools in hiring teachers, giving the district increased power when negotiating employment terms.

=== Bilateral monopoly ===
A bilateral monopoly is a market consisting of both a monopoly (a single seller) and a monopsony (a single buyer).

=== Oligopsony ===
An oligopsony is a market with a few buyers and many sellers.

== Game theory ==
Game theory is a major method used in mathematical economics and business for modeling competing behaviors of interacting agents. The term "game" here refers to the study of strategic interactions among people. Applications include a wide array of economic phenomena and approaches, such as auctions, bargaining, mergers & acquisitions pricing, fair division, duopolies, oligopolies, social network formation, agent-based computational economics, general equilibrium, mechanism design, and voting systems, and across such broad areas as experimental economics, behavioral economics, information economics, industrial organization, and political economy.

== Information economics ==
Information economics is a branch of microeconomic theory that studies how information and information systems affect an economy and economic decisions. Information has special characteristics. It is easy to create but hard to trust. It is easy to spread but hard to control. It influences many decisions. These special characteristics (as compared with other types of goods) complicate many standard economic theories. The economics of information has recently become of great interest to many - possibly due to the rise of information-based companies inside the technology industry. From a game theory approach, the usual constraints that agents have complete information can be loosened to examine further the consequences of having incomplete information. This yields many results applicable to real-life situations. For example, if one relaxes this assumption, one can scrutinize agents' actions in situations of uncertainty. It is also possible to better understand the impacts – both positive and negative – of agents seeking or acquiring information.

== Applied ==
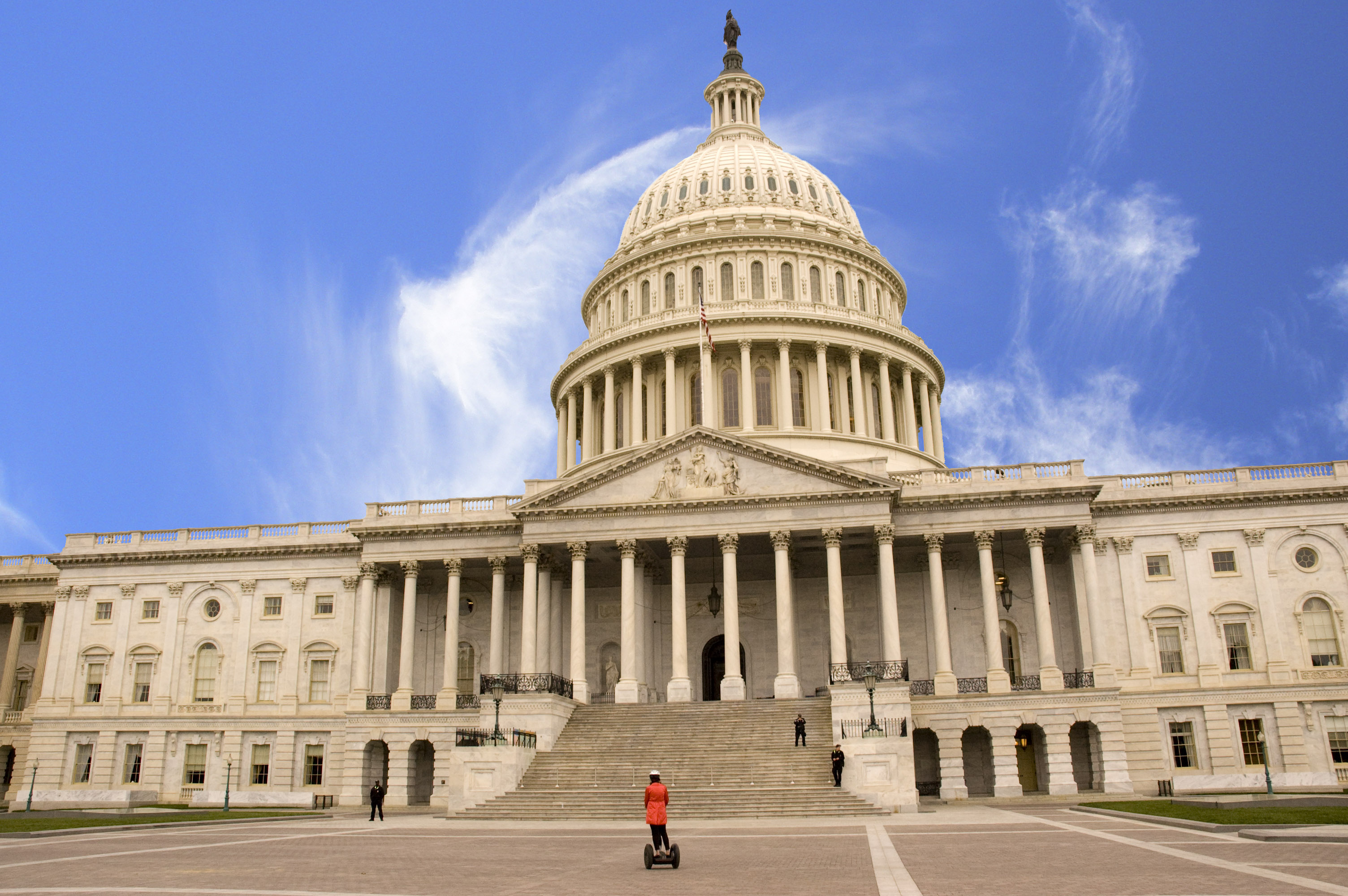
United States Capitol Building: meeting place of the United States Congress, where many tax laws are passed, which directly impact economic welfare. This is studied in the subject of public economics.

Applied microeconomics includes a range of specialized areas of study, many of which draw on methods from other fields.

- Economic history examines the evolution of the economy and economic institutions, using methods and techniques from the fields of economics, history, geography, sociology, psychology, and political science.
- Education economics examines the organization of education provision and its implications for efficiency and equity, including the effects of education on productivity.
- Financial economics examines topics such as the structure of optimal portfolios, the rate of return to capital, econometric analysis of security returns, and corporate financial behavior.
- Health economics examines the organization of health care systems, including the role of the health care workforce and health insurance programs.
- Industrial organization examines topics such as the entry and exit of firms, innovation, and the role of trademarks.
- Law and economics applies microeconomic principles to the selection and enforcement of competing legal regimes and their relative efficiencies.
- Political economy examines the role of political institutions in determining policy outcomes.
- Public economics examines the design of government tax and expenditure policies and economic effects of these policies (e.g., social insurance programs).
- Urban economics, which examines the challenges faced by cities, such as sprawl, air and water pollution, traffic congestion, and poverty, draws on the fields of urban geography and sociology.
- Labor economics examines primarily labor markets, but comprises a large range of public policy issues such as immigration, minimum wages, and inequality.

== See also ==
- Macroeconomics
- First-order approach
- Critique of political economy
