= Complete contract =

A complete contract is an important concept from contract theory. If the parties to an agreement could specify their respective rights and duties for every possible future state of the world, their contract would be complete. There would be no gaps in the terms of the contract.

However, because it would be prohibitively expensive to write a complete contract, contracts in the real world are usually incomplete. When a dispute arises and the case falls into a gap in the contract, either the parties must engage in bargaining or the courts must step in and fill in the gap. The idea of a complete contract is closely related to the notion of default rules, e.g. legal rules that will fill the gap in a contract in the absence of an agreed upon provision.

In economics, the field of contract theory can be subdivided into the theory of complete contracts and the theory of incomplete contracts. Complete contracting theory is also called agency theory (or principal-agent theory) and closely related to (Bayesian) mechanism design and implementation theory. The two most important classes of models in complete contracting theory are adverse selection and moral hazard models. In this part of contract theory, every conceivable contractual arrangement between the contractual parties is allowed, provided it is feasible given the relevant technological and information constraints. In the presence of asymmetric information, the optimization problems can be handled due to the revelation principle. A leading textbook exposition of complete contract theory is Laffont and Martimort (2002).

In contrast, incomplete contracting models consider situations in which only a restricted class of contracts is allowed, e.g. only simple ownership structures can be contractually specified in the Grossman-Hart-Moore theory of the firm.
