= Participation constraint =

Participation constraint may refer to:

- Participation constraint on an entity-relationship model in software engineering
- Participation constraint (mechanism design) in economics
