= Incomplete contracts =

Term in law and economics

In contract law, an incomplete contract is one that is defective or uncertain in a material respect. In economic theory, an incomplete contract (as opposed to a complete contract) is one that does not provide for the rights, obligations and remedies of the parties in every possible state of the world.

Since the human mind is a scarce resource and the mind cannot collect, process, and understand an infinite amount of information, economic actors are limited in their rationality (the limitations of the human mind in understanding and solving complex problems) and one cannot anticipate all possible contingencies. Or perhaps because it is too expensive to write a complete contract, the parties will opt for a "sufficiently complete" contract. In short, in practice, every contract is incomplete for a variety of reasons and limitations. The incompleteness of a contract also means that the protection it provides may be inadequate. Even if a contract is incomplete, the legal validity of the contract cannot be denied, and an incomplete contract does not mean that it is unenforceable. The terms and provisions of the contract still have influence and are binding on the parties to the contract. As for contractual incompleteness, the law is concerned with when and how a court should fill gaps in a contract when they are too many or too uncertain to be enforceable, and when it is obliged to negotiate to make an incomplete contract fully complete or to achieve the desired final contract.

The incomplete contracting paradigm was pioneered by Sanford J. Grossman, Oliver D. Hart, and John H. Moore. In their seminal contributions, Grossman and Hart (1986), Hart and Moore (1990), and Hart (1995) argue that in practice, contracts cannot specify what is to be done in every possible contingency. At the time of contracting, future contingencies may not even be describable. Moreover, parties cannot commit themselves never to engage in mutually beneficial renegotiation later on in their relationship. Thus, an immediate consequence of the incomplete contracting approach is the so-called hold-up problem. Since at least in some states of the world the parties will renegotiate their contractual arrangements later on, they have insufficient incentives to make relationship-specific investments (since a party's investment returns will partially go to the other party in the renegotiations). Oliver Hart and his co-authors argue that the hold-up problem may be mitigated by choosing a suitable ownership structure ex-ante (according to the incomplete contracting paradigm, more complex contractual arrangements are ruled out). Hence, the property rights approach to the theory of the firm can explain the pros and cons of vertical integration, thus providing a formal answer to important questions regarding the boundaries of the firm that were first raised by Ronald Coase (1937).

The incomplete contracting approach has been subject of a still ongoing discussion in contract theory. In particular, some authors such as Maskin and Tirole (1999) argue that rational parties should be able to solve the hold-up problem with complex contracts, while Hart and Moore (1999) point out that these contractual solutions do not work if renegotiation cannot be ruled out. Some authors have argued that the pros and cons of vertical integration can sometimes also be explained in complete contracting models. The property rights approach based on incomplete contracting has been criticized by Williamson (2000) because it is focused on ex-ante investment incentives, while it neglects ex-post inefficiencies. It has been pointed out by Schmitz (2006) that the property rights approach can be extended to the case of asymmetric information, which may explain ex-post inefficiencies. The property rights approach has also been extended by Chiu (1998) and DeMeza and Lockwood (1998), who allow for different ways to model the renegotiations. In a more recent extension, Hart and Moore (2008) have argued that contracts may serve as reference points. The theory of incomplete contracts has been successfully applied in various contexts, including privatization, international trade, management of research & development, allocation of formal and real authority, advocacy, and many others.

The 2016 Nobel Prize in Economics was awarded to Oliver D. Hart and Bengt Holmström for their contribution to contract theory, including incomplete contracts.

== In economic theory ==
In 1986, Grossman and Hart (1986) used incomplete contract theory in their seminal paper on the costs and benefits of vertical integration to answer the question "What is a firm and what determines its boundaries?". The Grossman-Hart theory of property rights is the first to explain in a straightforward manner why markets are so important in the context of organizational choice. The advantage of non-integrated markets is that the owners (entrepreneurs) can exercise their control, while the advantage of market transactions also stems from the power of restraint conferred by ownership. The fact that economic actors are only finitely rational and cannot foresee all possible contingencies is perhaps at the heart of the problem. However, as this uncertain state of nature or behavior cannot be written into an enforceable contract, when the contract is incomplete, not all uses of the asset can be specified in advance and any contract negotiated in advance must leave some discretion as to the use of the asset, with the 'owner' of the company being the party to whom residual control is allocated at the contract stage. Grossman and Hart claim that the essence of the firm lies in the decision-making power conferred by the ownership of its assets. In a world of incomplete contracts, decision-making power plays a key role in determining the incentives of owners. Grossman and Hart believe that the optimal allocation or governance structure of property rights is the allocation that minimizes efficiency losses. Therefore, where Party A's investment is more important than Party B's, it is preferable to allocate title to the asset to Party A, even if this discourages Party B's investment. Incomplete contractual/property rights approach gives rise to theories of ownership and vertical integration, and it also directly addresses the question of what constitutes a firm. Both Grossman and Hart consider the firm to be a collection of assets over which the owners have residual control.

In 1990, Oliver Hart and John Moore published another article, "Property Rights and the Nature of the Firm", which provided a framework for addressing when transactions should take place within the firm and when they should take place through the market. The essence of the 1986 Grossman-Hart model is about the optimal allocation of the constraining forces conferred by ownership, and its model of property rights is about the allocation of assets between individuals (entrepreneurs) rather than firms. Whereas the Hart-Moore model of 1990 extends this optimal allocation of traction, property rights theory clarifies the content of the allocation assumptions between firms and identifies a firm with the assets that its owners control. One of Hart-Moore's key findings suggests an explanation for why firms, rather than workers, tend to own most of the non-human assets used to produce goods and services: complementary assets should be owned by one person.

=== New ideas ===
Incomplete contracts can create scenarios that lead to inefficient investments and market failures, but incompleteness is essentially a feasibility constraint. The 'strategic ambiguity hypothesis' assumes that the optimal formal contract may be deliberately incomplete. Companies use strategic ambiguity to circumvent legal constraints. Invalidate these agreements and make the law insufficient to prevent their formation and performance.

== Limitations ==
Contracts have many restrictions in terms. Incomplete contracts are also limited by them. Contractual terms are the specific details of an agreement, including the rights and obligations of the parties. Contractual terms are broadly divided into two types, express terms and implied terms. Express terms are included in the signed contract, or a caveat that is reasonably noticeable to the other party. Implicit terms include those implied by the court and any relevant legal provisions.

=== Terms implied by the Court ===
Courts are often willing to imply a term in a settled contract to "fill in the gaps" as long as it is:

- Reasonable and fair;
- Necessary to make the contract workable;
- So obvious as to be "self-explanatory";
- Able to be expressed clearly and in line with clear terms.

Example:

- The court will imply into the contract terms which the parties are deemed to have known by virtue of the previous transaction.

=== Statutory implied terms ===
Example：

ACL's (Australian Consumer Law) implied terms in consumer contracts are intended to protect the buyer, and there is an implied term in every contract for the sale of goods. Conditions of ownership by the seller, implies the right to sell these goods to the buyer:

- Provided that the goods will be as described.
- Provided that the goods will be of merchantable quality.
- Provided that the goods are fit for their purpose.
- Provided that most of the goods will correspond to the sample.

=== Unenforceable terms ===
1. If one of the parties to the contract is a minor or a person lacking mental capacity, that party will not have the legal capacity to contract. Only if both contract parties have the legal capacity to sign a contract, contracts are only enforceable.
2. Some contracts are classified by common law as illegal and unenforceable:

——Criminal or tortious contracts

——Contracts to promote corruption in public office

——Contracts intended to avoid paying taxes

——Contracts to prevent or delay the administration of justice

The effect of a breach of a statutory provision on the validity and enforceability of a contract depends on the wording of the regulation itself. An agreement may just be illegal because it violates a statutory prohibition.

== See also ==
- Precommitment
