= Edward J. Green =

American economist (1948–2019)

Edward James Green (March 31, 1948 – October 26, 2019) was an American economist best known for his contributions to the theory of dynamic contracts. Green received his Ph.D. from Carnegie Mellon University in 1977. His dissertation won him the Alexander Henderson Award for excellence in economics. He taught at Princeton University and worked at the Federal Reserve Bank of Minneapolis, and the Federal Reserve Bank of Chicago, and was a professor of economics at Pennsylvania State University.

In a 1984 article written with Robert Porter published in Econometrica, Green and Porter showed that price wars can periodically occur even among firms that are colluding optimally.

In a 1987 contribution ("Lending and the Smoothing of Uninsurable Income"), he studied the optimal consumption allocation that a planner would choose if he could not observe households' income, and that income was uncertain to households. The planner faces a trade-off between insuring and enticing the households to reveal if they have had high or low income. Green showed that the allocation was related to Milton Friedman's permanent income theory. This contribution is one of the earliest in the economic field of dynamic contracts.

Green died from cancer at Mount Nittany Medical Center in State College, Pennsylvania on October 26, 2019, at age 71.
