= Budget set =

All bundles a consumer can afford based on various conditions

In economics, a budget set, or the opportunity set facing a consumer, is the set of all possible consumption bundles that the consumer can afford taking as given the prices of commodities available to the consumer and the consumer's income. Let the number of commodities available to the consumer in an economy be finite and equal to $k$. Thus, for commodity amounts $\mathbf{x} = \left[ x_{1}, x_{2}, \ldots, x_{k} \right]$, also known as consumption plans which should not exceed the income, with associated prices $\mathbf{p} = \left[ p_{1}, p_{2}, \ldots, p_{k} \right]$ and consumer income $m$, the budget set is defined as

$$B_{\mathbf{p}, m} = \left\{ \mathbf{x} \in X : \mathbf{p} \mathbf{x} \leq m \right\}$$,

where the consumption set is taken to be $X = \mathbb{R}^{k}_{+}$. It is typically assumed that $\mathbf{p} \gg 0$ and $m \in \mathbb{R}_{+}$, in which case $B$ is also known as the Walrasian, or competitive, budget set.

The budget set is bounded above by a $k$-dimensional budget hyperplane characterized by the equation $\mathbf{p} \mathbf{x} = m$, which in the two-good case corresponds to the budget line. Graphically, the budget set is the subset of $\mathbb{R}^{k}_{+}$ that contains all the consumption bundles that lie on or below the budget hyperplane.

Given the framework described above, Walrasian budget sets are convex and compact.

Other sources of wealth, including stocks, savings, pensions, profit shares, etc., are not included in the income described above. The income described above are also known as initial wealth.

The demand set $\phi(p,m)$ is the set that the consumer chooses to go with based on the preferences from the budget set.
