= Moral hazard =

Increases in the exposure to risk when insured, or when another bears the cost

In economics, a moral hazard is a situation where an economic actor has an incentive to increase its exposure to risk because it will not bear the full costs associated with that risk. For example, when a corporation is insured, it may take on higher risk knowing that its insurance will pay the associated costs. A moral hazard may occur where the actions of the risk-taking party change to the detriment of the cost-bearing party after a financial transaction has taken place.

Moral hazard can occur under a type of information asymmetry where the risk-taking party to a transaction knows more about its intentions than the party paying the consequences of the risk and has a tendency or incentive to take on too much risk from the perspective of the party with less information. One example is a principal–agent approach (also called agency theory), where one party, called an agent, acts on behalf of another party, called the principal. However, a principal–agent problem can occur when there is a conflict of interest between the agent and principal. If the agent has more information about their actions or intentions than the principal then the agent may have an incentive to act too riskily (from the viewpoint of the principal) if the interests of the agent and the principal are not aligned.

== History ==
According to research by Dembe and Boden, the term dates back to the 17th century and was widely used by English insurance companies by the late 19th century. Early usage of the term carried negative connotations, implying fraud or immoral behavior (usually on the part of an insured party). Dembe and Boden point out, however, that prominent mathematicians who studied decision-making in the 18th century used "moral" to mean "subjective", which may cloud the true ethical significance in the term. The concept of moral hazard was the subject of renewed study by economists in the 1960s, beginning with economist Ken Arrow, and did not imply immoral behavior or fraud. Economists use this term to describe inefficiencies that can occur when risks are displaced or cannot be fully evaluated, rather than a description of the ethics or morals of the involved parties.

Rowell and Connelly offer a detailed description of the genesis of the term moral hazard, by identifying salient changes in economic thought, which are identified within the medieval theological and probability literature. Due to the different approaches taken by economics and philosophy in interpreting the concept of "moral hazard", there are significant differences in their understanding of its underlying causes. In economics, "moral hazard" is often attributed to the malignant development of utilitarianism. In contrast, philosophy and ethics view "moral hazard" from a broader perspective that includes the moral behavior of individuals and society as a whole. The root cause of "moral hazard" is due to the immoral behavior of economic agents from a social perspective. Their paper also compares and contrasts the predominantly normative conception of moral hazard found within the insurance-industry literature with the largely positive interpretations found within the economic literature. Often what is described as "moral hazard[s]" in the insurance literature is upon closer reading, a description of the closely related concept, adverse selection.

== Finance ==
In 1998, William J. McDonough, head of the New York Federal Reserve, helped the counterparties of Long-Term Capital Management avoid losses by taking over the firm. This move was criticized by former Fed Chair Paul Volcker and others as increasing moral hazard. Tyler Cowen concludes that "creditors came to believe that their loans to unsound financial institutions would be made good by the Fed – as long as the collapse of those institutions would threaten the global credit system". Fed Chair, Alan Greenspan, while conceding the risk of moral hazard, defended the policy to orderly unwind Long-Term Capital by saying the world economy is at stake. Greenspan had himself been accused of creating wider moral hazard in markets by using the Greenspan put.

Economist Paul Krugman described moral hazard as "any situation in which one person makes the decision about how much risk to take, while someone else bears the cost if things go badly". Financial bailouts of lending institutions by governments, central banks or other institutions can encourage risky lending in the future if those that take the risks come to believe that they will not have to carry the full burden of potential losses. Lending institutions need to take risks by making loans, and the riskiest loans usually have the potential for making the highest return.

Taxpayers, depositors and other creditors often have to shoulder at least part of the burden of risky financial decisions made by lending institutions.

Many have argued that certain types of mortgage securitization contribute to moral hazard. Mortgage securitization enables mortgage originators to pass on the risk that the mortgages they originate might default and not hold the mortgages on their balance sheets and assume the risk. In one kind of mortgage securitization, known as "agency securitizations", default risk is retained by the securitizing agency that buys the mortgages from originators. These agencies thus have an incentive to monitor originators and check loan quality. "Agency securitizations" refer to securitizations by either Ginnie Mae, a government agency, or by Fannie Mae and Freddie Mac, both for-profit government-sponsored enterprises. They are similar to the "covered bonds" that are commonly used in Western Europe in that the securitizing agency retains default risk. Under both models, investors take on only interest-rate risk, not default risk.

In another type of securitization, known as "private label" securitization, default risk is generally not retained by the securitizing entity. Instead, the securitizing entity passes on default risk to investors. The securitizing entity, therefore, has relatively little incentive to monitor originators and maintain loan quality. "Private label" securitization refers to securitizations structured by financial institutions such as investment banks, commercial banks, and non-bank mortgage lenders.

During the years leading up to the subprime mortgage crisis, private label securitizations grew as a share of overall mortgage securitization by purchasing and securitizing low-quality, high-risk mortgages. Agency Securitizations appear to have somewhat lowered their standards, but Agency mortgages remained considerably safer than mortgages in private-label securitizations and performed far better in terms of default rates.

Economist Mark Zandi of Moody's Analytics described moral hazard as a root cause of the subprime mortgage crisis. He wrote that "the risks inherent in mortgage lending became so widely dispersed that no one was forced to worry about the quality of any single loan. As shaky mortgages were combined, diluting any problems into a larger pool, the incentive for responsibility was undermined". He also wrote, "Finance companies weren't subject to the same regulatory oversight as banks. Taxpayers weren't on the hook if they went belly up [pre-crisis], only their shareholders and other creditors were. Finance companies thus had little to discourage them from growing as aggressively as possible, even if that meant lowering or winking at traditional lending standards".

Moral hazard can also occur with borrowers. Borrowers may not act prudently (in the view of the lender) when they invest or spend funds recklessly. For example, credit card companies often limit the amount borrowers can spend with their cards because without such limits, borrowers may spend borrowed funds recklessly, leading to default.

Securitization of mortgages in America started in 1983 at Salomon Brothers and where the risk of each mortgage passed to the next purchaser instead of remaining with the original mortgaging institution. These mortgages and other debt instruments were put into a large pool of debt, and then shares in the pool were sold to many creditors.

Thus, there is no one person responsible for verifying that any one particular loan is sound, that the assets securing that one particular loan are worth what they are supposed to be worth, that the borrower responsible for making payments on the loan can read and write the language in which the papers that he/she signed were written, or even that the paperwork exists and is in good order. It has been suggested that this may have caused the subprime mortgage crisis.

Brokers, who were not lending their own money, pushed risk onto the lenders. Lenders, who sold mortgages soon after underwriting them, pushed risk onto investors. Investment banks bought mortgages and chopped up mortgage-backed securities into slices, some riskier than others. Investors bought securities and hedged against the risk of default and prepayment, pushing those risks further along. In a purely capitalist scenario, the last one holding the risk (like a game of musical chairs) is the one who faces the potential losses. In the sub-prime crisis, however, national credit authorities (the Federal Reserve in the US) assumed the ultimate risk on behalf of the citizenry at large.

Others believe that financial bailouts of lending institutions do not encourage risky lending behavior since there is no guarantee to lending institutions that a bailout will occur. Decreased valuation of a corporation before any bailout would prevent risky, speculative business decisions by executives who fail to conduct proper due diligence in their business transactions. The risk and the burdens of loss became apparent to Lehman Brothers, which did not benefit from a bailout, and other financial institutions and mortgage companies such as Citibank and Countrywide Financial Corporation, whose valuation plunged during the subprime mortgage crisis.

=== Incentives to moral hazard in accounting rules ===
A 2017 report by the Basel Committee on Banking Supervision, an international regulator for the banking sector, noted that the accounting rules (IFRS # 9 and 13 in particular) leave entities significant discretion in determining financial instrument fair value and identified this discretion as a potential source of moral hazard: "The evidence consistent with accounting discretion as contributing to moral hazard behavior indicates that (additional) prudential valuation requirements may be justified".

Banking regulators have taken actions to limit discretion and reduce valuation risk, i.e. the risk to banks' balance sheets arising from financial instrument valuation uncertainties. A row of regulatory documents has been issued, providing detailed prudential requirements that have many points of contact with the accounting rules and have the indirect effect of curbing the incentives for moral hazard by limiting the discretion left to banks in valuating financial instruments.

=== Connection to the 2008 financial crisis ===
Many scholars and journalists have argued that moral hazard played a role in the 2008 financial crisis, since numerous actors in the financial market may have had an incentive to increase their exposure to risk. In general, there are three ways in which moral hazard may have manifested itself in the lead up to the financial crisis:

- Asset managers may have had an incentive to take on more risk when managing other people's money, particularly if they were paid as a percentage of the fund's profits. If they took on more risk, they could expect higher payoff for themselves and were somewhat shielded from losses because they were spending other people's money. Therefore, asset managers may have been in a situation of moral hazard, where they would take on more risk than appropriate for a given client because they did not bear the cost of failure.
- Mortgage loan originators, such as Washington Mutual, may have had an incentive to understate the risk of loans they originated because the loans were often sold to mortgage pools (see mortgage-backed securities). Because loan originators were paid on a per-mortgage basis, they had an incentive to produce as many mortgages as possible, even if they were risky. Because these institutions did not expect to hold on to the loans until maturity, they could pass on the risk to the buyer of the loans. Therefore, mortgage loan originators may have been in a situation of moral hazard, because they did not bear the costs of the risky mortgages they were underwriting.
- Third, large banks may have believed they were "too big to fail". That is, because these banks were so ingrained in the US economy, the federal government would not have allowed them to fail in order to prevent a full-scale economic crash. This belief may have been shaped by the 1998 bailout of Long-Term Capital Management. "Too big to fail" banks may have believed they were essentially invincible to failure, thus putting them in a position of moral hazard: they could take on big risks – thus increasing their expected payoff – thinking that the federal government would bail them out in the event of a major failure. Therefore, large banks may have been in a situation of moral hazard, because they did not bear the costs of a catastrophic collapse.

Notably, the Financial Crisis Inquiry Commission (FCIC), tasked by Congress with investigating the causes of the financial crisis, cited moral hazard as a component of the crisis, arguing that many factors, including deregulation in the derivatives market in 2000, reduced federal oversight, and the potential for government bailout of "too big to fail" institutions all played a role in increasing moral hazard in the years leading up to the collapse.

Others have argued that moral hazard could not have played a role in the financial crisis for three main reasons. First, in the event of a catastrophic failure, a government bailout would only come after major losses for the company. So even if a bailout was expected it would not prevent the firm from taking losses. Second, there is some evidence that big banks were not expecting the crisis and thus were not expecting government bailouts, though the FCIC tried hard to contest this idea. Third, some have argued that negative externalities from corporate governance were a more important cause, since some risky investments may have had positive expected payoff for the firm but negative expected payoff to society.

== Insurance industry ==
Moral hazard has been studied by insurers and academics, such as in the work of Kenneth Arrow, Tom Baker, and John Nyman.

The name comes originally from the insurance industry. Insurance companies worried that protecting their clients from risks (like fire, or car accidents) might encourage those clients to behave in riskier ways (like smoking in bed or not wearing seatbelts). This problem may inefficiently discourage those companies from protecting their clients as much as the clients would like to be protected.

Economists argue that the inefficiency results from information asymmetry. If insurance companies could perfectly observe the actions of their clients, they could deny coverage to clients choosing risky actions (like smoking in bed or not wearing seat belts), allowing them to provide thorough protection against risk (fire or accidents) without encouraging risky behavior. However, since insurance companies cannot perfectly observe their clients' actions, they are discouraged from providing the amount of protection that would be provided in a world with perfect information.

Economists distinguish moral hazard from adverse selection, another problem that arises in the insurance industry, which is caused by hidden information, rather than hidden actions.

The same underlying problem of non-observable actions also affects other contexts besides the insurance industry. It also arises in banking and finance: if a financial institution knows it is protected by a lender of last resort, it may make riskier investments than it would in the absence of the protection.

In insurance markets, moral hazard occurs when the behavior of the insured party changes in a way that raises costs for the insurer since the insured party no longer bears the full costs of that behavior. Because individuals no longer bear the cost of medical services, they have an added incentive to ask for pricier and more elaborate medical service, which would otherwise not be necessary. In those instances, individuals have an incentive to over consume, simply because they no longer bear the full cost of medical services.

Two types of behavior can change. One type is the risky behavior itself, resulting in a before the event moral hazard. Insured parties then behave in a more risky manner, resulting in more negative consequences that the insurer must pay for. For example, after purchasing automobile insurance, some may tend to be less careful about locking the automobile or choose to drive more, thereby increasing the risk of theft or an accident for the insurer. After purchasing fire insurance, some may tend to be less careful about preventing fires (say, by smoking in bed or neglecting to replace the batteries in fire alarms). A further example has been identified in flood risk management in which it is proposed that the possession of insurance undermines efforts to encourage people to integrate flood protection and resilience measures in properties exposed to flooding.

A second type of behavior that may change is the reaction to the negative consequences of risk once they have occurred and insurance is provided to cover their costs. That may be called ex post (after the event) moral hazard. Insured parties then do not behave in a more risky manner that results in more negative consequences, but they ask an insurer to pay for more of the negative consequences from risk as insurance coverage increases. For example, without medical insurance, some may forgo medical treatment due to its costs and simply deal with substandard health. However, after medical insurance becomes available, some may ask an insurance provider to pay for the cost of medical treatment that would not have occurred otherwise.

Sometimes moral hazard is so severe that it makes insurance policies impossible. Coinsurance, co-payments, and deductibles reduce the risk of moral hazard by increasing the out-of-pocket spending of consumers, which decreases their incentive to consume. These methods work by increasing out-of-pocket expenses for consumers, thereby reducing the incentive for the insured to engage in excessive consumption. For example, by requiring individuals to pay a portion of their health care costs through coinsurance, copayment, or deductibles, insurance providers can give people an incentive to consume less health care and avoid making unnecessary claims. This can help reduce moral hazard by aligning the interests of the insured and the insurer.

== Numerical example ==
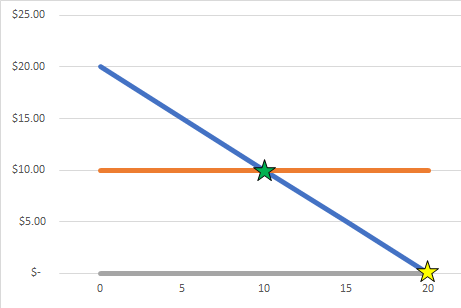
The blue line represents the downward sloping marginal benefit curve. The orange line represents the constant $10 marginal cost curve without insurance. The green star is the market equilibrium. When the individual is insured, the marginal cost curve shifts down to 0, leading to a new equilibrium at the yellow star.

Consider a potential case of moral hazard in the health care market caused by the purchase of health insurance. Assume health care has constant marginal cost of $10 per unit and the individual's demand is given by Q = 20 − P. Assuming a perfectly competitive market, at equilibrium, the price will be $10 per unit and the individual will consume 10 units of health care. Now, consider the same individual with health insurance. Assume this health insurance makes health care free for the individual. In this case, the individual will have a price of $0 for the health care and thus will consume 20 units. The price will still be $10, but the insurance company would be the one bearing the costs.

This example shows numerically how moral hazard could occur with health insurance. The individual consumes more health care than the equilibrium quantity because they don't bear the cost of the additional care.

== Economic theory ==
In economic theory, moral hazard is a situation in which the behavior of one party may change to the detriment of another after the transaction has taken place. For example, a person with insurance against automobile theft may be less cautious about locking their car because the negative consequences of vehicle theft are now (partially) the responsibility of the insurance company. A party makes a decision about how much risk to take, while another party bears the costs if things go badly, and the party insulated from risk behaves differently from how it would if it were fully exposed to the risk.

In microeconomics, agency theory analyses the relationship between the principal, the party who delegates decision making authority, and the agent, who executes the service. This theory is a key concept used to explore and resolve issues that have arisen within the relationship of agents and principals, which is known as the principal-agent problem. The theory is subdivided into two categories: (1) the moral hazard model and; (2) the adverse selection model. To summarise the latter, adverse selection arises when two parties hold unequal or asymmetric information. In the instance of contract theory (which encompasses agency theory), in the adverse selection model the agent holds private information before the contract is created with the principal, whereas in the moral hazard model the agent is informed of the withheld information privately after the contract is created with the principal.

According to contract theory moral hazard results from a situation in which a hidden action occurs. Bengt Holmström said this:

It has long been recognized that a problem of moral hazard may arise when individuals engage in risk sharing under conditions such that their privately taken actions affect the probability distribution of the outcome.

Moral hazard can be divided into two types when it involves asymmetric information (or lack of verifiability) of the outcome of a random event. An ex ante moral hazard is a change in behavior prior to the outcome of the random event, whereas ex post involves behavior after the outcome. For instance, in the case of a health insurance company insuring an individual during a specific time period, the final health of the individual can be thought of as the outcome. The individual taking greater risks during the period would be ex-ante moral hazard whereas lying about a fictitious health problem to defraud the insurance company would be ex post moral hazard. A second example is the case of a bank making a loan to an entrepreneur for a risky business venture. The entrepreneur becoming overly risky would be ex ante moral hazard, but willful default (wrongly claiming the venture failed when it was profitable) is ex post moral hazard.

According to Hart and Holmström (1987), moral hazard models can be subdivided in models with hidden action and models with hidden information. In the former case, after the contract has been signed the agent chooses an action (such as an effort level) that cannot be observed by the principal. In the latter case, after the contract has been signed there is a random draw by nature that determines the agent's type (such as his valuation for a good or his costs of effort). In the literature, two reasons have been discussed why moral hazard may imply that the first-best solution (the solution that would be attained under complete information) is not achieved.

Firstly, the agent may be risk-averse, so there is a trade-off between providing the agent with incentives and insuring the agent. Secondly, the agent may be risk-neutral but wealth-constrained and so the agent cannot make a payment to the principal and there is a trade-off between providing incentives and minimizing the agent's limited-liability rent. Among the early contributors to the contract-theoretic literature on moral hazard were Oliver Hart and Sanford J. Grossman. In the meantime, the moral hazard model has been extended to the cases of multiple periods and multiple tasks, both with risk-averse and risk-neutral agents.

There are also models that combine hidden action and hidden information. Since there is no data on unobservable variables, it is quite difficult to be able to test directly the contract-theoretic moral hazard model, however there have been some successful indirect tests with field data. Direct tests of moral hazard theory are feasible in laboratory settings, using the tools of experimental economics. In such a setup, Hoppe and Schmitz (2018) have corroborated central insights of moral hazard theory.

== Managerial economics ==
In the field of managerial economics, moral hazard refers to a situation in which an individual or entity engages in risky behaviour due to the knowledge that the costs associated with such behaviour will be borne by another party. This phenomenon often arises in the presence of information asymmetry, where one party possesses more information than the other. For instance, within an employment relationship, an employee may engage in risky behaviour with the understanding that any negative consequences will be absorbed by their employer. To mitigate the moral hazard, firms may implement various mechanisms such as performance-based incentives, monitoring and screening to align the interests of both parties and reduce the likelihood of risky behaviour.

== See also ==
- Bailout
- Brinkmanship
- Conflict of interest
- Disparate impact
- Economic inequality
- Feedback
- Free rider problem
- Game theory
- Information economics
- Necropolitics
- Offset hypothesis
- Personal responsibility
- Perverse incentive
- Risk compensation
- Samaritan's dilemma
- Speciesism
- Systemic risk
- Too big to fail
- Tragedy of the commons
- Unintended consequences
- Wild animal suffering
