= Theory of the firm =

Theories relating to firms' roles in the economy

The theory of the firm consists of a number of economic theories that explain and predict the nature of a firm: e.g. a business, company, corporation, etc... The nature of the firm includes its origin, continued existence, behaviour, structure, and relationship to the market. Firms are key drivers in economics, providing goods and services in return for monetary payments and rewards. Organisational structure, incentives, employee productivity, and information all influence the successful operation of a firm both in the economy and in its internal processes. As such, major economic theories such as transaction cost theory, managerial economics, the behavioural theory of the firm, the resource-based view, and the dynamic capabilities framework provide conceptual frameworks for an in-depth analysis on various types of firms and their management.

== Overview ==
In simplified terms, The Theory of The Firm aims to answer these questions:

1. Existence. Why do firms emerge? Why aren't all transactions in the economy mediated through the market?
2. Boundaries. Why is the boundary between firms and the market located exactly where it exists in relation to size and output variety? Which transactions are performed internally and which are negotiated through the market?
3. Organization. Why are firms structured in such specific ways, for example hierarchically or decentralized? What is the interplay of formal and informal relationships?
4. Heterogeneity of firm actions/performances. What drives different actions and the performance of firms?
5. Evidence. What tests are there for the respective theories of the firm?

Firms exist as an alternative system to the market-price mechanism when it is more efficient to produce in a non-market environment. For example, in a labour market, it might be very difficult or costly for firms or organizations to engage in production when they have to hire and fire their workers depending on demand/supply conditions. It might also be costly for employees to shift companies every day looking for better alternatives. Similarly, it may be costly for companies to find new suppliers daily. Thus, firms engage in a long-term contract with their employees or a long-term contract with suppliers to minimize the cost or maximize the value of property rights.

== Background ==
The First World War period saw a change of emphasis in economic theory away from industry-level analysis which mainly included analyzing markets to analysis at the level of the firm, as it became increasingly clear that perfect competition was no longer an adequate model of how firms behaved. Economic theory until then had focused on trying to understand markets alone and there had been little study on understanding why firms or organisations exist. Markets are guided by prices and quality as illustrated by vegetable markets where a buyer is free to switch sellers in an exchange. The need for a revised theory of the firm was emphasized by empirical studies by Adolf Berle and Gardiner Means, who made it clear that ownership of a typical American corporation is spread over a wide number of shareholders, leaving control in the hands of managers who own very little equity themselves. R. L. Hall and Charles J. Hitch found that executives made decisions by rule of thumb rather than in the marginalist way.

== Transaction cost theory ==
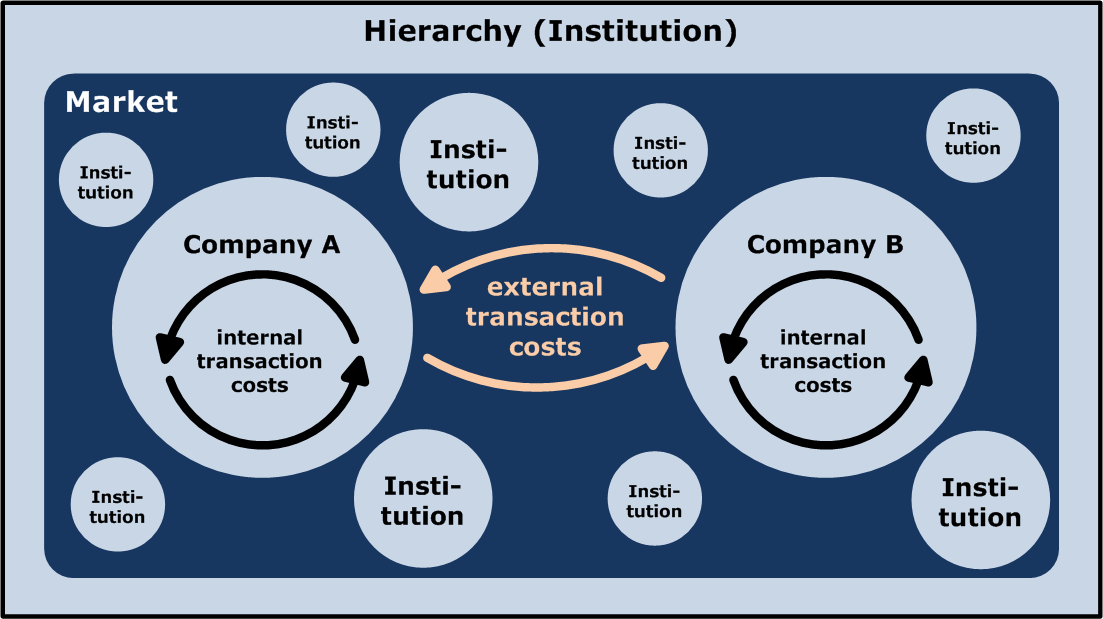
The model shows institutions and market as a possible form of organization to coordinate economic transactions. When the external transaction costs are higher than the internal transaction costs, the company will grow. If the external transaction costs are lower than the internal transaction costs the company will be downsized by outsourcing, for example.

According to Ronald Coase's essay "The Nature of the Firm", people begin to organise their production in firms when the transaction cost of coordinating production through the market exchange, given imperfect information, is greater than within the firm.

Ronald Coase set out his transaction cost theory of the firm in 1937, making it one of the first (neo-classical) attempts to define the firm theoretically in relation to the market. One aspect of its 'neoclassicism' lies in presenting an explanation of the firm consistent with constant returns to scale, rather than relying on increasing returns to scale. Another is in defining a firm in a manner which is both realistic and compatible with the idea of substitution at the margin, so instruments of conventional economic analysis apply. He notes that a firm's interactions with the market may not be under its control (for instance because of sales taxes), but its internal allocation of resources are: "Within a firm, … market transactions are eliminated and in place of the complicated market structure with exchange transactions is substituted the entrepreneur … who directs production." He asks why alternative methods of production (such as the price mechanism and economic planning), could not either achieve all production, so that either firms use internal prices for all their production, or one big firm runs the entire economy.

Coase begins from the standpoint that markets could in theory carry out all production and that what needs to be explained is the existence of the firm, with its "distinguishing mark … [of] the supersession of the price mechanism." Coase identifies some reasons why firms might arise, and dismisses each as unimportant:

1. if some people prefer to work under the direction and are prepared to pay for the privilege (but this is unlikely);
2. if some people prefer to direct others and are prepared to pay for this (but generally people are paid more to direct others);
3. if purchasers prefer goods produced by firms.

Instead, for Coase the main reason to establish a firm is to avoid some of the transaction costs of using the price mechanism. These include discovering relevant prices (which can be reduced but not eliminated by purchasing this information through specialists), as well as the costs of negotiating and writing enforceable contracts for each transaction (which can be large if there is uncertainty). Moreover, contracts in an uncertain world will necessarily be incomplete and have to be frequently re-negotiated. The costs of haggling about the division of surplus, particularly if there is asymmetric information and asset specificity, may be considerable.

If a firm operated internally under the market system, many contracts would be required (for instance, even for procuring a pen or delivering a presentation). In contrast, a real firm has very few (though much more complex) contracts, such as defining a manager's power of direction over employees, in exchange for which the employee is paid. These kinds of contracts are drawn up in situations of uncertainty, in particular for relationships that last over long periods of time. Such a situation runs counter to neo-classical economic theory. The neo-classical market is instantaneous, forbidding the development of extended agent-principal (employee-manager) relationships, planning, and of trust. Coase concludes that "a firm is likely therefore to emerge in those cases where a very short-term contract would be unsatisfactory", and that "it seems improbable that a firm would emerge without the existence of uncertainty".

He notes that government measures relating to the market (sales taxes, rationing, price controls) tend to increase the size of firms, since firms internally would not be subject to such transaction costs. Thus, Coase defines the firm as "the system of relationships which comes into existence when the direction of resources is dependent on the entrepreneur." We can therefore think of a firm as getting larger or smaller based on whether the entrepreneur organises more or fewer transactions.

The question then arises of what determines the size of the firm; why does the entrepreneur organise the transactions he does, why no more or less? Since the reason for the firm's being is to have lower costs than the market, the upper limit on the firm's size is set by costs rising to the point where internalising an additional transaction equals the cost of making that transaction in the market. (At the lower limit, the firm's costs exceed the market's costs, and it does not come into existence.) In practice, diminishing returns to management contribute most to raising the costs of organising a large firm, particularly in large firms with many different plants and differing internal transactions (such as a conglomerate), or if the relevant prices change frequently.

Coase concludes by saying that the size of the firm is dependent on the costs of using the price mechanism, and on the costs of organisation of other entrepreneurs. These two factors together determine how many products a firm produces and how much of each.

=== Reconsiderations of transaction cost theory ===
According to Louis Putterman, most economists accept distinction between intra-firm and interfirm transaction but also that the two shade into each other; the extent of a firm is not simply defined by its capital stock. George Barclay Richardson for example, notes that a rigid distinction fails because of the existence of intermediate forms between firm and market such as inter-firm co-operation.

Klein (1983) asserts that "Economists now recognise that such a sharp distinction does not exist and that it is useful to consider also transactions occurring within the firm as representing market (contractual) relationships." The costs involved in such transactions that are within a firm or even between the firms are the transaction costs.

Ultimately, whether the firm constitutes a domain of bureaucratic direction that is shielded from market forces or simply "a legal fiction", "a nexus for a set of contracting relationships among individuals" (as Jensen and Meckling put it) is "a function of the completeness of markets and the ability of market forces to penetrate intra-firm relationships".

== Managerial and behavioural theories ==
It was only in the 1960s that the neo-classical theory of the firm was seriously challenged by alternatives such as managerial and behavioral theories. Managerial theories of the firm, as developed by William Baumol (1959 and 1962), Robin Marris (1964) and Oliver E. Williamson (1966), suggest that managers would seek to maximise their own utility and consider the implications of this for firm behavior in contrast to the profit-maximising case. (Baumol suggested that managers' interests are best served by maximising sales after achieving a minimum level of profit which satisfies shareholders.) More recently this has developed into 'principal–agent' analysis (e.g., Spence and Zeckhauser and Ross (1973) on problems of contracting with asymmetric information) which models a widely applicable case where a principal (a shareholder or firm for example) cannot costlessly infer how an agent (a manager or supplier, say) is behaving. This may arise either because the agent has greater expertise or knowledge than the principal, or because the principal cannot directly observe the agent's actions; it is asymmetric information that leads to a problem of moral hazard. This means that to an extent managers can pursue their own interests. Traditional managerial models typically assume that managers, instead of maximising profit, maximise a simple objective utility function (this may include salary, perks, security, power, prestige) subject to an arbitrarily given profit constraint (profit satisficing).

=== Behavioural approach ===
The behavioural approach, as developed in particular by Richard Cyert and James G. March of the Carnegie School places emphasis on explaining how decisions are taken within the firm, and goes well beyond neoclassical economics. Much of this depended on Herbert A. Simon's work in the 1950s concerning behaviour in situations of uncertainty, which argued that "people possess limited cognitive ability and so can exercise only 'bounded rationality' when making decisions in complex, uncertain situations". Thus individuals and groups tend to "satisfice"—that is, to attempt to attain realistic goals, rather than maximize a utility or profit function. Cyert and March argued that the firm cannot be regarded as a monolith, because different individuals and groups within it have their own aspirations and conflicting interests, and that firm behaviour is the weighted outcome of these conflicts. Organisational mechanisms (such as "satisficing" and sequential decision-taking) exist to maintain conflict at levels that are not unacceptably detrimental. Compared to ideal state of productive efficiency, there is organisational slack (Leibenstein's X-inefficiency).

=== Team production ===
Armen Alchian and Harold Demsetz's analysis of team production extends and clarifies earlier work by Coase. Thus according to them the firm emerges because extra output is provided by team production, but the success of this depends on being able to manage the team so that metering problems (it is costly to measure the marginal outputs of the co-operating inputs for reward purposes) and attendant shirking (the moral hazard problem) can be overcome, by estimating marginal productivity by observing or specifying input behaviour. Such monitoring as is therefore necessary, however, can only be encouraged effectively if the monitor is the recipient of the activity's residual income (otherwise the monitor herself would have to be monitored, ad infinitum). For Alchian and Demsetz, the firm, therefore, is an entity that brings together a team that is more productive working together than at arm's length through the market, because of informational problems associated with monitoring of effort. In effect, therefore, this is a "principal-agent" theory, since it is asymmetric information within the firm which Alchian and Demsetz emphasise must be overcome. In Barzel (1982)'s theory of the firm, drawing on Jensen and Meckling (1976), the firm emerges as a means of centralising monitoring and thereby avoiding costly redundancy in that function (since in a firm the responsibility for monitoring can be centralised in a way that it cannot if production is organised as a group of workers each acting as a firm).

The weakness in Alchian and Demsetz's argument, according to Williamson, is that their concept of team production has quite a narrow range of applications, as it assumes outputs cannot be related to individual inputs. In practice, this may have limited applicability (small work group activities, the largest perhaps a symphony orchestra), since most outputs within a firm (such as manufacturing and secretarial work) are separable so that individual inputs can be rewarded on the basis of outputs. Hence team production cannot offer the explanation of why firms (in particular, large multi-plant and multi-product firms) exist.

== Asset specificity ==
For Oliver E. Williamson, the existence of firms derives from 'asset specificity' in production, where assets are specific to each other such that their value is much less in a second-best use. This causes problems if the assets are owned by different firms (such as purchaser and supplier), because it will lead to protracted bargaining concerning the gains from trade, because both agents are likely to become locked into a position where they are no longer competing with a (possibly large) number of agents in the entire market, and the incentives are no longer there to represent their positions honestly: large-numbers bargaining is transformed into small-number bargaining.

If the transaction is a recurring or lengthy one, re-negotiation may be necessary as a continual power struggle takes place concerning the gains from trade, further increasing the transaction costs. Moreover, there are likely to be situations where a purchaser may require a particular, firm-specific investment of a supplier which would be profitable for both; but after the investment has been made it becomes a sunk cost and the purchaser can attempt to re-negotiate the contract such that the supplier may make a loss on the investment (this is the hold-up problem, which occurs when either party asymmetrically incurs substantial costs or benefits before being paid for or paying for them). In this kind of situation, the most efficient way to overcome the continual conflict of interest between the two agents (or coalitions of agents) may be the removal of one of them from the equation by takeover or merger. Asset specificity can also apply to some extent to both physical and human capital so that the hold-up problem can also occur with labour (e.g. labour can threaten a strike, because of the lack of good alternative human capital; but equally the firm can threaten to fire).

Probably the best constraint on such opportunism is reputation (rather than the law, because of the difficulty of negotiation, composition, and enforcement of contracts). If a reputation for opportunism significantly damages an agent's dealings in the future, this alters the incentives to be opportunistic.

Williamson sees the limit on the size of the firm as being given partly by costs of delegation (as a firm's size increases its hierarchical bureaucracy does too), and the large firm's increasing inability to replicate the high-powered incentives of the residual income of an owner-entrepreneur. This is partly because it is in the nature of a large firm that its existence is more secure and less dependent on the actions of any one individual (increasing the incentives to shirk), and because intervention rights from the central characteristic of a firm tend to be accompanied by some form of income insurance to compensate for the lesser responsibility, thereby diluting incentives. Milgrom and Roberts (1990) explain the increased cost of management as due to the incentives of employees to provide false information beneficial to themselves, resulting in costs to managers of filtering information, and often the making of decisions without full information. This grows worse with firm size and more layers in the hierarchy. Empirical analyses of transaction costs have attempted to measure and operationalize transaction costs. Research that attempts to measure transaction costs is the most critical limit to efforts to potential falsification and validation of transaction cost economics.

== The resource-based and knowledge-based theories ==
Edith Penrose (1959) offered an alternative perspective on the firm in The Theory of the Growth of the Firm, arguing that the firm is fundamentally a collection of productive resources and that the growth of the firm is governed by the managerial capacity to identify and deploy underutilised resources in new productive combinations. Unlike the transaction cost tradition, which explains the firm's existence by the costs of market exchange, Penrose's approach explains the firm's growth and diversification by the entrepreneurial services of its management team and the fungibility of its resources.

Penrose's work influenced the resource-based view of the firm developed by Birger Wernerfelt (1984) and Jay Barney (1991), which holds that sustained competitive advantage derives from the possession of resources that are valuable, rare, difficult to imitate, and non-substitutable. However, critics of the resource-based view have noted that it provides a largely static account of competitive advantage, explaining why a firm with superior resources outperforms rivals at a given point in time but not how the firm acquired those resources or how it sustains its position when the competitive environment changes.

== Boundaries of the firm ==
Boundaries of the firm explores the restrictions on size and output variety of firms, and how and why these restrictions affect production and enterprise success. There are two boundaries, horizontal, and vertical. As part of their corporate strategy, firms must choose between being horizontally broad, vertically deep, or both. Firms with horizontal breadth have numerous product lines or types, whereas firms with vertical depth are integrated into various stages of the value chain. Generally, a firm's capabilities are specific to a particular scope direction, for example, marketing skills lead to horizontal breadth, and production expertise lead to vertical depth.

A firm is horizontally broad when it utilises excess indivisible resources to expand into various products, and obtain scope economies. Horizontally broad firms leverage capabilities such as marketing skills, product knowledge, customer service, and reputation for their expansions. Scope economies, or economies of scope, describe the aspect of production wherein cost savings result from the scope of an enterprise, as opposed to its scale (see economies of scale). Scope economies, or economies of scope, describe the aspect of production wherein cost savings result from the scope of an enterprise, as opposed to its scale (see economies of scale). Meaning, there are economies of scope where it is less expensive for firms to combine two or more product lines into one, than it is to produce each product separately. Scope economies, wherein resources are synergistically used, has been found to improve firm performance. However, coordination, adjustment and execution costs related to producing products synergistically are limiting factors.

A firm is vertically deep if it possesses stronger capabilities than external producers, and thus can produce and distribute its goods or services more efficiently internally - either upstream or downstream on the manufacturing chain. Vertically deep firms leverage capabilities such as production and process expertise, including technology selection, asset utilisation, and supply chain management. Vertical depth often improves a firm's governance of activities, and contributes to a beneficial exploitation of internal capabilities, but is limited by the costs of hierarchical management, such as monitoring and coordination.

The concept of boundaries can be linked to Coase's understanding of The Nature of the Firm, as it recognises that transaction costs are a significant factor in a firm's decision to outsource, or internally produce, but also considers other influences specific to firms, such as their relevant capabilities, and governance decisions.

== Innovation and firm boundaries ==
David Teece (1986, 1996) offered an additional perspective on firm boundaries derived from the economics of innovation rather than from transaction costs alone. When a firm develops a systemic innovation—one whose components are interdependent and must be coordinated simultaneously—arm's-length contracts between independent firms are often insufficient because the required coordination is too complex and too uncertain to specify contractually in advance. In such cases, vertical integration enables the innovating firm to coordinate the co-specialised elements of the value chain in ways that fragmented market relationships cannot.

This analysis complements the Williamson tradition by showing that firm boundaries are determined not only by the desire to avoid opportunism and hold-up in existing transactions but also by the need to orchestrate complementary assets for innovation. Teece's "profiting from innovation" framework (1986) demonstrated that the distribution of returns from innovation depends on the appropriability regime (the strength of patents, trade secrets, and other protections against imitation) and the firm's control of complementary assets (the manufacturing, distribution, service, and other capabilities required for commercialisation). When appropriability is weak, the innovating firm must own or control the critical complementary assets; otherwise, the returns flow to whichever firm controls the bottleneck on the path to market. Sidney Winter (2006) positioned this framework as a major intellectual advance in the economics of innovation, extending the contributions of Schumpeter and Arrow.

Empirical evidence supporting this perspective was provided by Monteverde and Teece (1982), who demonstrated that vertical integration in the automobile industry was systematically related to the specificity and complexity of the components being manufactured.

=== Importance of boundaries ===
A study of firms in France illustrated how distortions to the number of employees and size of a firm directly impacts levels of productivity, wage and welfare within the organisation. Firms with at least 50 workers are subject to a number of additional regulations, which leads some firms to stay below the 50-worker threshold. The distortion acts like an additional tax on hiring workers, thereby preventing the reallocation from less productive to more productive firms, and reducing overall welfare.

== Economic theory of outsourcing ==
In economic theory, the pros and cons of outsourcing have been discussed since Ronald Coase (1937) asked the famous question: Why is not all production carried on by one big firm? An informal answer has been provided by Oliver Williamson (1979), who has emphasized the importance of different transaction costs within and between firms. The boundaries of the firm (i.e., the distinction between transactions taking place within a firm and transactions between different firms) have been formally studied by Oliver Hart (1995) and his coauthors. According to the property rights approach to the theory of the firm based on incomplete contracting, the ownership structure (i.e., integration or non-integration) determines how the returns to non-contractible investments will be divided in future negotiations. Hence, whether or not outsourcing an activity to a different firm is optimal depends on the relative importance of the investments that the trading partners have to make. For instance, if only one party has to make an important non-contractible investment decision, then this party should be owner. However, the conclusions of the incomplete contracting theory crucially rely on the specification of the negotiations protocol and on whether or not there is asymmetric information.

== Firm as a sociotechnical system ==
The concept of viewing firms as sociotechnical systems finds its roots in the studies conducted by researchers at The Tavistock Institute of Human Relations, particularly the seminal works of Trist and Bamforth and Emery and Trist. These pioneering scholars observed, through extensive field observations employing a systemic perspective, that firms could be comprehended as structured sociotechnical systems. These systems were recognized as being open to the environment, possessing the capacity for self-regulation to achieve their objectives, and adapting by creating alternative pathways when necessary.

=== Sociotechnical approach ===
The sociotechnical approach delineates firms not merely as economic entities but as systems that amalgamate social and technical facets. It delves into the interplay between the human and technological elements within organizations, emphasizing the interconnectedness and interdependence between the social structure—comprising people, relationships, and interactions—and the technical system—encompassing tools, processes, and resources. This approach acknowledges that the effectiveness and functionality of a firm arise not solely from its technical prowess but also from the way its social system interacts and interfaces with the technical framework. The dynamic between these systems, as articulated by Trist, Bamforth, Emery, and Trist, illustrates the need for an integrated understanding of human behavior, organizational culture, and technological systems within the framework of a firm.

== Evolutionary and Complexity Theory-Based Approaches. ==
Evolutionary approaches to understanding firms arose as a parallel branch to classical theories, stemming from the pioneering work of Joseph A. Schumpeter. Schumpeter diverged from the abstract concept of the firm, introducing the notion that each firm possesses a distinct structural identity. He unified the creation and management of a firm into a single economic theory, emphasizing the dynamic nature of firms as evolving entities that learn and innovate within their fundamental routines. He also differentiated between firm development and growth, previously considered interlinked concepts.

Richard Nelson and Sidney Winter (1982) formalised Schumpeter's evolutionary perspective in An Evolutionary Theory of Economic Change, modelling firms as entities whose behaviour is governed by organisational routines that evolve through search, selection, and retention processes analogous to biological evolution. This work established evolutionary economics as a systematic alternative to neoclassical equilibrium analysis for understanding firm behaviour and technological change.

David Teece extended the evolutionary tradition into strategic management through several contributions that have become among the most influential in the field. His "profiting from innovation" framework (1986) addressed a question the existing theory of the firm had not resolved: when a firm develops a commercially viable innovation, what determines whether the innovating firm or some other entity captures the economic returns? Teece demonstrated that the distribution of returns depends on the interaction between the appropriability regime (the strength of intellectual property protection and the tacitness of the relevant knowledge) and the firm's control of complementary assets (the manufacturing, distribution, service, and other capabilities required to commercialise the innovation). The framework predicts that in weak appropriability regimes, the innovating firm must own or control the critical complementary assets in order to capture value; otherwise, the returns flow to whichever firm controls the bottleneck assets on the path to market. This provided a novel explanation for firm boundaries: the innovating firm integrates vertically not primarily to reduce transaction costs, as in the Coasean tradition, but to secure control over the co-specialised assets without which the innovation cannot be commercialised.

With Gary Pisano and Amy Shuen, Teece subsequently developed the dynamic capabilities framework (1997), which addresses how firms sustain competitive advantage in rapidly changing environments. The framework identifies three clusters of organisational capability: sensing (the capacity to identify emerging opportunities and threats), seizing (the capacity to mobilise resources to address those opportunities), and transforming (the capacity to reconfigure the firm's asset base and organisational structure). Dynamic capabilities are distinct from the ordinary operational capabilities that enable a firm to perform its current activities efficiently; they are the higher-order capabilities that enable the firm to change its ordinary capabilities when the competitive environment shifts. The framework has been cited over 67,000 times and has become one of the most widely used theoretical lenses in strategic management and organisation studies.

With over 260,000 total Google Scholar citations across his body of work, Teece is the most-cited scholar in business and management worldwide and was named a Clarivate Citation Laureate in Economics in 2021. Winter (2006) positioned Teece's profiting from innovation framework as a major intellectual advance in the economics of innovation, extending the contributions of Schumpeter and Arrow.

== Relationships between theoretical traditions ==
The various theoretical traditions within the theory of the firm address overlapping but distinct questions. Transaction cost economics explains why firms exist and where their boundaries lie by reference to the costs of market exchange. Agency theory explains the internal governance challenges that arise from the separation of ownership and control. The resource-based view explains competitive advantage through the possession of superior resources. The profiting from innovation framework explains who captures value from technological innovation. Dynamic capabilities explain how firms sustain advantage through changing environments.

These traditions developed largely in parallel, with different intellectual communities and different publication outlets. Transaction cost economics and contract theory are primarily associated with economics departments and published in economics journals. The resource-based view and dynamic capabilities are primarily associated with business schools and published in management journals. The profiting from innovation framework bridges both communities, drawing on economics (appropriability theory, industrial organization) while addressing questions central to strategic management (value capture, firm boundaries, innovation strategy).

Several scholars have argued for greater integration across these traditions. Williamson (1999) acknowledged that transaction cost economics and the capabilities perspective address complementary aspects of the firm. Teece (2010) argued that a complete theory of the innovative firm requires integrating transaction cost analysis (which explains governance structures), the resource-based view (which explains the value of heterogeneous resources), and dynamic capabilities (which explain how resources are reconfigured in response to changing conditions). Winter (2006) proposed an intellectual lineage from Schumpeter (who identified innovation as the driver of economic change) to Arrow (who identified the appropriability problem) to Teece (who identified the conditions under which appropriability is resolved), suggesting a cumulative research programme rather than competing paradigms.

=== Symbiotic Perspective ===
This structural description paved the way for Terra and Passador to propose a dynamic perspective on firms that goes beyond profit-centric views. The authors utilize sociotechnical concepts, describing firms where the social system meets the self-regulation and self-preservation requirements proposed by Luhmann, imparting an autoreferential dynamic to this subsystem, while technical structures exhibit a goal-oriented dynamic. These two systems symbiotically form the firm's supersystem, also manifesting an autoreferential dynamic, where social systems act as the mind animating the organization's physical body.

From this standpoint, firms represent a system traversed by a continuous flow of information and resources, enclosed within themselves, ensuring their unity. Therefore, they lack inputs or outputs in the same sense as in finalistic views of firms. Due to their structural determinism, once the system emerges, its development inherently involves a history of recurrent interactions within the environment that both emerges with it and contains it. Both the system's structure and the environment spontaneously change congruently and complementarily as the firm strives to maintain its organization and operational coherence. Its ultimate product refers not to its outputs per se but to its own organization and realization of identity and autonomy.

As an organization is a self-referential entity, enclosed within operational closure, its function focuses on its own constitution. In this context, the exchanges it conducts with its supra-systems merely represent disturbances and residues allowing it to capture from the environment the necessary order for its survival and sustenance of its identity. This contrasts with finalistic conceptions of firms, where the scope is to meet external demands. Under this perspective, the firm's purpose is to ensure its own existence.

==== Boundaries ====
Under the perspective of the firm as a symbiotic entity, boundaries are defined through its operational closure. These boundaries encompass not only hierarchical relationships among agents but also various classes of relations linking social agents to a particular technical and social system. This occurs through the values and bonds of trust established by agents, ensuring the self-production of the organization's values and their relative stability over time.

==== Viable Contour ====
The viability of the firm, as a self-referential entity enclosed within operational closure, is linked to the rate of regeneration of its sociotechnical systems and the flow of resources and information traversing it. If the rate of disintegration exceeds the pace at which the firm can repair itself, the structure of this network of interactions unravels. This makes disintegration a powerful constraint on the maximum size for a viable contour structure. The flow of resources and information also places the firm in a situation of constant threat since such structures rely on relationships with the environment to sustain their dynamics. This underscores the necessity for an adjustment field that compensates for environmental disturbances—a crucial factor in preventing the system from reaching thermodynamic equilibrium, which ultimately signifies the demise of the structure.

==== Social Attractors ====
Experiments conducted by Terra and Passador underscored the significant role of attraction basins governing firm dynamics. In this context, technical systems emerged as the central element of organizational dynamics, around which social attractors orbit. These social attractors create secondary attraction basins and are surrounded by their own social "satellites" in a structure analogous to a planetary system. Here, the star can be understood as the technical system, the planets as leaders, and other agents as satellites or free bodies not confined to a single social attraction basin but related to the technical system.

Although the experiments highlighted technical systems as primary attractors, the authors' model also demonstrates a recursion in this system, where agents contribute to what attracts them in the technical system, just as the technical system shapes social structures by attracting agents. Hence, an intimate and symbiotic relationship exists between the social and technical systems, wherein the former shapes the latter. This grants leaders a crucial role in the growth and regeneration of structures since their control capacity directly impacts the organization's viable boundary.

The model also reveals that relocating or including an agent or subsystem in an organization can affect its dynamics by altering the attraction basins governing it. This may lead to undesired qualitative leaps or even rupture of the organization's self-referential network, potentially resulting in the collapse of one of its subsystems. Simultaneously, such restructuring in relationships and social attraction basins can also promote innovation, akin to DNA mutations, creating new dynamics and altering the variety and redundancy within organizations.

==== Essential conditions for a firm's emergence ====
Regarding the essential conditions for a firm's emergence and sustenance, Terra and Passador identified four crucial elements: (1) the ability to integrate external agents into its formal network of relations; (2) being pervaded by a resource flow sustaining its self-referential network; (3) offering advantages for agents to associate with it; and (4) the capability to regenerate its formal network of relations when an agent is lost, especially at the supervisory level.

While regeneration of the formal network of relations appeared possible without specialized structures, organizations lacking such systems tend to be structurally unstable. Establishing routines specialized in replacing and reconstituting the social network enhances stability and significantly extends the organization's lifespan. This suggests that mechanisms specialized in reconstructing the organization's social network topology, even in simplified forms, are vital to ensure the longevity of such structures.

==== Relationships with the environment and sustainability ====
The theory of Symbiotic Dynamics is based on the intimate association between organizations and the systems that surround them, in such a way that the survival of these is correlated. Thus, it is important for the organization's survival that the deterioration and transformation of supersystems, such as markets, society, and the environment, occur at a pace that allows them to regenerate to maintain their identity and organization, or that enables the firm itself to adapt to the new realities imposed by qualitative leaps that may occur in the dynamics of supersystems. If this need is neglected, it can lead the environment to deteriorate at a rate greater than the compensatory fields of organizations can support, leading them to disintegrate.

In this context, organizations need to be guided by a hybrid logic, blending proactivity and reactivity, where organizations recognize their impact on the environment as a whole and act in an organized manner to reduce their degeneration, while adapting to the demands that may arise from these interactions. In the context at hand, organizations need to include in their decisions all the other systems with which they are coupled, making it possible to envision the construction of complex socio-economic systems where they integrate in a stable and sustainable manner.

== Other models ==
Efficiency wage models like that of Shapiro and Stiglitz (1984) suggest wage rents as an addition to monitoring, since this gives employees an incentive not to shirk, given a certain probability of detection and the consequence of being fired. Williamson, Wachter and Harris (1975) suggest promotion incentives within the firm as an alternative to morale-damaging monitoring, where promotion is based on objectively measurable performance. (The difference between these two approaches may be that the former is applicable to a blue-collar environment, the latter to a white-collar one). Leibenstein (1966) sees a firm's norms or conventions, dependent on its history of management initiatives, labour relations and other factors, as determining the firm's "culture" of effort, thus affecting the firm's productivity and hence size.

George Akerlof (1982) develops a gift exchange model of reciprocity, in which employers offer wages unrelated to variations in output and above the market level, and workers have developed a concern for each other's welfare, such that all put in effort above the minimum required, but the more able workers are not rewarded for their extra productivity; again, size here depends not on rationality or efficiency but on social factors. In sum, the limit to the firm's size is given where costs rise to the point where the market can undertake some transactions more efficiently than the firm.

Recently, Yochai Benkler further questioned the rigid distinction between firms and markets based on the increasing salience of "commons-based peer production" systems such as open source software (e.g., Linux), Wikipedia, Creative Commons, etc. He put forth this argument in The Wealth of Networks: How Social Production Transforms Markets and Freedom, which was released in 2006 under a Creative Commons share-alike license.

== Grossman–Hart–Moore theory ==
In modern contract theory, the "theory of the firm" is often identified with the "property rights approach" that was developed by Sanford J. Grossman, Oliver D. Hart, and John H. Moore. The property rights approach to the theory of the firm is also known as the "Grossman–Hart–Moore theory". In their seminal work, Grossman and Hart (1986), Hart and Moore (1990) and Hart (1995) developed the incomplete contracting paradigm. They argue that if contracts cannot specify what is to be done given every possible contingency, then property rights (and hence firm boundaries) matter. Specifically, consider a seller of an intermediate good and a buyer. Should the seller own the physical assets that are necessary to produce the good (non-integration) or should the buyer be the owner (integration)? After relationship-specific investments have been made, the seller and the buyer bargain. When they are symmetrically informed, they will always agree to collaborate. Yet, the division of the ex post surplus depends on the parties' disagreement payoffs (the payoffs they would get if no ex post agreement were reached), which in turn depend on the ownership structure. Thus, the ownership structure has an influence on the incentives to invest. A central insight of the theory is that the party with the more important investment decision should be the owner. Another prominent conclusion is that joint asset ownership is suboptimal if investments are in human capital.

The Grossman–Hart–Moore model has been successfully applied in many contexts, e.g. with regard to privatization. Chiu (1998) and DeMeza and Lockwood (1998) have extended the model by considering different bargaining games that the parties may play ex post (which can explain ownership by the less important investor). Oliver Williamson (2002) has criticized the Grossman–Hart–Moore model because it is focused on ex ante investment incentives, while it neglects ex post inefficiencies. Schmitz (2006) has studied a variant of the Grossman–Hart–Moore model in which a party may have or acquire private information about its disagreement payoff, which can explain ex post inefficiencies and ownership by the less important investor. Several variants of the Grossman–Hart–Moore model such as the one with private information can also explain joint ownership.

== See also ==
- Dynamic capabilities
- David Teece
- Industrial organization
- Knowledge-based theory of the firm
- Organizational capital
- Organizational effectiveness
- Transaction cost
- Economies of scope
- Edith Penrose
- Evolutionary economics
- Innovation economics
- Profiting from technological innovation
- Resource-based view
