= Participation constraint (mechanism design) =

In game theory, and particularly mechanism design, participation constraints or individual rationality constraints are said to be satisfied if a mechanism leaves all participants at least as well-off as they would have been if they hadn't participated.

In terms of information structure, there are 3 types of Participation Constraints:

1. Ex-post, this is the strongest form. Assuming every player knows all others' types and its own type, it makes the decision to participate the game.

2. Interim, this is in the middle. Assuming every player only knows its own type, it decides to participate the game given that its expected utility is greater than its outside option.

3. Ex-ante, this the weakest form. Assuming every player have no knowledge for neither others and itself, the player decide to participate based on the prior distribution of the players type (and then calculate its expected utility).

Unfortunately, it can frequently be shown that participation constraints are incompatible with other desirable properties of mechanisms for many purposes. One of the classic result is Gibbard-Satterthwaite Theorem.

One kind of participation constraint is the participation criterion for voting systems. It requires that by voting, a voter should not decrease the odds of their preferred candidates winning.

== See also ==
- Individual rationality
- Compensating variation
