= Oliver Hart (economist) =

American economist (born 1948)

Sir Oliver Hart
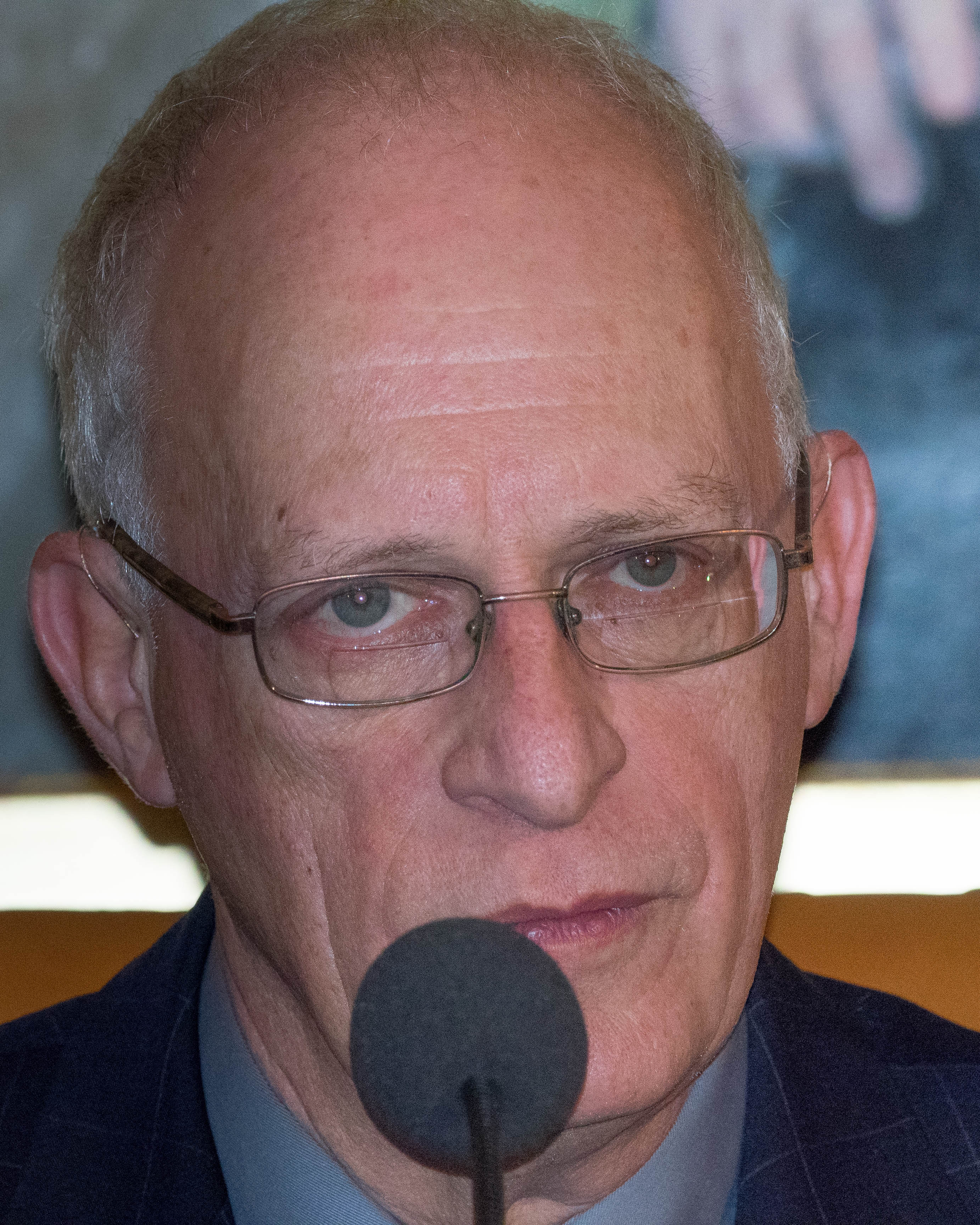
- Oliver Hart at Nobel press conference in Stockholm, Sweden, December 2016
- Born: Oliver Simon D'Arcy Hart; October 9, 1948 (age 77); London, England
- Education: King's College, Cambridge (BA); University of Warwick (MA); Princeton University (PhD)
- Spouse: Rita B. Goldberg
- Children: 2
- Father: Philip D'Arcy Hart
- Awards: Nobel Memorial Prize in Economic Sciences (2016)
- Scientific career
- Fields: Law and economics Corporate Finance
- Workplaces: Harvard University; Massachusetts Institute of Technology; London School of Economics
- Thesis: Essays in the Economics of Uncertainty (1974)
- Doctoral advisor: Michael Rothschild
- Doctoral students: See list: Patrick Bolton; Erik Brynjolfsson; David S. Scharfstein; Jeremy C. Stein; Luigi Zingales; Richard Holden

Sir Oliver Simon D'Arcy Hart (Note: This British person has the barrelled surname D'Arcy Hart, but is known by the surname Hart.) (born October 9, 1948) is a British-American economist, currently the Lewis P. and Linda L. Geyser University Professor at Harvard University. Together with Bengt R. Holmström, he received the Nobel Memorial Prize in Economic Sciences in 2016.

== Biography ==
Oliver Hart was born in Britain to Philip D'Arcy Hart, a medical researcher, and Ruth Meyer, a gynecologist. Both his parents were Jewish; his father was a member of the Montagu family; Oliver's great-grandfather was Samuel Montagu, 1st Baron Swaythling.

Hart earned his B.A. in mathematics at King's College, Cambridge, in 1969 (where his contemporaries included the former Bank of England Governor Mervyn King), his M.A. in economics at the University of Warwick in 1972, and his Ph.D. in economics at Princeton University in 1974. He completed his doctoral dissertation, titled "Essays in the economics of uncertainty", under the supervision of Michael Rothschild. He was a lecturer in economics at University of Essex, a fellow at Churchill College, Cambridge, and then a professor at the London School of Economics. In 1984, he returned to the U.S., where he taught at the Massachusetts Institute of Technology and, since 1993, at Harvard University. He became the first Andrew E. Furer Professor of Economics in 1997 and was chairman of the Harvard economics department from 2000 to 2003. He is a fellow of the American Academy of Arts and Sciences, of the Econometric Society, of the American Finance Association, a corresponding fellow of the British Academy, and a member of the National Academy of Sciences. He has been president of the American Law and Economics Association and vice president of the American Economic Association and has several honorary degrees.

In 2016, Hart won the Nobel Prize in Economics with Bengt Holmström for their work on contract theory, including his work on how ownership should be allocated and when contracting is beneficial over ownership.

Hart was knighted as a Knight Bachelor in the 2023 Birthday Honours for services to economic theory.

== Academics ==
Hart is an expert on contract theory, theory of the firm, corporate finance, and law and economics. His research centers on the roles that ownership structure and contractual arrangements play in the governance and boundaries of corporations. His research has emphasized the importance of contractual incompleteness — the inability of parties to contract on every contingency. He has used his theoretical work on firms in two legal cases as a government expert (Black and Decker v. U.S.A. and WFC Holdings Corp. (Wells Fargo) v. U.S.A.) where companies claimed tax-related benefits as a result from selling some of their business. The government used Hart's research to claim that because the companies retained control of the sold assets, they could not lay claim to the tax benefits.

== Political views ==
In June 2024, 16 Nobel Prize in Economics laureates, including Hart, signed an open letter arguing that Donald Trump’s fiscal and trade policies coupled with efforts to limit the Federal Reserve's independence would reignite inflation in the United States.

== Personal life ==
Hart holds dual British and United States citizenship.

He is married to Rita B. Goldberg, a Harvard literature professor and author of the second-generation Holocaust memoir Motherland: Growing Up With the Holocaust. They have two sons, Daniel and Benjamin.

== Books ==
- Firms, Contracts, and Financial Structure (Oxford University Press, 1995).

== Selected articles ==
- "On the Optimality of Equilibrium when the Market Structure is Incomplete", Journal of Economic Theory, December 1975, pp. 418–443
- "Takeover Bids, the Free-rider problem, and the Theory of the Corporation" (with Sanford J. Grossman), Bell Journal of Economics, Spring 1980, pp. 42–64
- "An Analysis of the principal–agent problem" (with Sanford J. Grossman), Econometrica (January 1983), pp. 7–46.
- "The Market Mechanism as an Incentive Scheme", Bell Journal of Economics, 14 (Autumn 1983), pp. 366–82.
- "The Costs and Benefits of Ownership: A Theory of Vertical and Lateral Integration" (with Sanford J. Grossman), Journal of Political Economy, August 1986, pp. 691–719.
- "One Share-One Vote and the Market for Corporate Control" (with Sanford J. Grossman), Journal of Financial Economics, 1988
- "Incomplete Contracts and Renegotiation" (with John Hardman Moore), Econometrica 56(4) (July 1988).
- "Property Rights and the Nature of the Firm" (with John Hardman Moore), Journal of Political Economy 98(6) (1990).
- " A Theory of Debt Based on the Inalienability of Human Capital" (with John Hardman Moore), Quarterly Journal of Economics, November 1994, pp. 841–879
- "The Proper Scope of Government: Theory and an Application to Prisons" (with Andrei Shleifer and Robert W. Vishny), Quarterly Journal of Economics 112(4) (1997), pp. 1126–61.
- "Contracts as Reference Points" (with John Hardman Moore), Quarterly Journal of Economics, February 2008, pp 1–48.

== See also ==
- List of Jewish Nobel laureates

== Notes ==
Awards
Preceded by Angus Deaton	Laureate of the Nobel Memorial Prize in Economics; 2016; Served alongside: Bengt Holmström	Succeeded by Richard Thaler
