= Bengt Holmström =

Finnish economist and Nobel laureate (born 1949)

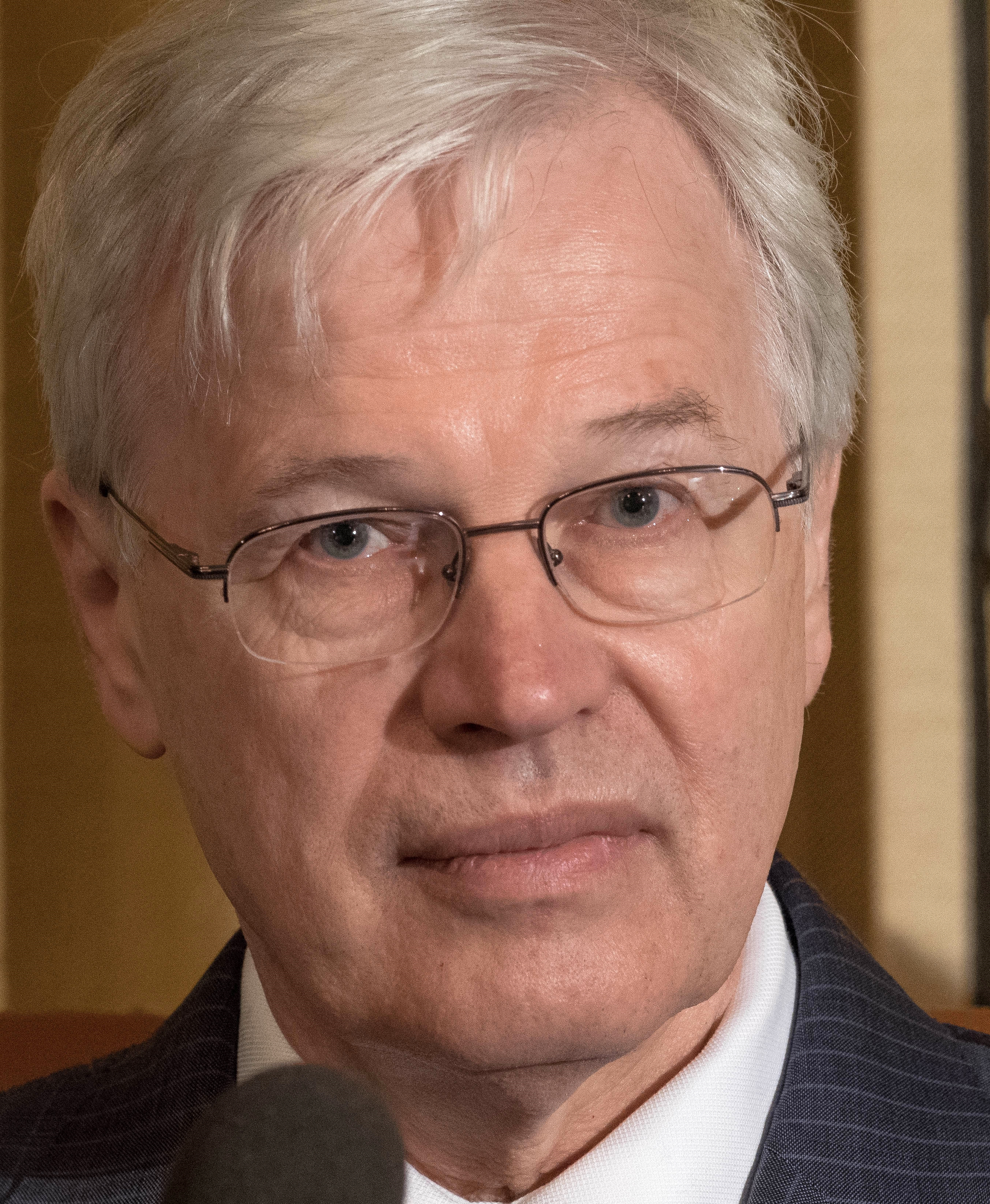
- Holmström in 2016
- Born: Bengt Robert Holmström; 18 April 1949 (age 76); Helsinki, Finland

Academic background
- Education: University of Helsinki (BS); Stanford University (MS, PhD)
- Thesis: On incentives and control in organizations (1978)
- Doctoral advisor: Robert B. Wilson

Academic work
- Institutions: University of Helsinki; Stanford University; Northwestern University; Yale University; Massachusetts Institute of Technology
- Doctoral students: Jonathan Levin
- Awards: Nobel Memorial Prize in Economic Sciences (2016)

Bengt Robert Holmström (born 18 April 1949) is a Finnish economist who is currently Paul A. Samuelson Professor of Economics (Emeritus) at the Massachusetts Institute of Technology. Together with Oliver Hart, he received the Central Bank of Sweden Nobel Memorial Prize in Economic Sciences in 2016.

== Early life and education ==
Holmström was born in Helsinki, Finland, on 18 April 1949, and belongs to the Swedish speaking minority of Finland. He received his B.S. in mathematics and science from the University of Helsinki in 1972. He also received a Master of Science degree in operations research from Stanford University in 1975.

He received his Ph.D. from the Graduate School of Business at Stanford in 1978. He moved to the United States in 1976.

== Career ==
He worked as a corporate planner from 1972 until 1974, then was an assistant professor at the Hanken School of Economics from 1978 until 1979. He served as an associate professor at the Kellogg Graduate School of Management at Northwestern University (1979–1983) and as the Edwin J. Beinecke Professor of Management at Yale University’s School of Management (1983–1994). Holmström was elected Alumnus of The Year by the University of Helsinki Alumni Association in 2010.

He has been on the faculty of M.I.T. since 1994, when he was appointed professor of economics and management at the department of economics and Sloan School of Management.

Holmström is particularly well known for his work on principal-agent theory. His work made seminal advances in understanding contracting in the presence of uncertainty. More generally, he has worked on the theory of contracting and incentives especially as applied to the theory of the firm, to corporate governance and to liquidity problems in financial crises. He praised the taxpayer-backed bailouts by the US government during the 2008 financial crisis and emphasizes the benefits of opacity in the money market.

Holmström was elected member of the Finnish Society of Sciences and Letters in 1992 and an honorary member of the same society in 2016. He is a fellow of the American Academy of Arts and Sciences, the Econometric Society, the European Economic Association and the American Finance Association, and a foreign member of the Royal Swedish Academy of Sciences and the Finnish Academy of Science and Letters. In 2011, he served as President of the Econometric Society. He holds honorary doctorate degrees from the Stockholm School of Economics, Sweden, the University of Vaasa and the Hanken School of Economics in Finland.

Holmström was a member of Nokia's board of directors from 1999 until 2012. He was a member of the Board of the Aalto University from 2008 until 2017.

== Accolades ==
He was awarded the 2012 Banque de France-TSE Senior Prize in Monetary Economics and Finance, the 2013 Stephen A. Ross Prize in Financial Economics and the 2013 Chicago Mercantile Exchange – MSRI Prize for Innovative Quantitative Applications.

In 2016, Holmström won the Sveriges Riksbank Prize in Economic Sciences in Memory of Alfred Nobel together with Oliver Hart "for their contributions to contract theory".

== Personal life ==
He is married to Anneli Holmström and they have one son.

== Publications ==
- Holmström, Bengt (1972). En icke-linear lösningsmetod för allokationsproblem [A nonlinear solution method for allocation problems] (B.Sc. thesis) (in Swedish). University of Helsinki.
- Holmström, Bengt (Spring 1979). "Moral hazard and observability" (PDF). Bell Journal of Economics. 10 (1): 74–91. doi:10.2307/3003320. JSTOR 3003320.
- Holmström, Bengt (Autumn 1982). "Moral hazard in teams" (PDF). Bell Journal of Economics. 13 (2): 324–340. doi:10.2307/3003457. hdl:10419/220831. JSTOR 3003457.
- Holmström, Bengt (1983). "Equilibrium long-term labor contracts" (PDF). Quarterly Journal of Economics. 98: 23–54. doi:10.2307/1885374. JSTOR 1885374. Republished from "Equilibrium long-term labor contracts" (PDF). Kellogg School of Management Discussion Papers. January 1981 [January 1980]. hdl:10419/220774.
- Holmstrom, Bengt (1999). "Managerial incentive problems: A dynamic perspective" (PDF). Review of Economic Studies. 66 (1): 169–182. doi:10.1111/1467-937X.00083. ISSN 0034-6527. JSTOR 2566954.
- Holmström, Bengt; Milgrom, Paul (January 1991). "Multitask Principal–Agent Analyses: Incentive Contracts, Asset Ownership, and Job Design" (PDF). The Journal of Law, Economics, and Organization. 7 (Special issue): 24–52. doi:10.1093/jleo/7.special_issue.24. ISSN 1465-7341. JSTOR 764957.
- Holmström, Bengt; Milgrom, Paul (September 1994). "The firm as an incentive system" (PDF). American Economic Review. 84 (4): 972–991. JSTOR 2118041. ResearchGate:4732703.
- Holmström, Bengt; Roberts, John (1 November 1998). "The boundaries of the firm revisited". Journal of Economic Perspectives. 12 (4): 73–94. doi:10.1257/jep.12.4.73. ISSN 0895-3309.
- Holmström, Bengt; Tirole, Jean (1998). "Private and public supply of liquidity". Journal of Political Economy. 106 (1): 1–40. doi:10.1086/250001. ISSN 0022-3808. JSTOR 10.1086/250001. Republished from "Private and Public Supply of Liquidity" (PDF). NBER Working Papers. Cambridge, Massachusetts: National Bureau of Economic Research. November 1996. doi:10.3386/w5817.

Awards
Preceded by Angus Deaton	Laureate of the Nobel Memorial Prize in Economics; 2016; Served alongside: Oliver Hart	Succeeded by Richard Thaler
