= Displaced sales =

Real estate term for sales captured from consumers outside a firm's local trade area

In real estate investing and retail trade area analysis, displaced sales refer to purchases made by consumers outside their local primary trade area, even when comparable goods or services are available locally. The concept is the direct inverse of retail leakage.

== Definition ==
Displaced sales occur when a firm captures revenue from consumers whose home market lies outside the firm's immediate trade area — in other words, dollars that flow into a local economy from external consumers.

This contrasts with retail leakage, where local consumers spend money outside their home trade area — effectively exporting purchasing power — even when local businesses stock equivalent merchandise.

== Relationship to Retail Leakage ==
Retail gap analysis measures both phenomena simultaneously:

- Leakage — local demand exceeds local supply; purchasing power exits the trade area.
- Surplus / Displaced sales — local supply exceeds local demand; external purchasing power enters the trade area.

A positive retail gap (leakage) signals opportunity for new retail entrants. A negative retail gap (surplus) signals that existing businesses are drawing customers from outside the primary trade area, producing displaced sales.

== Significance in Commercial Real Estate ==
Displaced sales data informs site selection, market feasibility studies, and trade area delineation. Investors and developers use trade area surplus figures to assess whether a market can sustain additional retail development or whether existing supply is already over-serving local demand by attracting inbound consumers.

== See also ==
- Leakage (retail)
- Trade area
- Retail geography
- Market saturation
