= Beat Jans =

Swiss Federal Councillor since 2024

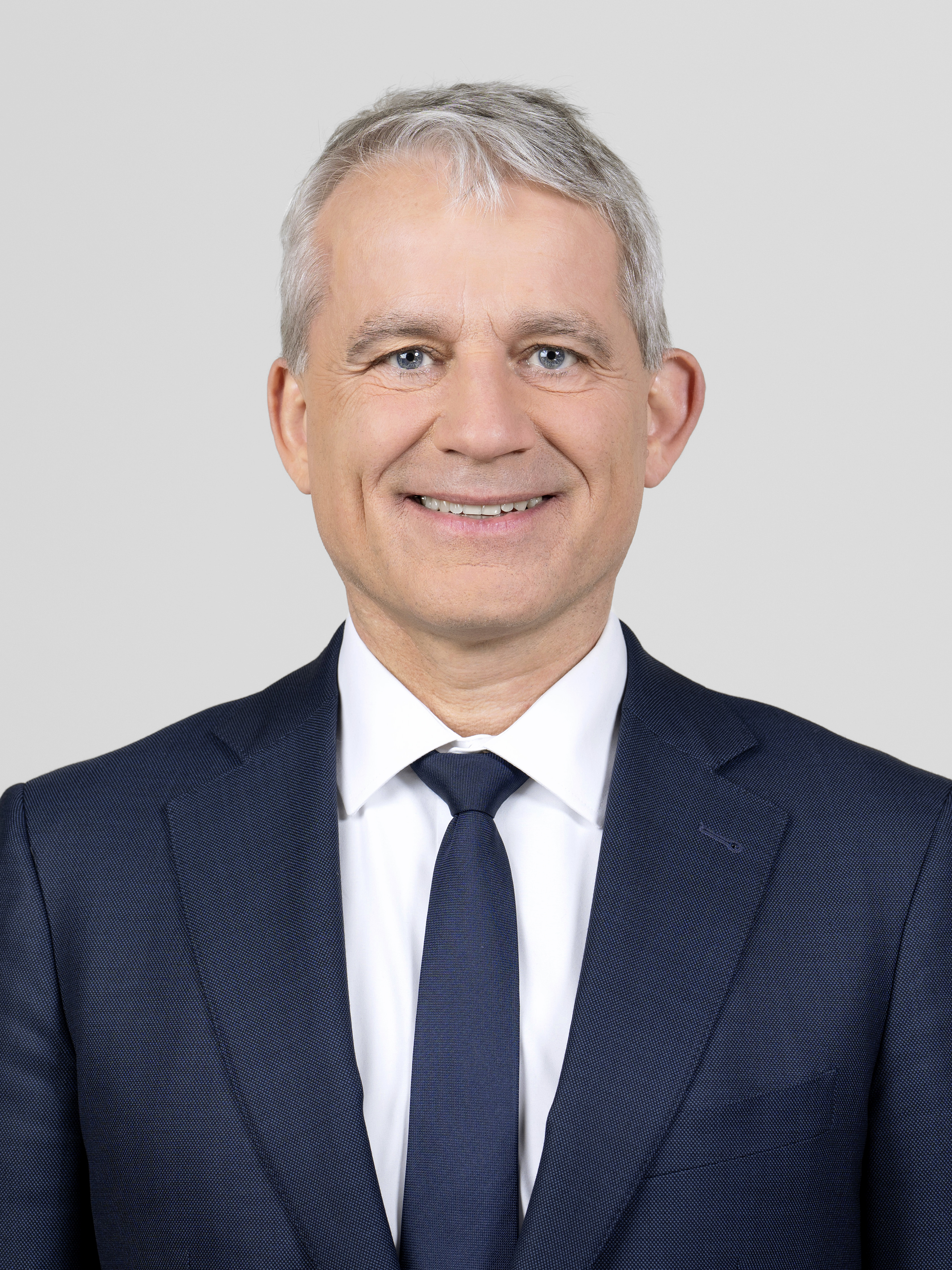
- Official portrait, 2026

Swiss Federal Councillor
- Incumbent
- Assumed office 1 January 2024
- Department: Justice and Police (2024–present)
- Preceded by: Alain Berset

President of Executive Council of Basel-Stadt
- In office 1 July 2021 – 14 December 2023
- Preceded by: Elisabeth Ackermann
- Succeeded by: Lukas Engelberger

Member of the National Council
- In office 31 May 2010 – 17 December 2020
- Preceded by: Rudolf Rechsteiner

Personal details
- Born: Beat Anton Jans; 12 July 1964 (age 62) Basel, Switzerland
- Party: Social Democratic Party
- Spouse: Tracy Renee Glass (m. 2004)
- Children: 2
- Education: ETH Zurich (Diploma)
- Website: Official website Parliament website

Beat Anton Jans (German pronunciation: [beːat jans]; born 12 July 1964) is a Swiss environmental scientist and politician who serves as a member of the Federal Council, after being elected in 2023 to succeed Alain Berset, assuming office on 1 January 2024. A member of the Social Democratic Party, he previously served on the National Council from 2010 to 2020, and as president of the Executive Council of Basel-Stadt from 2021 to 2023.

== Early life and education ==
Jans was born on 12 July 1964, in Basel, Switzerland, to Anton "Toni" Jans, a metalworker, and Maria Jans (née Ober), a sales associate. He was raised in a blue collar family living in the predominantly wealthy suburb of Riehen. His mother immigrated to Switzerland after World War II from Germany.

His paternal family originally hails from Gelfingen (presently part of Hitzkirch) on Lake Sempach in the Canton of Lucerne. In 1924, his grandfather took municipal citizenship, in nearby Mosen on Lake Hallwil, where his father was raised on a farm before moving to Riehen near Basel. His paternal grandfather, Josef Jans (1899–1968), served as the president of the municipal council of Mosen.

He completed his apprenticeship as a farmer in 1985 and followed up on his studies at the Technical College for Tropical Agriculture from where he graduated as an agricultural technician in 1987. He graduated in Environmental Sciences from the Swiss Federal Institute of Technology (ETH) in Zurich in 1994.

== Career ==
He was involved in the development projects of the Swiss Helvetas in Paraguay and Haiti between 1987 and 1989 and was a member of the board at Pro Natura between 2000 and 2010, when he resigned to assume office as a member of the National Council of Switzerland. From 2010 until 2015 he was a member of the board at ecos.

== Politics ==
Jans joined the SP in 1998 and became a member of the Grand Council of Basel Stadt in 2001. In the Grand Council, he was a member of the Commission of Economics and Taxes. He remained a member of the Grand Council after he joined the National Council of Switzerland in 2010 succeeding Ruedi Rechsteiner and only resigned in 2011. He was re-elected to the National Council in the federal elections in 2011, 2015 and 2019. In the National Council, he was also member of the Commission of Economics and Taxes. As it became clear that Anita Fetz would not stand for another term in the Council of States for Basel-Stadt, he put himself forward as a candidate, but later withdrew to enable a female candidate for the SP. He was again a candidate for the National Council and Eva Herzog for the Council of States. Both candidacies were successful in the October 2019 federal elections.

He was elected vice-president of the SP in 2015, succeeding Jaqueline Fehr, but resigned in 2015 when the party abolished the offices of the president and vice-president and instituted a co-presidency of Mattea Meyer and Cédric Wermuth.

He was elected into the Executive Council of Basel-Stadt on the 25 October 2020 and as its president in November 2020. Sarah Wyss of the SP succeeded him, after he resigned as a member of the National Council in December 2020.

== Federal Council of Switzerland ==
During the 2023 Swiss federal election he became an official candidate for Federal Council to succeed Alain Berset for the Social Democratic Party. The election was held on 13 December 2023 and he was the official nominee together with fellow politician Jon Pult. Three ballot rounds were required to determine the successor. During the second ballot round, Jans was ahead of his counter parties receiving 112 votes, opposing candidate Daniel Jositsch received 70 votes (presumably from the Swiss People's Party and The Liberals). He was ultimately elected to Federal Council during the third round of ballot. Jans assumed office on 1 January 2024.

== Political Profile ==
He gained a reputation as a unifier during his term as head of the Basel-Stadt Socialist Party, but he is considered very left-wing by his political opponents. He notably supported the federal popular initiative on responsible multinationals submitted to a vote in November 2020. As a federal councillor, he was sharply criticized for a controversial proposal to extend data retention, which critics fear will lead to disproportionate surveillance without legal basis.

== Personal life ==
On 11 June 2004, Jans married American-born Tracy Renee Glass (b. 1972), a biostatistician originally from Miami, Florida, whom he met while hiking in Hawaii. They had a long distance relationship for two years before she relocated to Basel to take a position at Novartis, a large pharmaceutical company. She currently works as team lead at Swiss Tropical and Public Health Institute. They have two daughters. His wife and his children are Swiss-American dual citizens.

Political offices
Preceded by Alain Berset	Member of the Swiss Federal Council; 2024–present	Incumbent
Preceded by Élisabeth Baume-Schneider	Head of the Department of Justice and Police; 2024–present	Incumbent
