= Journal of Economic Geography =

- Discipline: Economic geography
- Language: English
- Edited by: Harald Bathelt, Kristian Behrens, Neil Coe, William R. Kerr, Simona Iammarino

Publication details
- History: 2001–present
- Publisher: Oxford University Press
- Frequency: Bimonthly
- Open access: Hybrid
- Impact factor: 3.648 (2016)

Standard abbreviations
- ISO 4: J. Econ. Geogr.

Indexing
- ISSN: 1468-2702 (print); 1468-2710 (web)
- LCCN: 2001223256
- JSTOR: jecongeog
- OCLC no.: 47191782

Links
- Journal homepage; Online access; Online archive

The Journal of Economic Geography is a bimonthly peer-reviewed academic journal published by Oxford University Press covering all aspects of economic geography, including the intersection between economics and geography. The editors-in-chief are Harald Bathelt (University of Toronto), Kristian Behrens (Université du Québec à Montréal), Neil Coe (National University of Singapore), Simona Iammarino (London School of Economics and Gran Sasso Science Institute) and William R. Kerr (Harvard Business School).

== Abstracting and indexing ==
The journal is abstracted and indexed in:

- VINITI Database RAS
- Referativny Zhurnal
- Current Contents/Social and Behavioral Sciences
- EconLit
- Environmental Science and Pollution Management
- Geographical Abstracts
- Journal of Planning Literature
- ProQuest Business Research Databases
- Research Papers in Economics
- Social Science Research Network
- Social Sciences Citation Index

According to the Journal Citation Reports, the journal has a 2016 impact factor of 3.648.
