= Marco Kistler =

Swiss politician (born 1984)

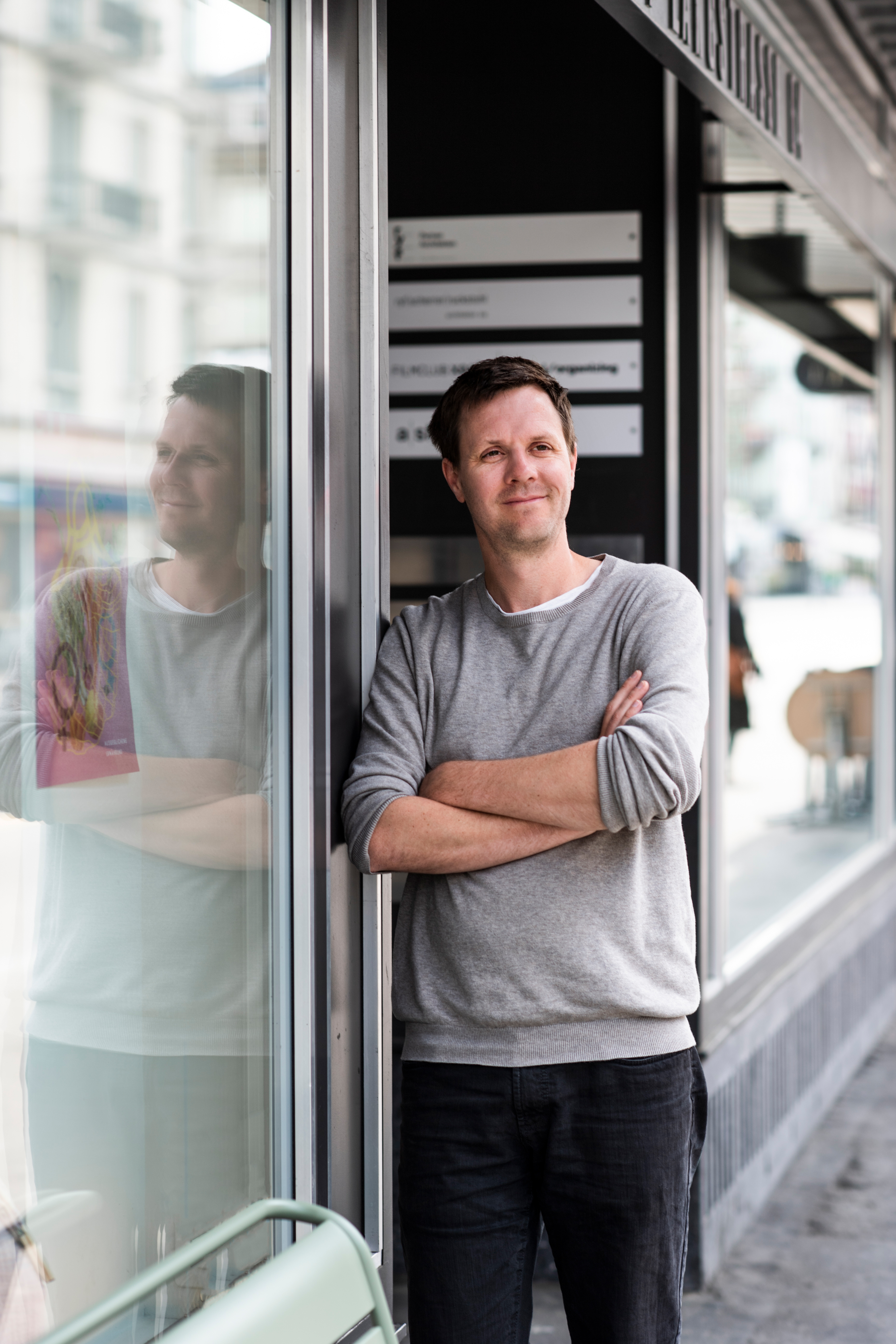
- Kistler in 2022

Member of the Landrat of Glarus
- In office 2012–2014

Personal details
- Born: Marco Kistler; 31 October 1984 (age 40); Oberurnen, Switzerland
- Domestic partner: Mattea Meyer (2016–)
- Children: 2
- Occupation: Campaigner, politician

Marco Kistler (Swiss Standard German pronunciation: [ˈmarko ˈkɪstlər]; born 31 October 1984) is a Swiss politician who served on the Landrat of Glarus for the Social Democratic Party between 2012 and 2014.

His 2013 political campaign featured the 1:12 – For Fair Wages initiative.

He has been in a relationship with Mattea Meyer, National Councillor and co-chair of the Social Democratic Party, since 2016. They have two children.
