= Vadim Krutetsky =

Vadim Andreyevich Krutetsky, also Krutetskii (Russian: Вадим Андреевич Крутецкий; December 1917 – September 15, 1991) was a Soviet psychologist who explored mathematical ability in gifted children. His most famous work is The Psychology of Mathematical Abilities in Schoolchildren (1968, Russian edition; 1976, English translation) in which he observed that mathematically capable children are typically striving "for the cleanest, simplest, shortest and thus most 'elegant' path to the goal" whereas average students pay little attention to aesthetics of their solutions. Krutetsky concluded that a "mathematical cast of mind" - a tendency to understand and connect the world mathematically - does exist and can be precisely discovered in gifted children. Mason & Johnston-Wilder (2004) write that this study "influenced generations of researchers" and Dowker (2005) calls it "the best-known study in the area".

Krutetsky was born in Moscow in December 1917. He graduated in 1941 with a degree in economic geography from Moscow State University, and received his Ph.D. in 1950 from the USSR Academy of Pedagogical Sciences in Moscow, where he remained for nearly thirty years, eventually becoming deputy director of the Research Institute of General and Educational Psychology.
