= Sarah Wyss =

Swiss politician (born 1988)

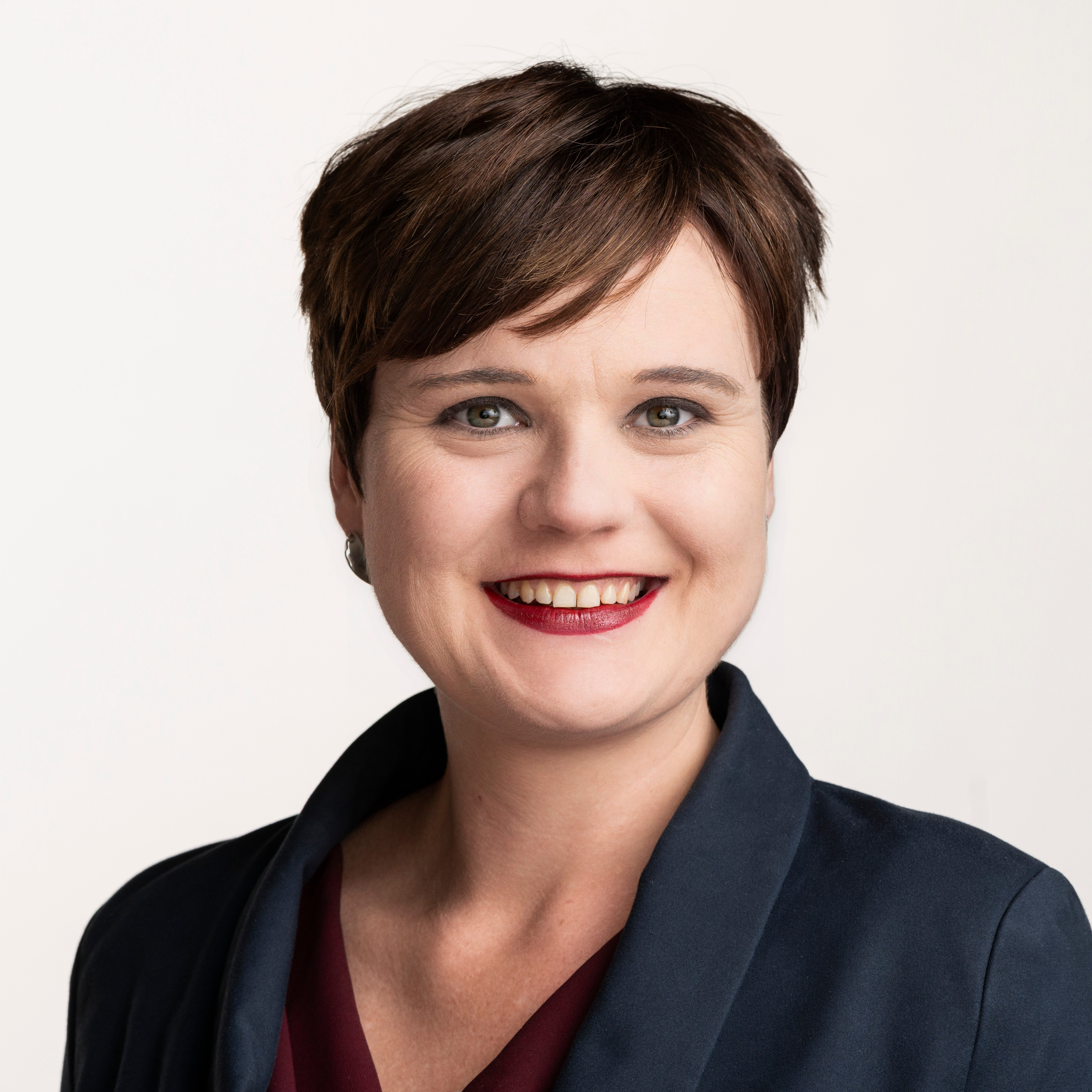

Member of the National Council of Switzerland
- Incumbent
- Assumed office December 2020

Personal details
- Born: Sarah Wyss; 3 August 1988 (age 37) Basel, Switzerland
- Party: SP

Sarah Wyss (born 3 August 1988) is a Swiss politician of the Social Democratic Party of Switzerland (SP). Since December 2020 she is a member of the National Council of Switzerland.

== Education and early life ==
She was born in Basel, but was raised in Münchenstein, Canton Basel-Landschaft. After initially having studied economic sciences and history, she earned a Master of Sciences in European Studies from the Europa Institute at the University of Basel in 2015.

== Political career ==
Her political career she began with the SP. She presided the cantonal youth wing of the SP, the Young Socialists of Canton Basel-Stadt between 2009 and 2012. In 2012, she was elected as a member of the Grand Council of Basel Stadt, a post she assumed in 2013 and was re-elected in 2016 and 2020. In November 2020, she announced she would not assume the post and succeed Beat Jans in the National Council instead.

=== Views ===
She focuses in health care politics and advocates for regional health care policies instead of cantonal ones.
