= Rudolf Rechsteiner =

Swiss politician

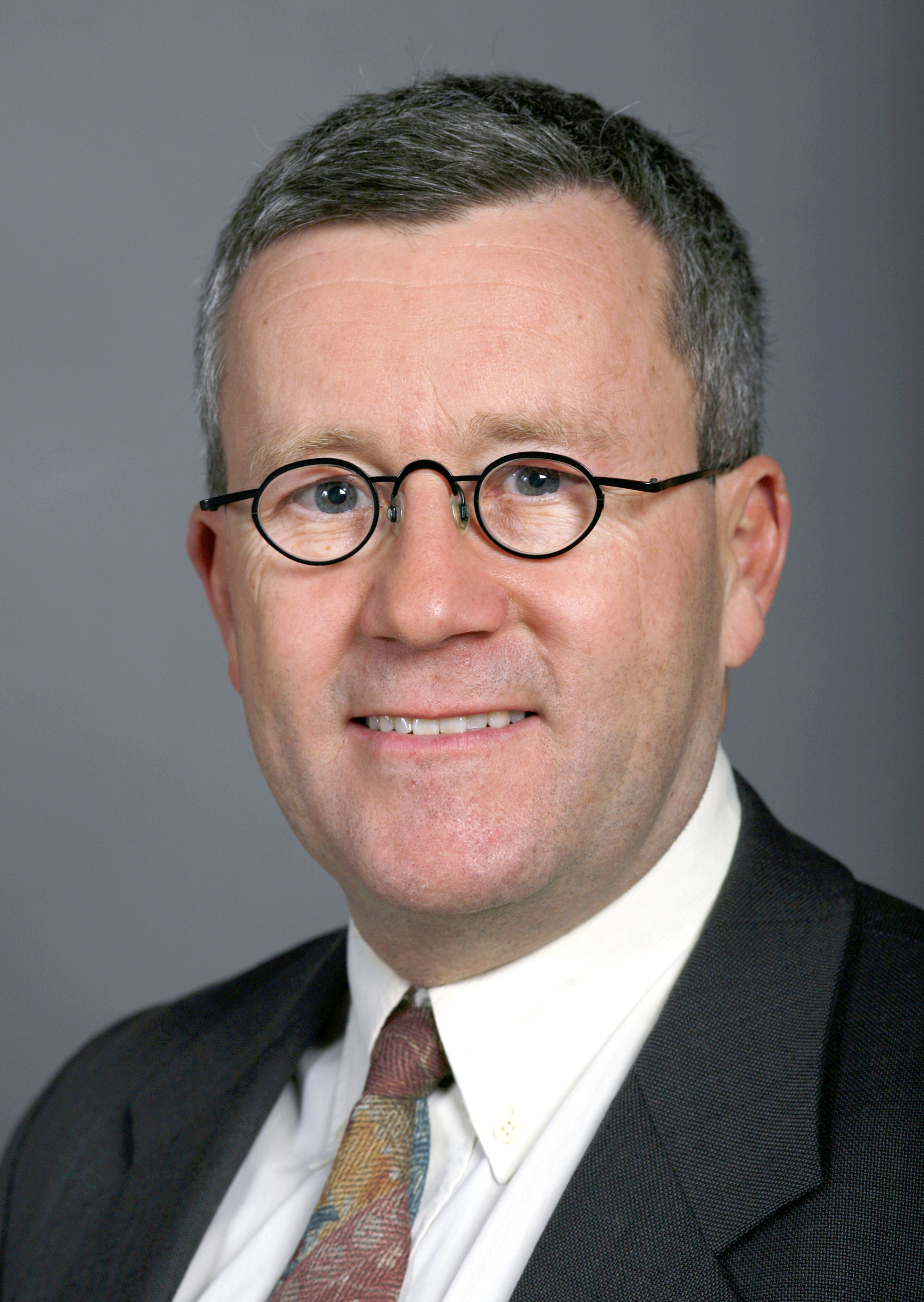
- Official portrait, 2007

Member of National Council (Switzerland)
- In office 4 December 1995 – 30 May 2010
- Succeeded by: Beat Jans
- Constituency: Canton of Basel-Stadt

Personal details
- Born: Rudolf Rechsteiner; 27 October 1958 (age 67) Basel, Switzerland
- Education: University of Basel (PhD)
- Occupation: Political scientist, politician
- Website: Official website Parliament website

Rudolf "Ruedi" Rechsteiner (born 27 October 1958) is a Swiss political scientist and politician who served on the National Council (Switzerland) for the Social Democratic Party from 1995 to 2010 before being succeeded by Beat Jans. He previously also served on the Grand Council of Basel-Stadt from 1988 to 1999. He was also president of Swissaid and the Swiss chapter of Amnesty International.
