= Bathelt =

Bathelt is a German surname. Notable people with the surname include:

- Hans Bathelt, German drummer, percussionist and lyricist
- Harald Bathelt (born 1960), German-Canadian geographer
