= Albert Steck =

Swiss politician

Albert Steck (19 December 1843 – 28 November 1899) was a Swiss politician and co-founder of the Social Democratic Party of Switzerland.

== Life ==
Albert Steck was son of Ludwig Franz Julius Steck, a member of the Bürgergemeinde of Bern and was a grandson of Johann Rudolf Steck (1772-1805), who served as the General Secretary of the Helvetic Republic in 1798/1799. From 1864 to 1870 he studied law in Bern, Heidelberg, and Leipzig. From 1876 to 1877, he was a civil servant in Bern.

In 1878, after the end of the national crisis which triggered the Swiss Kulturkampf, Steck was elected to the Grand Council of Canton Bern, which had been established by moderate conservatives. In spring 1882, he secured his re-election as part of the liberal left wing, Free-thinking party. Disappointed by the internal squabbling in the parliamentary party and suffering from health problems, Steck resigned in August 1883.

Subsequently, he met Alexander Reichel, the founder of the General Workers' Association of Bern and Surrounds, who introduced Steck to socialist ideas. In the context of late 19th century social democracy, Steck adopted a democratic reformist perspective. In 1886 he was one of the founders of the Swiss Strikers' Fund.

After Steck failed to win the Grütli Union over to his policies, he and Reichel founded a new social democratic party and began publish in the weekly periodical, The Swiss Social Democrat, which Steck edited, in 1888.

Steck had supported the efforts of Hermann Greulich in Zürich as early as 1870, but it was only on 21 October 1888 in Bern that Steck and Reichel attempted to form a national social democratic party, the Social Democratic Party of Switzerland (SP), out of the numerous Swiss regional workers' associations. In January 1889, Reichel was elected as the first party president, Steck as the vice-president and first party secretary. In 1891 he succeeded Reichel as party president, but was soon succeeded by Eugen Wullschleger. Steck lost influence in the SP after the Käfigturm riots in Bern in 1893, as the party became much more radical. He served in the Grand Council once more, as a representative of the party from 1892 to 1894.

Steck was married first to Anna Margaretha Manni, and then to Leonie Brodbeck, who was active in the Swiss women's labour movement.

== Bibliography ==
- Peter Bieler: Albert Steck 1843–1899 : Der Begründer der Sozialdemokratischen Partei der Schweiz. Olten: Hauenstein-Verl., 1960 (Zugl.: Bern, Univ., Diss., 1952)
- Beat Junker: Geschichte des Kantons Bern seit 1798, Bd. 3: Tradition und Aufbruch : 1881–1995 . Bern: Hist. Verein des Kantons Bern, 1996.
