= Ursula Koch =

Swiss politician

- Ursula Koch in 1986

Member of the National Council (Switzerland)
- In office 6 December 1999 – 10 May 2000
- Constituency: Canton of Zurich

President of the Social Democratic Party of Switzerland
- In office 28 January 1997 – 31 April 2000

Personal details
- Born: Ursula Pomeranz; 1 July 1941 (age 85) Zürich, Switzerland
- Education: University of Zürich (PhD); University of Oregon

Ursula Koch (German pronunciation: [ˈʊʁzula kɔx]; née Pomeranz; born 1 July 1941) is a former Swiss politician and was the first woman president of the Social Democratic Party of Switzerland (SP). She served briefly on the National Council (Switzerland) from 1999 to 2000.

== Early life ==
Koch was born Ursula Pomeranz on 1 July 1941 in Zurich, Switzerland to a stateless Jewish father originally from Poland and Swiss-born Maria Elisabeth Pomeranz (née Hanhart; 1914-2004).

She grew up in Stäfa on Lake Zürich and graduated from the teacher training college there before spending a year on exchange at the University of Oregon in 1962. In 1963, Ursula Koch started to study natural sciences at the University of Zürich and graduated at the Institute of Organic Chemistry, where she worked as a research assistant from 1970 to 1976. Ursula Koch received her doctorate in 1976.

== Political career ==
=== Cantonal Council and City Council of Zurich ===
As member of the Cantonal Council (Kantonsrat), the legislative assembly of the canton of Zürich, for the SP of the canton of Zürich, Ursula Koch refused, as dedicated woman's politician, the traditional male-oriented oath to the Vaterland and instead pledged allegiance on the Mutterland of office in 1979, but was re-elected until 1986.

Beginning in 1986, Ursula Koch was voted as member of the Zürich City Councillor (Stadtrat), the executive board of the city of Zürich. She acted as superintendent of the engineering department (Bauamt II or Hochbaudepartment), i.e. Ursula Koch was responsible for all building construction works in Zürich until 1998. Ursula Koch opposed intensively the opening of the former industrial zones for the construction of more commerce buildings, in favor of more accommodation buildings at moderate prizes; therefore her statement "City (of Zürich) is built" (in German: Die Stadt Zürich ist gebaut!) on 16 March 1988 to the members of the SIA association, the parent organization of Swiss engineers and architects, became her best-known saying.

At the 1999 national Council elections, Ursula Koch reached with 122,846 votes the second best result in Switzerland. Despite the top result, the inner-party disputes not declined. As Nationalrätin for the SP party, Ursula Koch was voted by the citizens of the canton Zürich as member of the Nationalrat, the Swiss lower parliament's house, from 6 December 1999 to 10 May 2000, when she resigned for reasons of health.

=== President of the Social Democratic Party of Switzerland (SP) ===
On 28 June 1997 Ursula Koch was elected by the members of the SP Switzerland at an extraordinary party congress in Thun, and won, despite lack of political experience at the national level, against Andrea Hämmerle, and succeeded the popular but controversy longyear SP president Peter Bodenmann. From 1997 to April 2000, Ursula Koch was the president of the SP, even being the first women president of the national section of the Swiss social democratic party (SP).

After her election as president of the party, Ursula Koch encountered massive rejection of their person, according to own information, and the conflict took place increasingly via media reaching its first peak in March 1998, when the general secretary Barbara Häring resigned. Party colleagues of the so-called "Bodenmann-Clan" (named after the previous party president) criticized an increasing lack of concept and the absence of the SP in the Swiss political arena. The crisis culminated after a closed-door meeting of the SP executive board on 19 February 2000: the reconciliation within the party leadership did not materialise, and on 15 April Ursula Koch retired by the party leadership and from the parliament for health reasons.

As president of the political party SP, and therefore member of the so-called Elefantenrunde – meaning the presidents of the five most 'important' political parties in Switzerland – Ursula Koch participated at the first live stream broadcast from the Federal Palace of Switzerland (Bundeshaus) in late 1999.

Since 2000, she is no more charged in a political office, and in November 2000 Ursula Koch married her long-time life partner.

== Publications ==
- Ursula Koch-Pomeranz: I. Photochemische Cyclisierung von Allyl-anisolen und C-Allyl-anilinen; II. Die durch Silberionen katalysierte Umlagerung von Propargyl-phenyläthern. Dissertation, 195 pages, Universität Zürich, 1976.
- Michael Kohn, Ursula Koch: Titanic oder Arche Noah. Gespräche zu Energie, Technik und Gesellschaft. Published by Patrizia N. Franchini and Suzanne Kappeler. Rauhreif-Verlag, Zürich 1987, ISBN 3-907764-07-2.
