= Christian Levrat =

Swiss politician

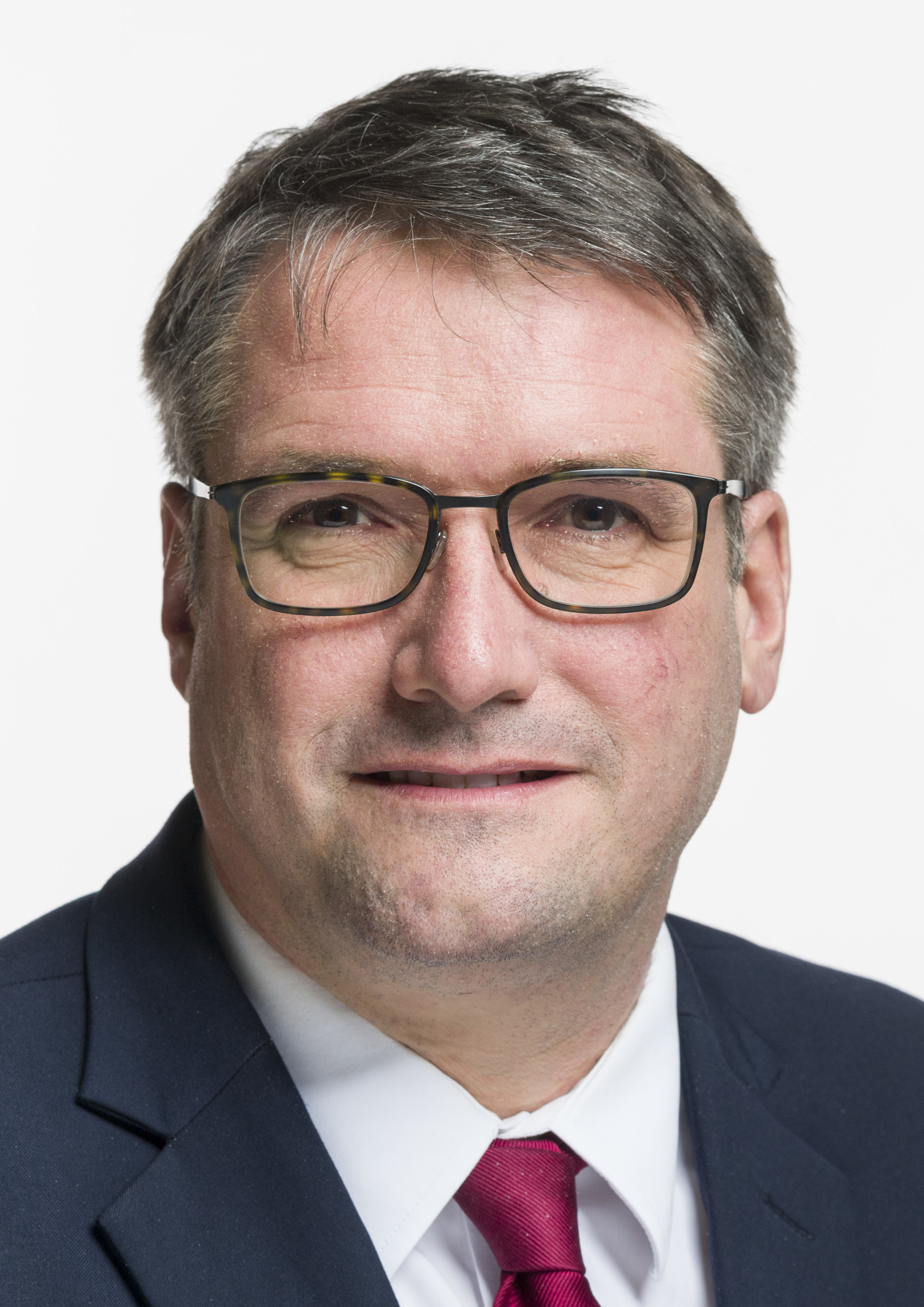
- Christian Levrat, in 2019

President of the Social Democratic Party of Switzerland
- In office 1 March 2008 – 18 October 2020
- Preceded by: Hans-Jürg Fehr
- Succeeded by: Cédric Wermuth; Mattea Meyer

Member of the Council of States
- Incumbent
- Assumed office 29 May 2012
- Preceded by: Alain Berset
- Constituency: Fribourg

Member of the National Council of Switzerland
- In office 1 December 2003 – 28 May 2012
- Succeeded by: Ursula Schneider
- Constituency: Fribourg

Personal details
- Born: 7 July 1970 (age 56) La Tour-de-Trême, Switzerland
- Party: Social Democratic Party of Switzerland
- Education: University of Fribourg; University of Leicester
- Profession: Labor lawyer/politician

Christian Levrat (born 7 July 1970) is a Swiss politician. He served as the President of the Social Democratic Party of Switzerland from 2008 until 2020. He has served as a member of the Council of States from Fribourg since 2012. Prior to the Council of states, He was a member of the National Council from 2003 to 2012. He became Chairman of the Board of Directors of Swiss Post in 2021.

Levrat was born in La Tour-de-Trême, now part of Bulle in the Canton of Fribourg. He earned a bilingual law degree from University of Fribourg and a master's degree at the University of Leicester.

He has citizenship in Pont (Veveyse), Le Crêt, Esmonts and Siviriez.

In 2008, he was elected as the President of the Social Democratic Party, succeeding Hans-Jürg Fehr, who resigned after a weak showing in the 2007 Swiss federal election. He led the party for 12 years and stepped down in October 2020 after the Cédric Wermuth and Mattea Meyer as Co-Presidents.

He was elected to the Council of States in 2012, taking 54.2 percent of the vote over Jacques Bourgeois of the FDP. The Liberals.
