= Peter Bodenmann =

Swiss politician

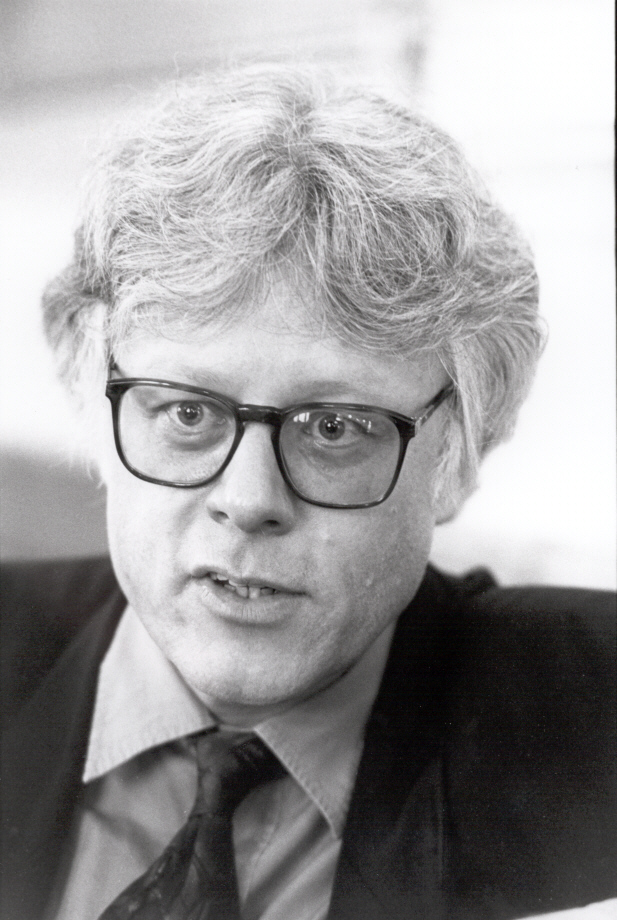
- Peter Bodenmann in 1994

Member of Parliament
- In office 1987–1997

President of the Social Democratic Party of Switzerland
- In office 1990–1997

Personal details
- Born: Peter Bodenmann; 30 March 1952 (age 74) Lax, Switzerland
- Party: Social Democratic Party of Switzerland

Peter Bodenmann (born, 30 March 1952) is a Swiss lawyer, entrepreneur and former member of the National Council for the Social Democratic Party of Switzerland (SP). He was the president of the SP between 1990 and 1997.

== Early life and education ==
He was born into a family with a political background in the Christian Democratic People's Party. After he graduated from the faculty of Law from the University of Zurich, he worked as an independent lawyer in Brig. Since his early years he was interested in leftwing politics and was one of the founders the political magazine Red Anneliese. In 1971 Peter Bodenmann co-founded the Critical Upper Valais movement as he was 24 years old, he became a local councilor of Brig-Glis. In 1982 he opened a law office in Brig and in the same year the movement Critical Upper Valais merged with the SP Upper Valais.

== Political career ==
In 1985 Bodenmann was elected into the Grand Council of Valais and by November 1987 into the National Council. Bodenmann was a member of the National Council until 1997. In 1990 he assumed as the president of the SP, succeeding Helmut Hubacher In 1997 he resigned as the president of the SP, and Ursula Koch became the first woman to be elected president of the SP. In the same year he was the first politician of the SP to be elected to the State Council of Canton Valais. In March 1999 he resigned from the State council of Canton Valais and was succeeded by Thomas Burgener (SP).

=== Political positions ===
During his tenure as the president of the SP, the party maintained clear leftwing politics and supported an eventual accession to the European Union and came first in the Federal elections of 1995. He was a main rival of Christoph Blocher of the Swiss People's Party (SVP) and advocated for sensitive framework conditions and for maintaining a competitive Euro exchange rate in Switzerland because of the export industry and tourism.

== Later activities ==
After leaving politics in 1999, he became the owner of a Hotel in Brig. He has also been writing columns on political and economic topics in the Weltwoche and has earned himself the nickname Oracle of Brig. Through his prominence as a former SP president and a political columnist, he maintained quite some influence in the politics of the SP. It was assumed that his political entourage supported Ursula Kochs reassignment of the presidency of the SP.
