= Mattea Meyer =

Swiss politician (born 1987)

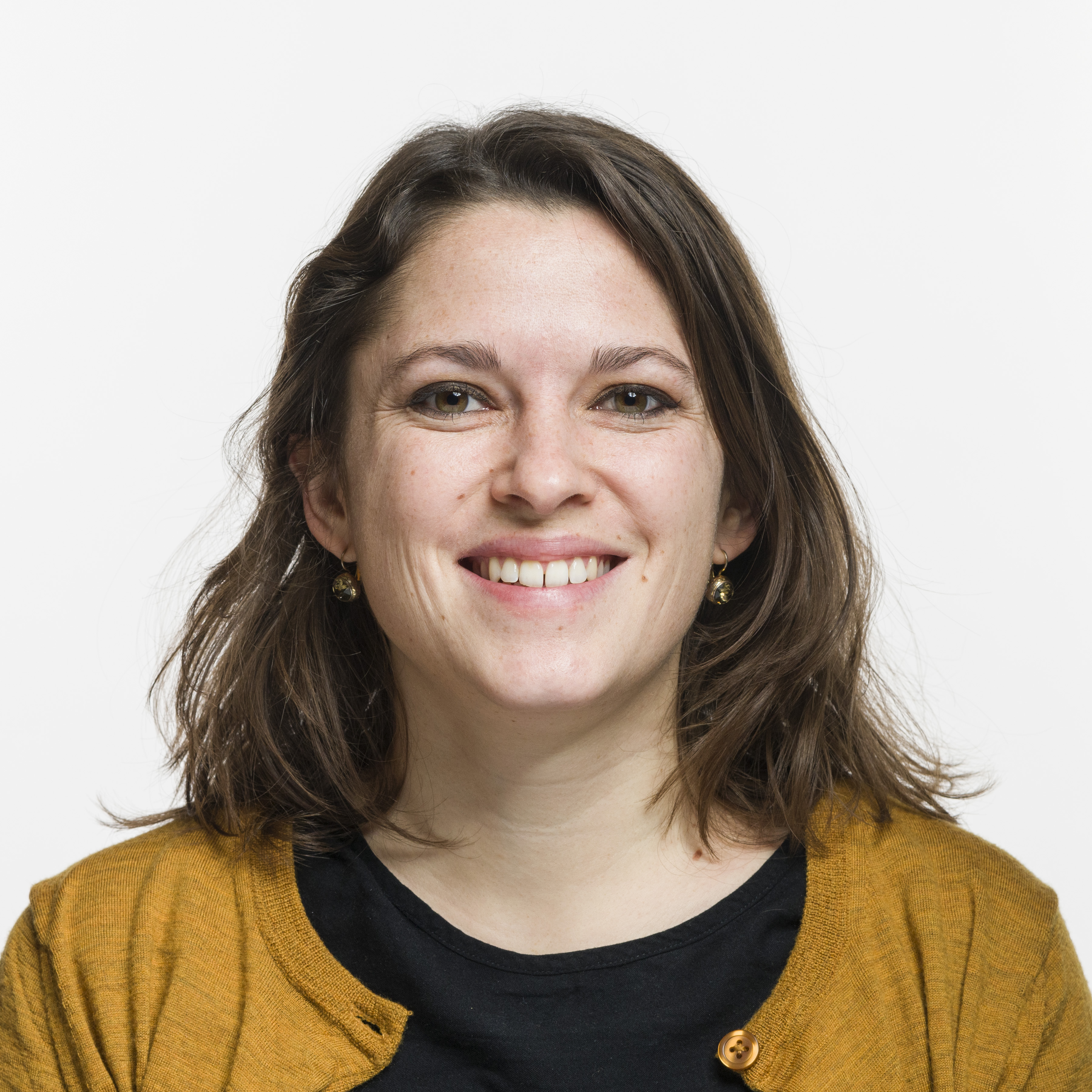
- Official portrait, 2019

Member of the National Council
- Incumbent
- Assumed office 30 November 2015
- Constituency: Canton of Zürich

Co-Chair of the Social Democratic Party of Switzerland
- Incumbent
- Assumed office 17 October 2020 Serving with Cédric Wermuth

Personal details
- Born: Mattea Julia Meyer; 9 November 1987 (age 38) Basel, Switzerland
- Domestic partner: Marco Kistler (2016–)
- Children: 2
- Education: University of Zurich (BA, MA)
- Website: Official website Parliament website

Mattea Julia Meyer (Swiss Standard German pronunciation: [maˈteːa ˈmaɪər]; born 9 November 1987) is a Swiss politician who currently serves as member of the National Council for the Social Democratic Party since 2015. Concurrently she co-chairs the Social Democratic Party of Switzerland together with Cédric Wermuth. Previously, Meyer served on the Cantonal Council of Zürich from 2011 to 2015.

== Early life and education ==
Meyer was born 9 November 1987 in Basel, Switzerland to an agricultural engineer father and a kindergarten teacher mother. She was raised, together with her sister and brother, in Rothenfluh and Winterthur.

She studied history, geography and political science at the University of Zurich between 2007 and 2015. She obtained a MSc in Human and Economic Geography from the University of Zurich in 2015. During her studies, she stayed for one semester at the University of Aix-Marseille where she experienced protests by the professors and students of the University.

== Political career ==
From 2009 to 2013 she was Vice-President of the Young Socialists of Switzerland. From 2011 to 2015 she was a member of the Grand Council of the Canton of Zurich. In 2015 she was re-elected in her constituency with the best result of her party, but in April 2015, the cantonal party nominated her as a candidate for the 2015 National Council elections. Since the 30 November 2015, she represents the SP in the National Council of Switzerland and resigned as a cantonal councilor. In her first legislature in the National Council she was a member of the Finance Commission and the Immunity Commission of the National Council. In the parliamentary elections in 2019, Meyer was re-elected as a national councilor. In her second legislature she took a seat in the commission for health and social security (SGK) and remained in the immunity commission. In December 2019 Meyer announced that together with Cédric Wermuth, she would be a candidate for the presidency of the SP Switzerland. Succeeding Christian Levrat, they were elected on 17 October 2020.

=== Political positions ===
Meyer is part of the party's majority anti-capitalist and left wing, with the PS representing a more left-wing social democracy when compared to other European social-democratic sister parties. She promotes a welcoming approach towards the asylum seekers which she sees as a normal answer for a country which exports weapons to war zones. During the COVID-19 pandemic she demanded that the Federal and Cantonal (provincial) Governments announce their measures in a coordinated manner. She defends the liberty of expression and assumed a godparenthood of the Belarusian political activist Anastasiya Mirontsava.

== Personal life ==
Mattea Meyer is the partner of fellow SP politician Marco Kistler. The couple have two children, a daughter born in 2017 and in 2021.
