= Geography of finance =

Branch of economic geography

The geography of finance (or financial geography) is a branch of economic geography that focuses on issues of financial globalization and the geographic patterns of finance. It studies the effects of state sovereignty, culture, and different kinds of barriers that affect the spatial distribution of finance, such as uneven development and financial exclusion, as well as the global and local connectivity of financial flows and networks. It also researches the creation of new financial centres around the world, both offshore and onshore.

== Geographical matters ==
With the continuing process of globalization, some geographic barriers, such as transportation costs of goods and capital, are steadily decreasing. However, many other kinds of geographic distance are still very present and relevant to explaining spatial differences. In the geography of finance, researchers analyse the effects of this distance on the distribution of the financial system across the world. Fields of research include culture and education, technology, the effects of tacit knowledge and relational proximity, and politics. An interesting issue in the latter is the increasing entanglement of banks and nations, which is closely related to the geography of networks. Furthermore, researchers analyse how and how strongly the current spatial distribution of finance affects the allocation of funds, capital, and credit across different regions.

== Financial matters ==
The relevance of economic geography is already quite established in the academic world, and research on the topic is in full progress. However, the geography of finance is now gaining individual focus, especially as the link between the financial economy and the real economy is losing strength. This is emphasized by the existence of economic bubbles and the fact that the value of financial transactions is often multiple times larger than the real economy.

== Recent developments ==
The September 11 attacks that targeted the World Trade Centre in New York City drew new attention to the geography of finance. Even though cities have more often been damaged by natural disasters or terrorist attacks, this attack was focused on the financial system and proved to have significant effects. The event led to a rethinking of the global geographical organization of the financial services industry and drew academic attention to the importance of such densely organized financial districts.

The 2008 financial crisis also led to interesting developments in the geography of finance. It drew new attention to the field, as the crisis showed that local events could cause a financial crisis that affected small businesses and local governments around the world. The relocation of financial services that had already been occurring was amplified by this crisis, decreasing the importance of major financial centers like Wall Street in lieu of relatively new financial centers elsewhere around the world.

== See also ==
- International Finance
- International Trade
- Location Theory
