= Journal of Transport Geography =

- Discipline: Transportation geography
- Language: English
- Edited by: Elizabeth C. Delmelle, Mark Zuidgeest

Publication details
- History: 1993-present
- Publisher: Elsevier
- Frequency: Quarterly
- Impact factor: 5.7 (2023)

Standard abbreviations
- ISO 4: J. Transp. Geogr.

Indexing
- ISSN: 0966-6923
- LCCN: 93640725
- OCLC no.: 28452206

Links
- Journal homepage; Online archive

The Journal of Transport Geography is a quarterly peer-reviewed academic journal published by Elsevier in association with the Transport Geography Research Group of the Royal Geographical Society (with the Institute of British Geographers). The journal was established in 1993 and covers all aspects of transportation geography. The editors-in-chief are Elizabeth C. Delmelle (University of Pennsylvania) and Mark Zuidgeest (University of Cape Town). The founding editor is Richard Knowles (University of Salford).

== Abstracting and indexing ==
This journal is abstracted and indexed in Scopus, the Social Sciences Citation Index, and GEOBASE. According to the Journal Citation Reports, the journal has a 2023 impact factor of 5.7.
