= Transport geography =

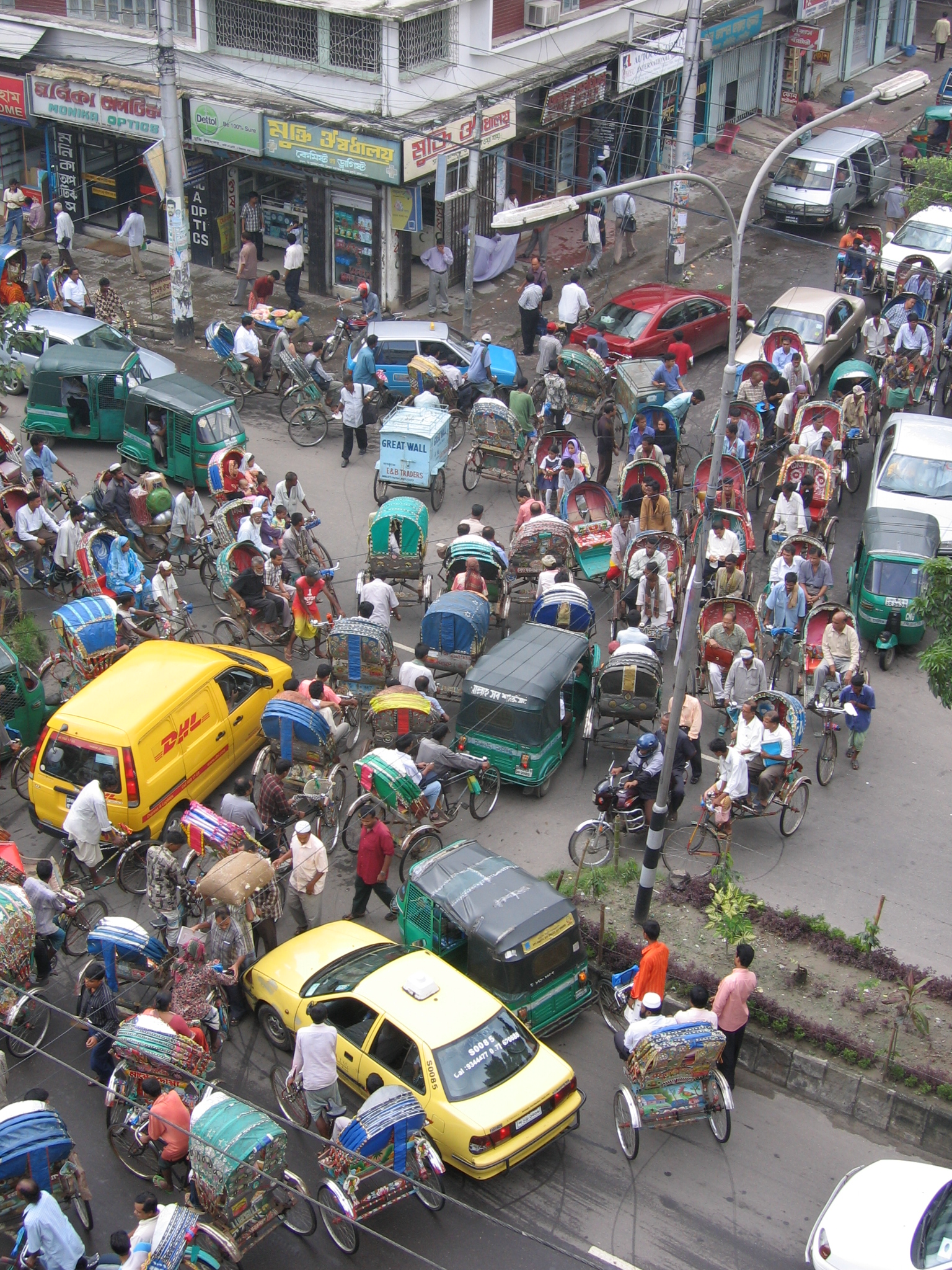
Spatial interaction in Dhaka

Transport geography or transportation geography is a branch of geography that investigates the movement and connections between people, goods and information on the Earth's surface.

== Aims and scope ==
Transportation geography detects, describes, and explains the Earth's surface's transportation spaces regarding location, substance, form, function, and genesis. It also investigates the effects of transportation on land use, on the physical material patterns at the surface of the earth known as 'cover patterns', and on other spatial processes such as environmental alterations. Moreover, it contributes to transport, urban, and regional planning.

Transportation is fundamental to the economic activity of exchange. Therefore, transport geography and economic geography are largely interrelated. At the most basic level, humans move and thus interact with each other by walking, but transportation geography typically studies more complex regional or global systems of transportation that include multiple interconnected modes like public transit, personal cars, bicycles, freight railroads, the Internet, airplanes and more. Such systems are increasingly urban in character. Thus, transport and urban geography are closely intertwined. Cities are very much shaped, indeed created, by the types of exchange and interaction facilitated by movement. Increasingly since the 19th century, transportation is seen as a way cities, countries or firms compete with each other in a variety of spaces and contexts.

== Transportation modes ==
In terms of transport modes, the primary forms are air, road, water, and rail. Each form has its own cost associated with 'speed of movement', which is affected by friction, place of origin, and destination. Ships are generally used for moving large amounts of goods. Maritime shipping is able to carry more around the world at a cheaper cost. For moving people who prefer to minimize travel time and maximize comfort and convenience, road and air are the most common modes in use. A railroad is often used to transport goods in areas away from water. Railroads may also be the source of transportation for people as well.

" Transportation modes are an essential component of transport systems since they are the means by which mobility is supported. Geographers consider a wide range of modes that may be grouped into three broad categories based on the medium they exploit: land, water and air. Each mode has its own requirements and features, and is adapted to serve the specific demands of freight and passenger traffic. This gives rise to marked differences in the ways the modes are deployed and used in different parts of the world. Recently, there is a trend towards integrating the modes through intermodality and linking the modes ever more closely into production and distribution activities. At the same time; however, passenger and freight activity is becoming increasingly separated across most modes."

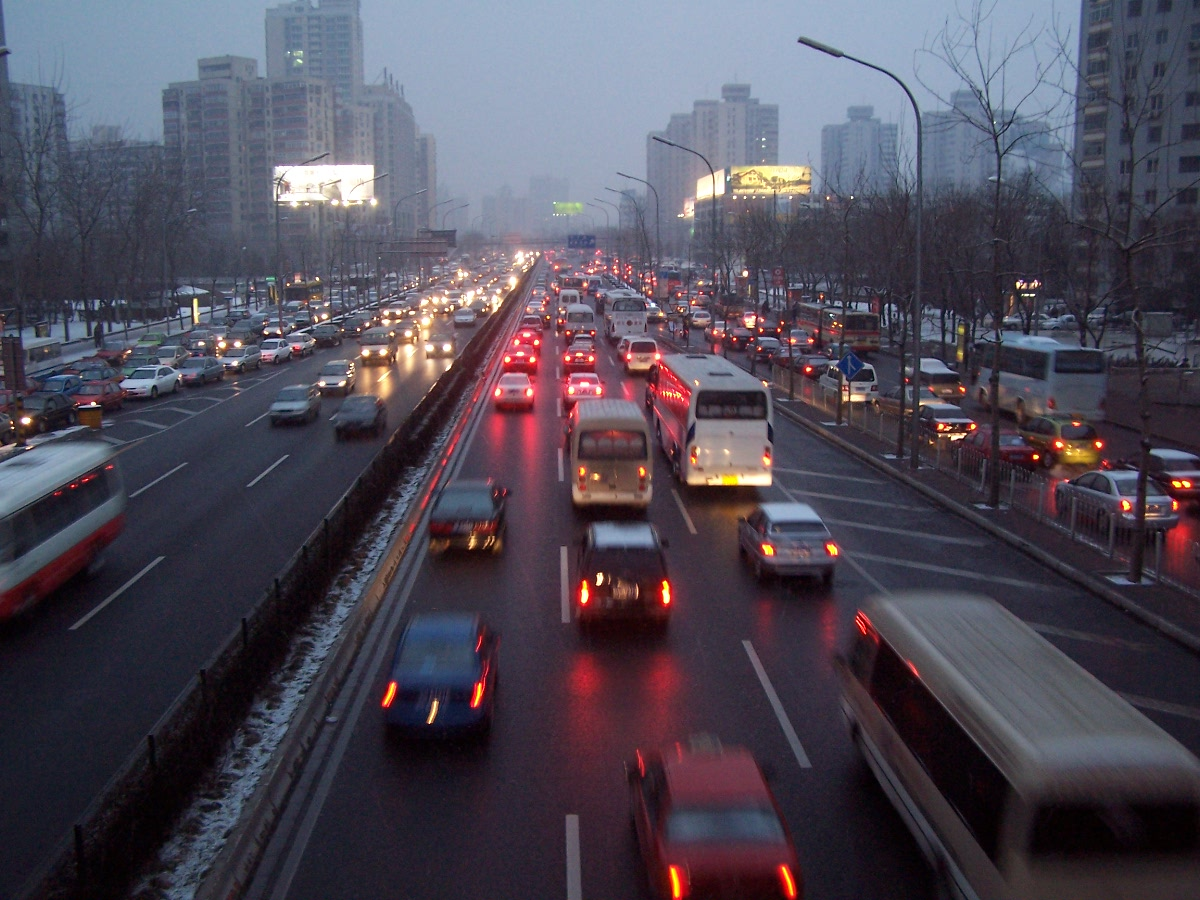
Beijing traffic jam.

=== Road transportation ===
Road transportation networks are connected with movements on constructed roads; carrying people and goods from one place to another by means of lorries, cars, etc. Transportation may be further categorized by the vehicle used or the purpose for transport itself.

=== Maritime transportation ===
Water transportation is the slowest form of transportation in the movement of goods and people. Strategic chokepoints around the world have continued to play significant roles in maritime industry. Although the slowest form of transportation compared to road and rail transport, it is the most cost effective.

=== Rail Transportation ===
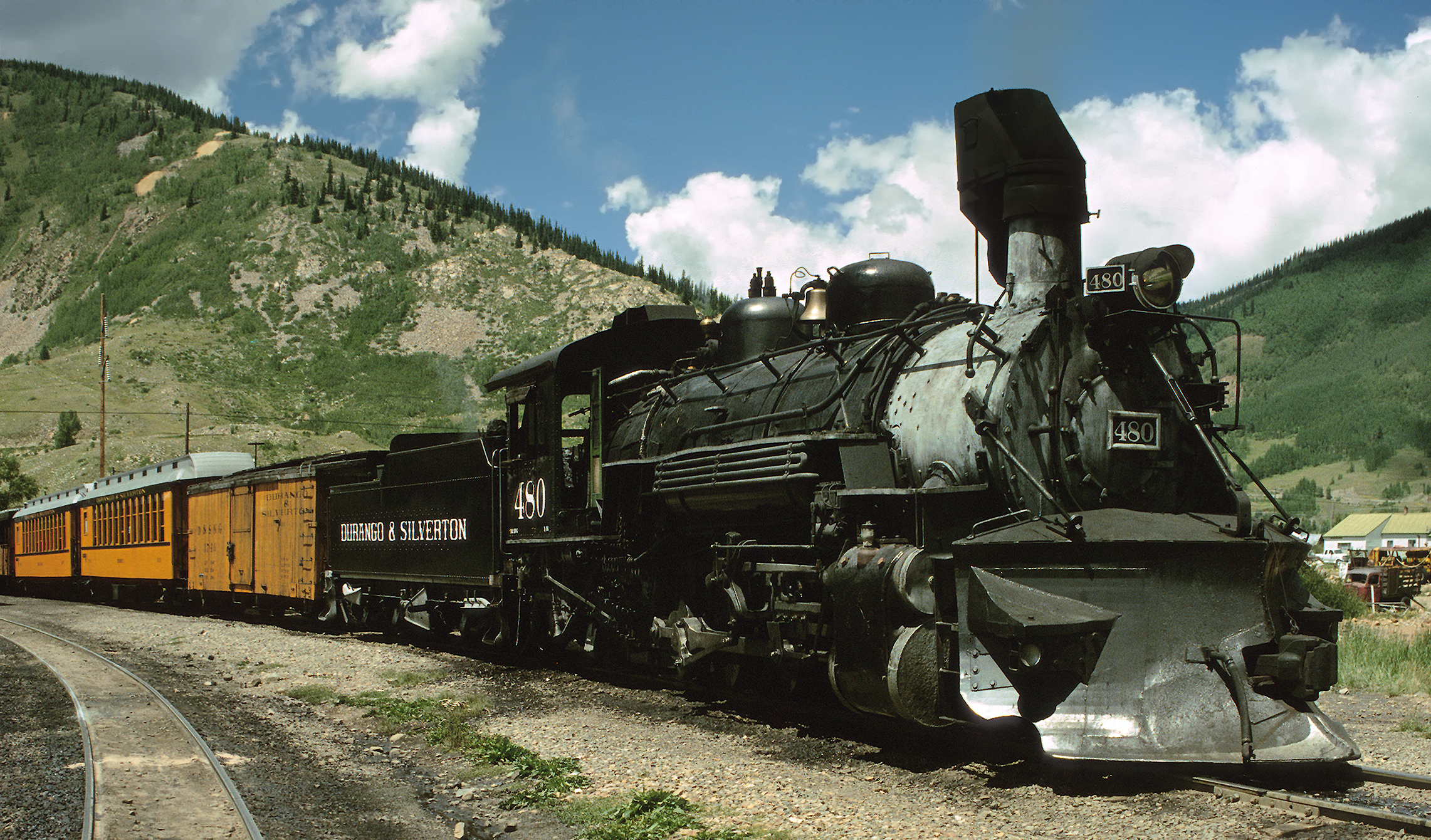

Rail transportation is the movement of cargo, goods, and passengers on trains as a form of transportation. Transportation by rails has been established as one of the safest modes of transportation over time.

== Challenges for transportation ==
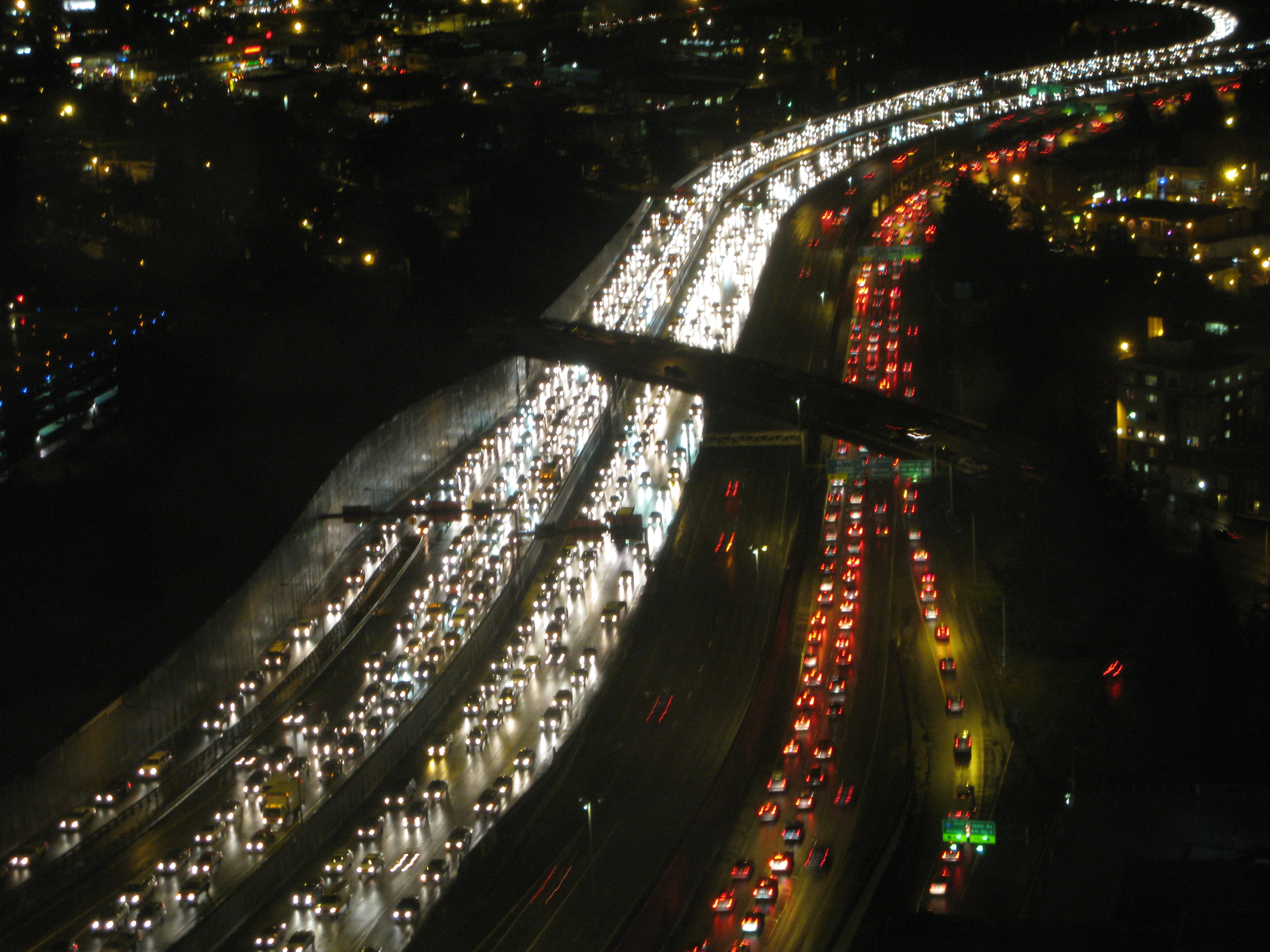
Seattle traffic at I-5 and Yesler Way

Transportation availability on existing streets, highways, and rail facilities no longer match the transportation demands created by subsequent population growth and new location patterns of economic activity. Besides an increase in population, another problem is vehicles overloading the network of highways and arterial streets. See Traffic congestion, Transportation network, and Population densities

The well-being of poor people and people who live in developing areas can be threatened by systems of transportation that fail to connect them to jobs and medical assistance. For example, areas of Southern California have transportation systems that do not connect the homeless to these necessities. See Environmental Justice.

== See also ==
- Concepts and Techniques in Modern Geography
- Economics
- Geographic mobility
- Human geography
- Journal of Transport Geography
- Street reclamation – Changing streets to focus on non-car use
- Tobler's first law of geography
- Tobler's second law of geography
- Transport
