= Theoretical economic geography =

Theoretical economic geography is a branch of economic geography concerned with understanding the spatial distribution of economic activity.

Theoretical techniques in this branch of economics explain a number of phenomena such as:

- The clustering of people and businesses into cities.
- The location of major population centers, which is often based on proximity to trade routes. For example, most major cities are located on harbours.
- The distribution of people and businesses within cities with higher density in the centres, reducing to lower density on the fringes.
- The distribution of populations across land masses, with major cities, interspersed with regional centres which are in turn interspersed with smaller towns.
- The clustering of similar businesses together.
