= Hans-Jürg Fehr =

Swiss politician

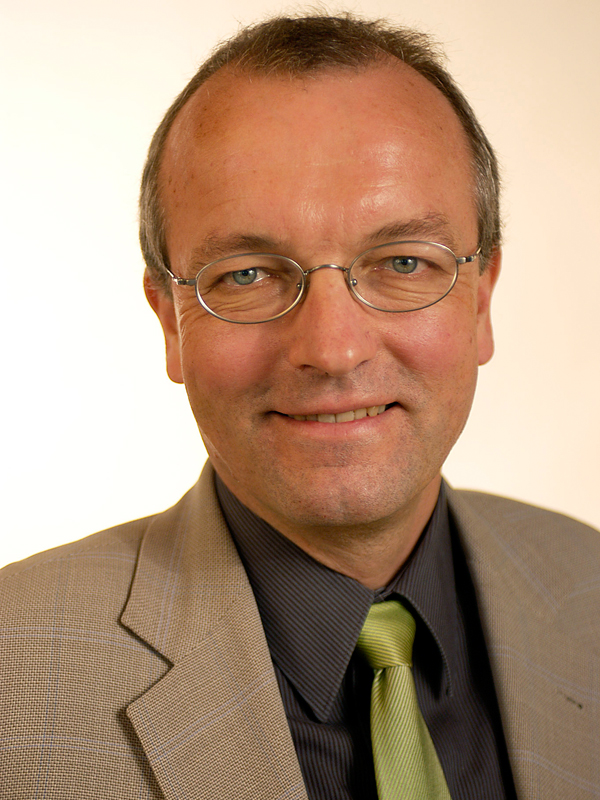
Hans-Jürg Fehr

Hans-Jürg Fehr (born 1948) is a Swiss politician and was from 2004–2008 the president of the Social Democratic Party of Switzerland. He was succeeded by Christian Levrat.

On 26 October 2007, following the losses at the general elections, Fehr resigned in March 2008.

He is not to be confused with Hans Fehr, member of the Swiss People's Party.
