= Vreni Schawalder =

Swiss politician and crossword compiler

Member of the Executive Council of Thurgau
- In office 1 June 1996 – January 2000

Member of the Grand Council of Thurgau
- In office 1988–1996

Member of the municipal executive of Romanshorn
- In office 1991–1996

Personal details
- Born: Verena Linder; February 3, 1946 (age 80) Frauenfeld, Switzerland
- Citizenship: Swiss
- Party: Social Democratic Party of Switzerland
- Profession: Teacher

Vreni Schawalder (born 3 February 1946 in Frauenfeld, originally from Widnau) is a Swiss politician of the Social Democratic Party of Switzerland.

She was the first woman elected to the Executive Council of Thurgau, where she headed the Department of Public Education and Culture from 1996 to 2000.

She is also known as a crossword compiler.

== Biography ==
=== Early life and family ===
Vreni Schawalder was born Vreni Linder on February 3, 1946 in Frauenfeld, in the canton of Thurgau. She is originally from Widnau, in the canton of St. Gallen. She has four siblings.

Her father, Karl Linder, was a Radical member of the Grand Council of Thurgau and operated a carpentry business in Münchwilen together with his wife, Lilly Bommeli.

Since 1968, she has been married to Walter Schawalder, a schoolteacher, with whom she has three children.

=== Education and professional career ===
After completing her primary and secondary education in Münchwilen from 1953 to 1962, Schawalder enrolled at the normal school in Kreuzlingen. She graduated in 1967 after completing a one-year teaching placement at the primary school in Tuttwil.

She worked as a primary school teacher in Sankt Margarethen until the birth of her first child in 1969, after which she regularly worked as a substitute teacher in various schools until 1991.

She also worked as a freelance journalist, writing opinion columns for the Thurgauer Tagblatt and the Thurgauer Volksfreund. Known for her crossword puzzles, published notably in the NZZ am Sonntag and the Thurgauer Zeitung from 2001 to 2009, she also published in 2003, as part of the Beobachter advice series, a guide to founding and managing associations, which was reissued several times through 2013.

=== Political career ===
After joining the Social Democratic Party of Switzerland in 1976, Schawalder was active in the party's Romanshorn branch until 1996, serving as its interim chair from 1991 to 1993, and was also involved in the local Socialist women's group.

She was a member of the Grand Council of Thurgau from 1988 to 1996 and served as its president in 1994–1995. At the same time, she was a member of the municipal executive of Romanshorn from 1991 to 1996.

On 10 March 1996, she became the first woman elected to the Executive Council of Thurgau. She headed the Department of Public Education and Culture, where she was responsible in particular for the new regulations governing the Matura and the reform of the financing system for primary schools.

After falling seriously ill in November 1999 and announcing upon her return to office that she would not seek another term in the following March's elections, she suffered a relapse and resigned with immediate effect in January 2000 for health reasons.

=== Voluntary and community activities ===
Schawalder helped organize the Meals on Wheels service in Romanshorn and served as head of the transport service of the Swiss Red Cross from 1976 until the early 1980s.

The mother of a daughter born with a disability, she was the founding president of the Upper Thurgau Association of Parents and Friends of People with Intellectual Disabilities (Insieme Thurgau), serving from 1980 to 1993. From 1994 to 1996, she was also a member of the expert commission responsible for reviewing the situation of people with disabilities in the Canton of Thurgau.

From 1993 to 2006, she founded and chaired the Lake Constance and Rhine regional committee of the relief campaign for Sombor, Serbia. She was also a member of the board of the Frauenarchiv Thurgau (Thurgau Women's Archive) from 2001 to 2009. In addition, she served as president of the Feines Kino Romanshorn association, which operates the Roxy Cinema in Romanshorn, from 2013 to 2019.
