= Kristian Behrens =

Canadian economist

Kristian Behrens is a Canadian economist, currently a Full Professor and Canada Research Chair at Université du Québec à Montréal.
