= Retail geography =

Study of retail stores placement

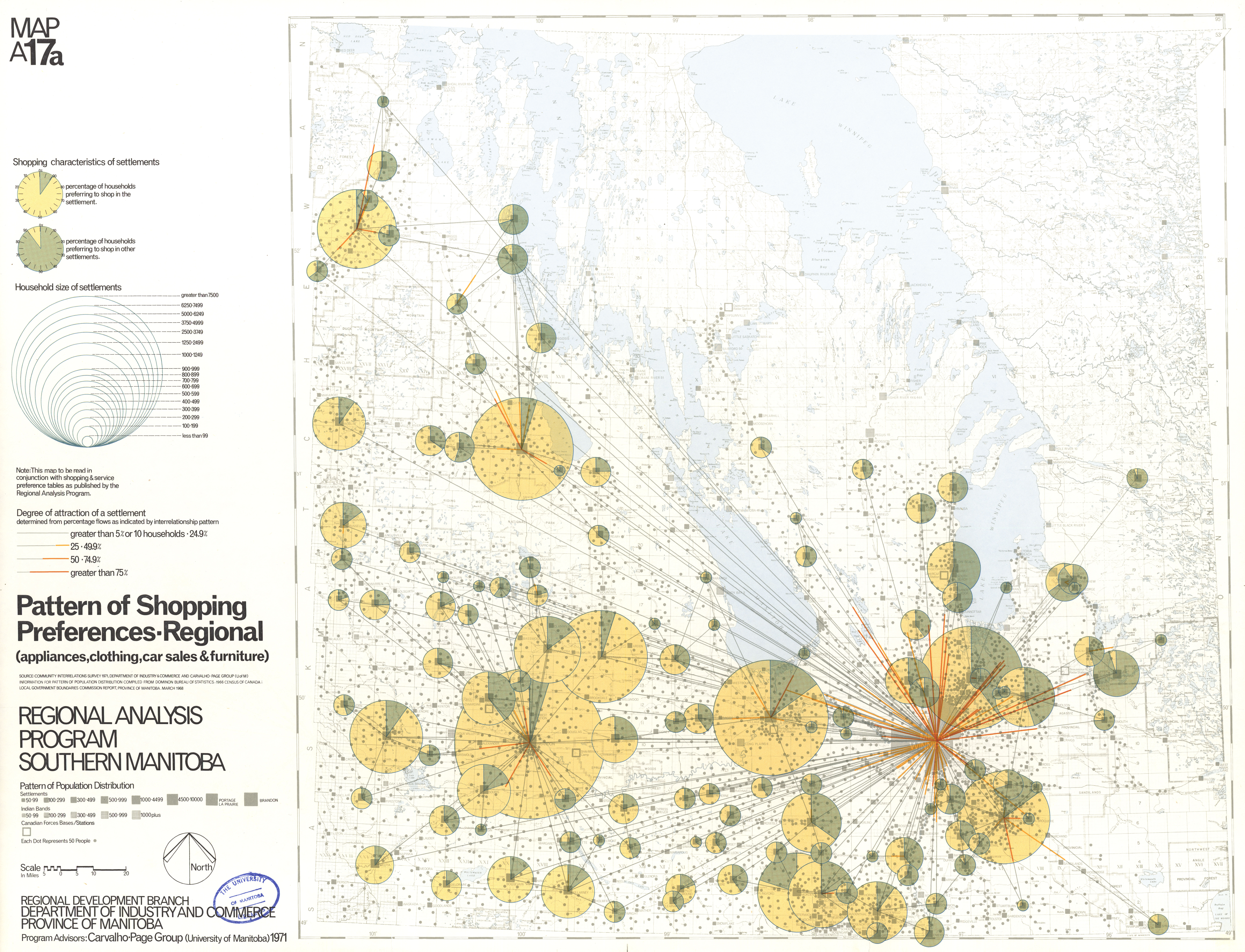
Map of shopping preferences in Manitoba in 1972

Retail geography is the study of where to place retail stores based on where their customers are. The use of retail geography has grown significantly in the 2000s as a result of the use of geographic information systems (GIS). It first emerged in the United States in the 1960s. In the 1990s, the "new retail geography" emerged.

== Related Research Books ==
- John Alan Dawson, 1980, Retail Geography, London: Croom Helm.
- Mark Birkin; Graham Clarke; Martin P. Clarke (14 June 2002). Retail Geography and Intelligent Network Planning. John Wiley & Sons.

== See also ==
- Marketing geography
- Geomarketing
- Economic geography
- Business geography
