= Cédric Wermuth =

Swiss politician (born 1986)

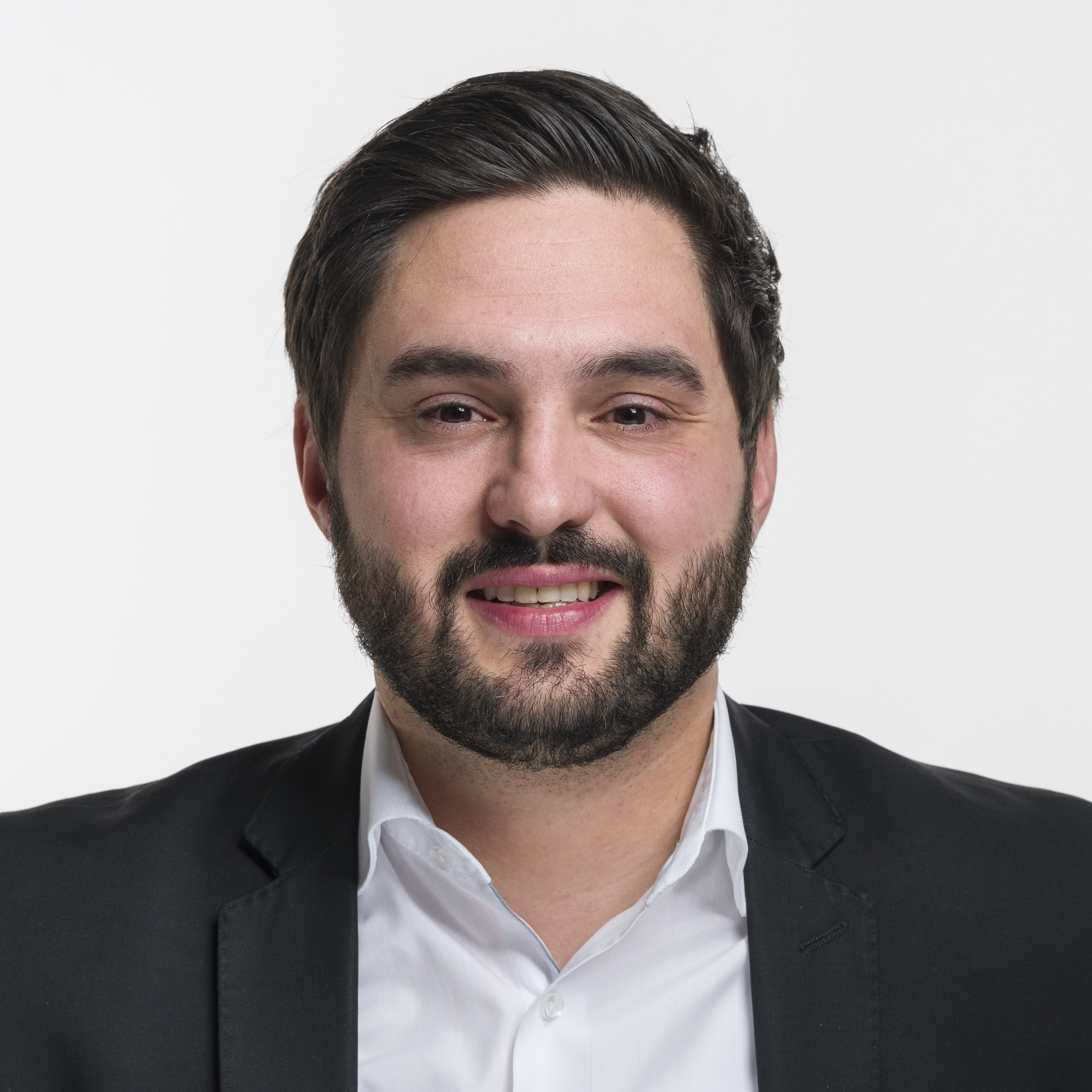
- Official portrait, 2019

Member of National Council (Switzerland)
- Incumbent
- Assumed office 5 December 2015
- Constituency: Canton of Aargau

Co-Chair of Social Democratic Party of Switzerland
- Incumbent
- Assumed office 17 October 2020 Serving with Mattea Meyer

Personal details
- Born: Cédric Wermuth; 19 February 1986 (age 40) Jegenstorf, Switzerland
- Citizenship: Switzerland; Italy
- Party: Social Democratic Party of Switzerland
- Spouse: Anja Pfenninger (m. 2015)
- Children: 2
- Education: University of Zurich (Licentiate, MA)
- Website: Official website Parliament website

Cédric Wermuth (German pronunciation: [ˈseːdrɪk ˈvɛʁmuːt]; born 19 February 1986) is a Swiss politician who currently serves on the National Council for the Social Democratic Party of Switzerland since 2011. He currently also serves as co-president of the Social Democratic Party of Switzerland (SP) along with Mattea Meyer. He has formerly served as president of the Young Socialists of Switzerland (JUSO) and also a former vice president of the SP.

== Early life and education ==
Wermuth was born 19 February 1986 in Jegenstorf, Switzerland, the older of two sons, to Otto Wermuth, a special education teacher, and Laurence Wermuth (née Dind; 1953–2014). He has a younger brother Yann Wermuth (born 1989).

His paternal family originally was from Eggiwil. He had an italian-born grandmother from the German-speaking Trentino Alto Adige region who fled Fascism during World War II and came to Switzerland. Wermuth was raised partially in Stetten, Lenzburg, Bünzen, Boswil, Baden, and Freiamt. His upbringing included living on farms.

Cedric Wermuth graduated from high school in Wohlen and attended the University of Zürich, where he studied political science, history, economics, and philosophy. He has a Licentiate/Master of Arts degree.

== Political career ==
He became a member of the Young Socialists of Switzerland (JUSO) at age thirteen and Wermuth's active involvement in politics began when he was fifteen. He wrote a letter to the editor criticizing one of the newspaper's authors for deemphasizing right-wing politics in their town. He received a number of threatening and critical phone calls from readers; his parents struggled to protect him without sheltering him.

In the mid-2000s, he became "really politicized" by his interactions with neo-Nazi groups at his school and worked hard to uproot anti-Semitic conspiracy theories such as those presented in The Protocols of the Elders of Zion. He became JUSO's central secretary in 2005, and served as its president between 2008 and 2011. In 2010 he was sentenced to a fine for trespassing after having taken part in a squat of a hotel in Baden in 2009. During this time, he worked as a personal assistant to Urs Hofmann; and in development cooperation for Solidar Suisse. He served on the Baden Residents' Council from 2010 to 2011. In 2011, just months after resigning as president of JUSO, he joined the National Council as a member of the Finance Commission and the president of a finance sub-committee. Shortly after, he was elected as the vice president of the Federal Assembly's SP. In 2015, he moved to the State Politician Commission and the Business Audit Commission, where he served until 2019 and 2020. He was also elected vice president of the SP Parliamentary Group in the Federal Assembly during this time. He was a candidate for the Swiss Council of States for the Canton Aargau in the Federal Elections of October 2019, but was not elected. But during the same election he was also a candidate for the National Council, for which he was re-elected. As of 2021, he is in his third legislative term and part of the Economic and Taxes Commission. He also consults for Spinas Civil Voices, a civil rights organization in Zürich.

He and Mattea Meyer were elected co-presidents of the SP in 2020 as Christian Levrat stepped down. They received 96% of the vote. In the following months, opponents of the SP labeled Wermuth quiet and uninterested as opposed to Meyer, who they thought had more presence. In response, he criticized them for assuming she would be doing the secretarial work while he served as the face of their presidency. He also pointed out that Meyer was asked questions about work/family balance during their campaign while he was not, and how her hate mail and criticism often contains sexual violence threats unlike his.

He values working with many different personalities and ideologies. Despite not agreeing politically, he and Thierry Burkart, who also represents Aargau, established the Mittelland Rail Link Committee, which aims to improve transportation in the canton. He also collaborates with those within his party; he co-wrote Die Service-Public-Revolution, published in 2020, with author Beat Ringger and is currently writing a book with Mattea Meyer.

== Political positions ==
Wermuth espouses left-wing politics and wants the SP to be more radical. While the SP's opponents call them the "Prohibition Party" due to the constraints they aim to put on corporations, Wermuth and Meyer want it to be known as the "Freedom Party".

=== Climate change ===
Wermuth and his family live in a housing co-op, share a car with other families, and buy vegetables directly from the source to lower their footprint. He regards climate change as a class issue and wants to increase non-profit housing construction and expand solar energy both to save the environment and to improve quality of life for impoverished families. He thinks Switzerland should participate in the Green New Deal and that private car and plane travel should be decreased across the board. He finds the "moral thinking" that all people are responsible for global warming "fundamentally wrong" because corporations did and continue to do the most damage.

For the World Wide Fund for Nature's 2012 Earth Hour, he bet the people of Switzerland that if he could get 200 people to ride their bikes more often, he would clean their bikes. In the end, he cleaned only a few, but considers it a success nonetheless.

=== COVID-19 ===
Wermuth thinks that, like a lot of other countries, Switzerland could have dealt with the emergence of COVID-19 more effectively. While he does not personally like COVID passports, he believes everyone must do their part to quash the virus and thus voted in favor of the COVID-19 Act. He does think, however, that vaccines are the most effective method to end the pandemic and that this should be the main focus.

=== Drug legalization ===
In 2008, he smoked a joint while discussing cannabis legalization during a National Council meeting to demonstrate his support of decriminalizing it.

=== Economics ===
Capitalism and corporate greed are among Wermuth's main focuses. He believes capitalism is unjust and treated like a religion by many people, particularly the wealthy. He was a staunch supporter of the 99% Initiative, which aimed to increase wealth redistribution by increasing taxes on capital gain. He does not believe that companies, corporations, and the wealthy are being taxed enough, and that this is unconstitutional because the Constitution calls for "taxation based on economic performance." He believes in salary caps—the highest salary should be no more than 12x the lowest salary in the company across all levels—and a minimum wage, which currently does not exist in Switzerland. He thinks that the rich protest against these equalizing values by threatening to create an economic crisis, and that corporations are the reason governments cannot find solutions. He does not consider wealth a crime but does think the consequential perpetuation of the class struggle and wealth hoarding is criminal.

He prescribes two responsibilities to corporations: insurance that their employees' human rights are not being exploited, and responsibility-taking when a mistake is made.

He considers that jobs traditionally viewed as women's work, such as nursing and childcare, are underpaid and that politicians should not be making significantly more than people in these occupations.

=== Gender, sexuality, and family ===
Wermuth believes in marriage equality, more equalized parenting and considers himself a feminist. He has recommended the National Council grant 38 weeks—to be shared between both parents—of leave following the birth of their child. He wants external childcare to be free and a guaranteed spot in childcare for all Swiss children. A better work/life balance for National Council members and other politicians is also something he has supported.

Until gender equality is less of an issue in society, Wermuth believes that hiring quotas should be required to stop "mediocre men" hiring even more "mediocre men", while more qualified women have to bend over backwards to even have their résumé considered. Gender discrimination is a social issue and he is very clear that men should be interested and involved in supporting feminism and decreasing inequality. He also believes that abortion is the woman's choice and that women's rights are human rights. He attends Women's Marches with his wife and daughters. The only women's rights issue he grapples with is whether to legalize prostitution because he can see both good and bad in each decision.

=== International relations and immigration ===
Wermuth is in favor of Switzerland joining the European Union (EU) but requires several things to happen before it can be realized. Switzerland must prove itself cooperative and measures must be taken to guarantee public services and wage protection. These necessities should apply equally to Swiss citizens and to everyone already in the EU. Children should be given a Swiss passport at birth if they were born in Switzerland, regardless of their parents' nationality, and Swiss people should know at least one national language (Swiss, German, or French) rather than only English. He believes that both European integration and social progress are possible.

He is also in favor of supporting countries considered to be hot topics; he previously served as co-president of the Switzerland-Kosovo and Swiss-Syriac Parliamentary groups. He has given Kosovo his full support several times and has assumed a political godfatherhood for the Belarusian Viktoryia Mirontsava, who is imprisoned in Belarus. He gets very emotional about discussions of migrants due to his family's history of refugeeism and calls all refugee crises "the result of blatant inequality and exploitation."

=== Other issues ===
Wermuth supports the idea of Switzerland as a welfare state and that social services such as social security for the self-employed; pensions; lower healthcare premiums; dismissal protection for those over 50; and free high-performance internet and mobile communication should be available to all residents.

When asked about his opinion on the separation of church and state, he asks why, if there is a God, so many people go hungry, and how, if God is not omnipotent, his presence in court would be helpful.

Wermuth has also worked with Jewish organizations to get their perspectives on anti-Semitism in Switzerland and to learn more about Judaism. His conclusion was that Switzerland is not doing enough to abnormalize anti-Semitism or using anti-Semitism to aim bigotry at Muslims.

== Personal life ==
Cédric Wermuth and his brother Yann grew up in a very liberal household focused on confronting inequality and helping those in need. Their father says he and his wife never sat them down to spell out their values and ideology, but the boys learned from their childhood experiences. Otto was involved in SP and Laurence participated in anti-nuclear campaigns. They invited refugees—especially those from Yugoslavia in the 1990s—to their home and did what they could to support these families. Wermuth credits these experiences as where his interest in social justice began. He and Yann were given enough autonomy growing up that they developed self-regulation and self-discipline; their parents never used corporal punishment or what Wermuth refers to as "authoritarian structures." The family read voraciously and both boys were successful in school.

Laurence struggled with bipolar disorder and made several suicide attempts throughout her life, particularly when experiencing depressive episodes. She died in Boswil in 2014 due to an accident. Wermuth believes mental illness should not be taboo and that he is "proud to be my mother's son." He described her as the "warmest person" he has ever met.

Wermuth and his wife Anja live in a Minergie-P-Eco certified co-op in Zofingen with their two daughters. She is a teacher and translator in Lucerne; Wermuth said he was attracted to her because she was the "first to get him rhetorically under the table." He has Swiss and Italian dual citizenship.

During his childhood and into his adult life, he has admired Rosa Luxemburg, Micheline Calmy-Rey, Ruth Dreifuss, and Alexandria Ocasio-Cortez, and wishes he had Roger Federer's modesty.
