= Historical economic geography =

Historical economic geography examines the history and development of spatial economic structures. Using historical data, it examines how centers of population and economic activity shift, what patterns of regional specialization and localization evolve over time and what factors explain these changes.

== Examples ==
The first major societies grew in regions with reliable access to arable land, water for irrigation and access to domesticated crops.

The Industrial Revolution began in towns in Britain that were close to flowing rivers that easily accessed surface coal deposits that provided cheap energy along with access to trafficable rivers to transport their goods. This made them an ideal locations for the first factories.

Most major cities have developed on major trade routes. Many cities have grown around major harbours, such as London and New York City, Singapore and Guangzhou. Many major inland cities such as Paris and Moscow grew on rivers that served as trade routes.

Since the industrial revolution, many cities have grown in response to access to man made transport hubs. Manchester grew rapidly as an industrial centre following the construction of a canal to the ocean. Chicago grew around a short channel that linked Lake Michigan with a tributary of the Mississippi River.

Containerisation has caused large changes in transport networks and in manufacturing. In the 1960s, container trade overtook traditional break bulk shipping. This caused a massive change in the nature of ports, away from the waterfront communities built around docks and dock workers, towards centralised container terminals.

Some cities fates have changed in response to the development of transport technology. Buffalo was once the 8th largest city in the United States, largely due to its location on the Erie Canal. However it declined when it was bypassed by the St. Lawrence Seaway. Detroit grew as a major cluster of automotive businesses at a time when there were significant economies related to clustering businesses together. It went into decline when containerisation made dispersed production cheaper as manufacturers were able to efficiently and effectively source their components from remote suppliers.
