= Leakage (retail) =

Retail sales made outside of local area

Retail leakage occurs when local people spend a larger amount of money on goods than local businesses report in sales, usually due to people traveling to a neighboring town to buy goods. Retail sales leakage occurs when there is unsatisfied demand within the trading area and that the locality should provide extra stores spaces for such type of businesses. After all, retail leakage does not necessarily translate into opportunity. For instance, there could be tough competition in a nearby locality that leads the market for same type of product. Many small - to medium-sized communities experience leakage of retail expenditures as local citizens drive to neighboring towns to shop at national retail chains (e.g. Tesco, Asda) or eat at national restaurant chains (e.g. Slug and Lettuce, Harvester). Attracting such national retail chain stores and restaurants to a community can prevent this type of expenditure leakage and create local jobs.

The economic definition of leakage is a situation in which income exits an economy instead of staying within. In retail, leakage refers to consumers spending money outside the local market. For instance, crossing a border to buy goods instead of making the same purchase from local shops. Alternatively a retail leakage can be referred to as a 'negative' Retail Trade Gap or a Surplus factor. Contradictorily a retail surplus means that the locality's trade area is securing the local market and attracting non-local customers.

== Shrinkage ==
Additionally, in retail trade, leakage, or shrinkage can also be the loss of stock without payment, usually due to fraud by employees or shoplifters. The opposite of leakage would be displaced sales. Sources of shrinkage may also be administrative errors or vendor fraud, which is least possible. In the retail industry, it is widely accepted that 2-3% of revenue is lost every year due to shrinkage. The majority of large retailers refer to it as 'acceptable cost of trading'. When the shrinkage is due to employee theft usually this occurred at the point of sale terminal.

== Revenue leakage ==
Revenue is the movement of assets into a company. Revenue leakage, is when those movements of funds are not as good as they must be: if, for instance, a purchaser, who should be paying the full price of something, manages in one way or another, maybe fraudulently, maybe through manipulations of the system, to get a discount. Firms clearly have to protect themselves against this. Better value management can stop revenue and margin leaks and lead to material improvements. Especially amid an economic downturn, given the complexity of decision making and the pressures associated with the quest for deals volume, there is a characteristic tendency to wind up even less disciplined in giving discounts and exceptions to essential evaluating, policies, terms and conditions. Adequately examining transaction evaluating enables companies to distinguish the hidden sources of revenue leakage and to achieve improved estimating opportunities and profit. A price or pocket edge waterfall examination provides a measure of the achieved net and pocketed prices or edges against set defined price targets.

== Leakage analysis ==
A leakage analysis is considered to be one of the most profitable tools in deciding on particular commercial enterprises with retail potential in a given locale. The Retail Leakage and Surplus Analysis inspect the quantitative part of the community's retail opportunities. It is a manual for seeing retail opportunities yet it is not an investigation that demonstrates unconditional opportunities. Leakage/Surplus reports indicate supply (retail deals) estimates sales to customers by establishments. Sales to firms are strongly avoided. Demand (retail potential) gauges the expected amount spent by consumers at retail stores.

The Leakage/Surplus Factor introduces a clear picture of retail opportunity. This is a measure of the relationship between supply and demand that ranges from +100 (total leakage) to - 100 (total surplus). A positive worth speaks to "leakage" of retail opportunity outside the trading area. A negative value represents a surplus of retail sales, a market where consumers are drawn in from outside the trading area. The Retail Gap represents the difference between Retail Potential and Retail Sales. The right analysis can point to "discount investments" that may not be paying off well.

== Digital commerce leakage ==
In a similar way to the physical world, leakage can occur when shoppers buy online. Digital shoppers are usually unaware (or mistaken) of the physical location of the company they are buying from. This can give rise to an increase in unsatisfied demand for digital shopping services in certain locations where the provision of e-commerce is limited. For example, if the retailers in a particular town or city are not able to service the demands of local online shoppers, they are likely to look elsewhere; often toward very large online retailers with global coverage, to satisfy their demand for certain goods. Digital commerce leakage away from businesses in a place is a potential threat to their long term stability and survival. It creates an opportunity for large online retailers to target local shoppers. Measurement of digital leakage is a way to assess the extent to which the Internet is a threat to the high street.
