= Harald Bathelt =

German-Canadian geographer

Harald Bathelt is a German-Canadian geographer, currently a Canada Research Chair at University of Toronto.
