= Social Democratic Party of Switzerland =

Political party in Switzerland

Social Democratic Party of Switzerland: Sozialdemokratische Partei der Schweiz (German); Parti socialiste suisse (French); Partito Socialista Svizzero (Italian); Partida Socialdemocrata da la Svizra (Romansh)
- Abbreviation: SP; PS
- President: Cédric Wermuth; Mattea Meyer
- Members in Federal Council: Élisabeth Baume-Schneider; Beat Jans
- Founded: 21 October 1888; 138 years ago
- Headquarters: Theaterplatz 4, 3011 Bern
- Youth wing: Young Socialists Switzerland
- Membership (2015): c. 30,000
- Ideology: Social democracy Pro-Europeanism
- Political position: Centre-left
- European affiliation: Party of European Socialists (associate)
- International affiliation: Progressive Alliance
- Colours: Red
- Federal Council: 2 / 7
- Council of States: 9 / 46
- National Council: 41 / 200
- Cantonal executives: 28 / 154
- Cantonal legislatures: 442 / 2,544

Website
- sp-ps.ch (German) sp-ps.ch/fr (French) sp-ps.ch/it (Italian)

The Social Democratic Party of Switzerland (German: Sozialdemokratische Partei der Schweiz, SP; Romansh: Partida Socialdemocrata da la Svizra), also called the Swiss Socialist Party (French: Parti socialiste suisse; Italian: Partito Socialista Svizzero, PS), is a political party in Switzerland. The SP has had two representatives on the Federal Council since 1960 and received the second-highest number of votes in the 2023 Swiss federal election.

The SP was founded on 21 October 1888 and is the second-largest of the four leading coalition political parties in Switzerland. It is the only left-leaning party with representatives on the Federal Council, positioning itself at the centre-left. The party is represented by Élisabeth Baume-Schneider and Beat Jans. As of January 2024, the SP is the second-largest political party in the Federal Assembly.

Amongst all pro-European parties in Switzerland, the SP is the largest, and unlike most other Swiss parties, the SP supports Swiss membership in the European Union. Additionally, it supports labour rights and tax incentives for companies that offer shares to employees. The party is a member of the Progressive Alliance and an associate member of the Party of European Socialists.

== History ==
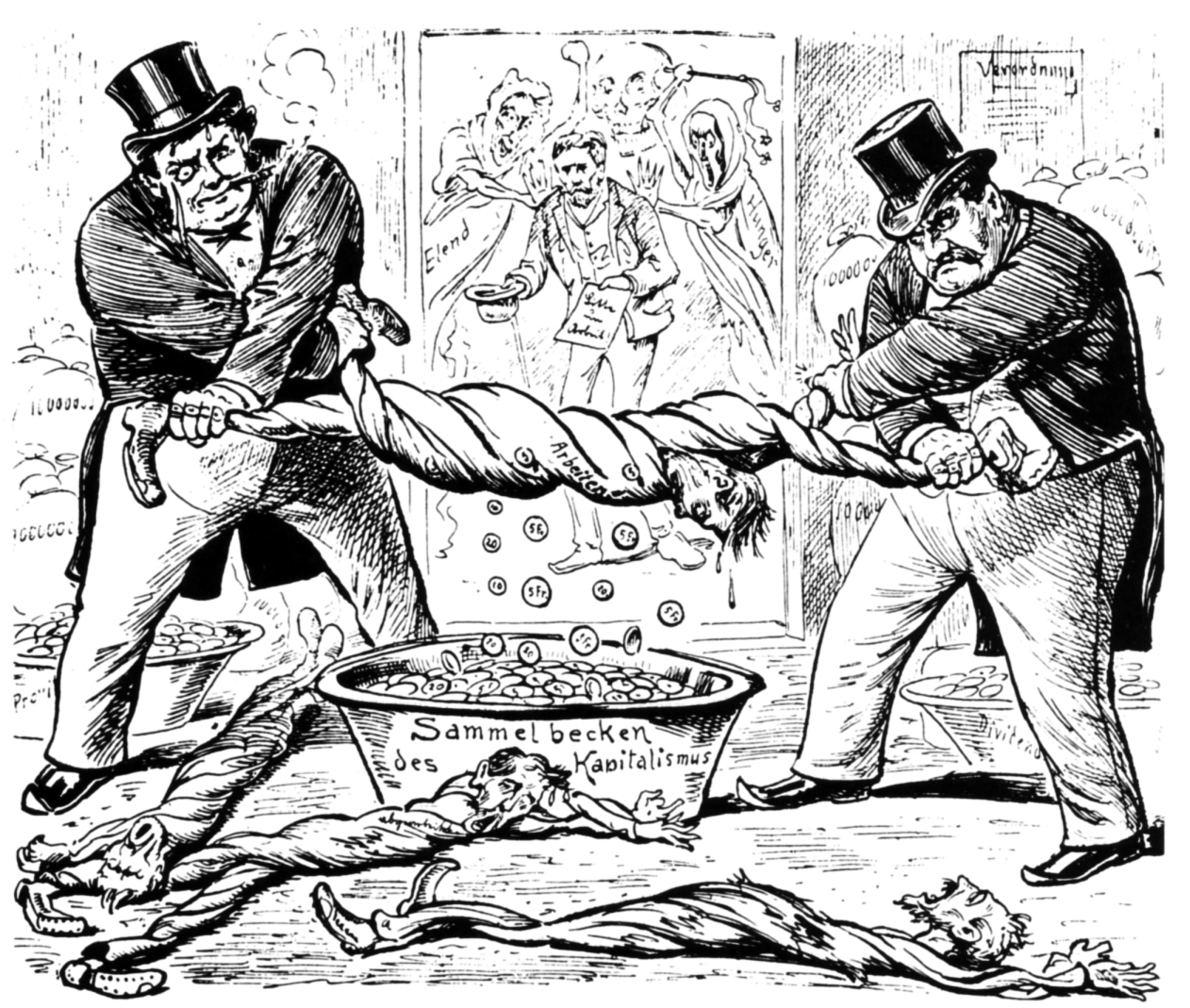
"The new relationship between workers and entrepreneurs", a cartoon of 1896 on bad working conditions in Swiss factories according to the Swiss labour movement in the satirical Zurich magazine Der neue Postillon

Before the establishment of the national SP, there were various 19th-century labour movements in Switzerland such as the Grütli Union, the Swiss Trade Union Federation and several local social democratic parties. Most of these labour parties only lasted a short time, until the foundation of the Social Democratic Party on 21 October 1888 (the Swiss Labour Day). Albert Steck of Bern composed the party's platform which emphasised democracy, rejected revolutionary aspirations, and mandated a democratic solution to the social question. The first party president was Alexander Reichel of Bern.

Two years after the party's foundation, Jakob Vogelsanger was the first Social Democrat to be elected to the National Council. In 1904, the moderate party platform was replaced at a party conference in Aarau with a Marxist program written by Otto Lang. The first-past-the-post voting system for elections to the National Council and the borders of the electorates initially prevented the party from achieving serious political power on the national level, despite growing numbers of supporters. Two popular initiatives for the introduction of a proportional voting system were rejected.

The party's historical archives are hosted today by the Swiss Social Archives, which was founded in 1906 by Paul Pflüger. At a 1912 party conference in Neuchâtel, the question of women's suffrage was debated for the first time. The SP accepted a proposal that committed the party to take any opportunity to "agitate for the introduction of women's suffrage."

=== Interwar period ===
Although Switzerland remained neutral in the First World War, it did not avoid the spiralling economic crisis that accompanied it. The resulting social tension was unleashed in 1918 by the labour unions and the SP who organised the 1918 Swiss general strike. The goal of the strike was a fundamental reorganisation of society. The Federal Council issued an ultimatum to the strikers and allowed the military occupation of central points. In this way the strike was ended after four days. Political action was quickly taken to conciliate the strikers with the introduction of a 48-hour working week and a popular initiative on proportional elections to the National Council in the 1918 Swiss referendums which passed on 13 October 1918. In the 1919 Swiss federal election, the SP doubled its mandate from 20 to 41 members.

With the third party platform, adopted in 1920, disagreement within the party grew ever greater. In particular the fact that the platform called for the foundation of a dictatorship of the proletariat during the transitional phase from a capitalist class-based society to a socialist commune sparked violent dispute within the party. In 1921, the party decided not to join the Communist International. The left wing of the party then split from the SP and founded the Communist Party of Switzerland. In 1926, the SP joined the Labour and Socialist International and continued to be a member of until 1940.

With increasing power in parliament, the party now also demanded membership of the government, but their candidate in 1929 was not elected to the Federal Council. On the other hand, the party managed to enter the executive at a cantonal level in 1933. Geneva was the first canton to have a socialist government, with Léon Nicole as president. In the fourth party platform, promulgated in 1935, the SP rejected the idea of the dictatorship of the proletariat, but supporting the creation of a socialist society on "free and consensual foundations" remained the party's goal.

=== In government ===
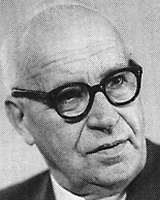
Ernst Nobs, the first SP member of the Federal Council of Switzerland

In the 1943 Swiss federal election, the SP achieved the greatest electoral success in its history and became the largest parliamentary group. Ernst Nobs was the first member of SP to be elected to the Federal Council. With introduction of the Old-age and survivors' insurance, a further demand dating back to the time of the Landesstreik was achieved. After the failure of an SP referendum on economic reforms in 1953, the SP member of the Federal Council, Max Weber, and the general-secretary, David Farbstein, resigned. The SP remained in opposition until the introduction of the "magic formula" in 1959, which gave it two seats on the Federal Council. Since that time the SP has been a member of the grand coalition which governs Switzerland. In 1959, the fifth party platform was also agreed in which the party committed itself to social democracy and democratic socialism.

In the 1970s and 1980s, the SP gained new followers from the new social movements that arose from the protests of 1968, but lost part of their traditional voter base in the working class. This change led to fierce internal disputes and led to a decline in electoral success. After serious losses in the 1987 Swiss federal election, the SP was only the third-largest party in the National Council. This resulted in the foundation of a breakaway Democratic-Social Party, which was not a success.

The sixth party platform was promulgated in 1982. This presented the party as a modern people's party that supported democratic socialism and had social justice as its highest goal. In 1983, the SP nominated Lilian Uchtenhagen as their candidate for the Federal Council, the first time that a woman had been a candidate. The parliamentary majority elected Otto Stich instead. Part of the party demanded that the SP withdraw from the governing coalition as a result of this, but this was rejected by a party conference. Ten years later in March 1993, Ruth Dreifuss was elected as the first SD woman to serve in the Federal Council. On that occasion too, the United Federal Assembly did not choose the official candidate of the SP (Christiane Brunner), but the unofficial candidate Dreifuss (the Brunner-Effekt).

In 1990, the SP party conference accepted Switzerland's accession to the International Monetary Fund with clear conditions and elected the Valais canton councillor, Peter Bodenmann, as party president. At the 1992 party conference in Genf, the SP decided to support accession to the European Economic Area as a first step towards membership of the European Economic Community and endorsed a drug policy involving the decriminalisation of drug consumption, controlled sale of drugs for medicinal purposes, and eventual legalisation of drugs. The following year, the SP supported the national people's initiative "for a reasonable drug policy" which envisioned the legalisation of cannabis. The SP supported the 1994 national initiative "for the protection of the Alps" which sought a substantial shift of transport of goods through the Alps from road to rail. After Otto Stich's resignation from the Federal Council in 1995, the Federal Councillor Moritz Leuenberger was elected as his successor. In the 1995 Swiss federal election, the SP made a substantial recovery and was once again the largest party in the Federal Council.

In June 1997, the party conference chose Zurich city councillor, Ursula Koch as party president (the first woman to hold the role), rather than the favourite Andrea Hämmerle. In the 1999 Swiss federal election, Koch was also elected to the Federal Council. She resigned as party president and Federal councillor in 2000, due to internal party pressure. Her successor was Christiane Brunner, who led the party until 2004.

In the 2007 Swiss federal election, the SP suffered massive losses, falling to 19.5% of the vote, with only 43 seats in the National Council. In the following federal elections (2011 and 2015), their electoral support remained at the same level. In the Council of States, where the SP traditionally have had only a few seats, the party was able to increase its representation over the 2000s and now hold 12 out of 46 seats. In 2017, the party withdrew from the Socialist International and joined the Progressive Alliance. After losing a large vote share in the 2019 elections to the green party the SP regained some of its 2019 losses in the most recent 2023 elections and holds 41 seats on the National Council obtaining 18.27% of the vote.

== Structure ==
Organisational structure of the SP

The SP is composed of around 900 sections across Switzerland, which exist at cantonal and municipal levels. Each of the 32,000 party members are registered in a local section and thus are members of both the cantonal and national parties. Local sections elect delegates to attend the regular party members' conferences; these delegates are entitled to vote in cantonal party conferences.

Each of the 26 cantonal sections (Valais is divided into two sections, namely Oberwallis and Valais Romand) elect delegates for national party conferences. The number of delegates for each canton is equivalent to the number of seats that the canton has in the National Assembly.

The SP has a youth party called the Young Socialists Switzerland (JUSO/JS). The JS are independent of the SP in political terms but are supported by it financially and institutionally. Within the SP, the JS are seen as equivalent to a cantonal section and so they are entitled to send some delegates to party conferences. As of 2022, the president of the JS is Nicola Siegrist. There is also a separate, smaller SP youth party called Junge SP in the Olten region.

== Ideology ==
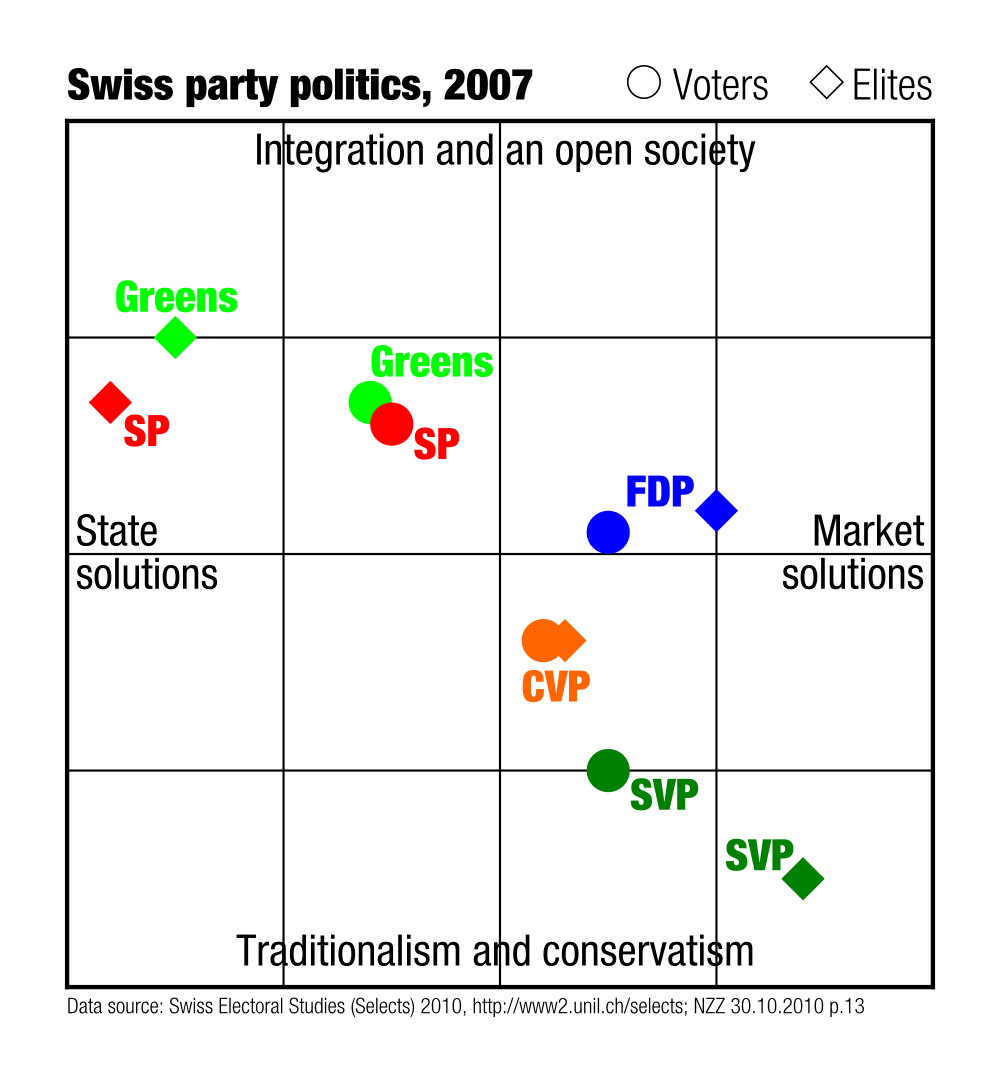
The SP's positions in the Swiss political spectrum in 2007

The SP supports classical social democratic policies, as well as some democratic socialist ones, and has been described as one of the more left-leaning social democratic parties in Europe. To that rule, the SP stands for a government offering strong public services. The SP is against far-reaching economic liberalism and has anti-capitalist tendencies, and is in favor of social progressivism, environmental policy with climate change mitigation, for an open foreign policy, and a national security policy based on pacifism.

In economic, financial, and social welfare policy, the SP rejects policies of economic liberalisation such as deregulation, lowering taxes for high-income citizens, and decreases in government spending on social insurance. The SP also opposes raising the retirement age. In addition, the SP is a proponent of increasing welfare spending in some areas such as for a publicly financed maternity leave, universal health care and a flexible retirement age. In tax policy, the SP opposes the notion of lowering taxes for high-income citizens. By campaigning for the harmonisation of all tax rates in Switzerland, the SP seeks more redistribution. The SP is skeptical toward the privatization of state enterprises. Nonetheless, the SP also promotes more competition in the areas of agriculture and parallel imports.

In social policy, the SP is committed to social equity and an open society. The SP aims at making working conditions for women in families easier by promoting more external childcare centers and more opportunities for part-time jobs. It also aims at reinforcing sexual equality in terms of eliminating wage differences based on gender, supports civil union for Same-sex couples and takes an easier stance toward abortions. The SP also rejects strengthening restrictions on asylum seekers and immigrants. The party supports the integration of immigrants by which the immigrants are assigned to immigration procedures immediately after entering the country. The SP has a liberal stance toward drugs and is in favor of publicly regulated heroin consumption and the legalization of cannabis. Nevertheless, the SP supports the smoking ban in restaurants and bars.

In foreign policy, the SP promotes further participation by Switzerland in international organizations. It supports immediate entry of Switzerland into the European Union, while recently supported EU bilateral accords. The SP also stands for a less strict neutrality of Switzerland, and supports increased international efforts on the part of Switzerland in the areas of peace and human rights. However, the SP supports keeping the military neutrality and opposes entry into NATO. Its pacifist stance is also reflected in its military policy as the SP supports reducing the number of Swiss militia while making the military apparatus more professional and scrapping conscription. Another demand of the SP is to end the tradition of gun ownership, using severe and recent examples of abuse in terms of murder as proof.

The SP has common environmentalist policies with the Green Party of Switzerland which are reflected in the expansion of ecotax reforms and increased state support for energy saving measures and renewable energies. The SP is against the construction of new roads where possible and instead proposes to shift the transportation of goods from the roads to the railways and the introduction of a cap and trade and traffic management system when it comes to transportation across the Swiss Alps. Furthermore, the SP stands for an expansion of the public transportation system network and opposes nuclear power.

== Electoral performance ==
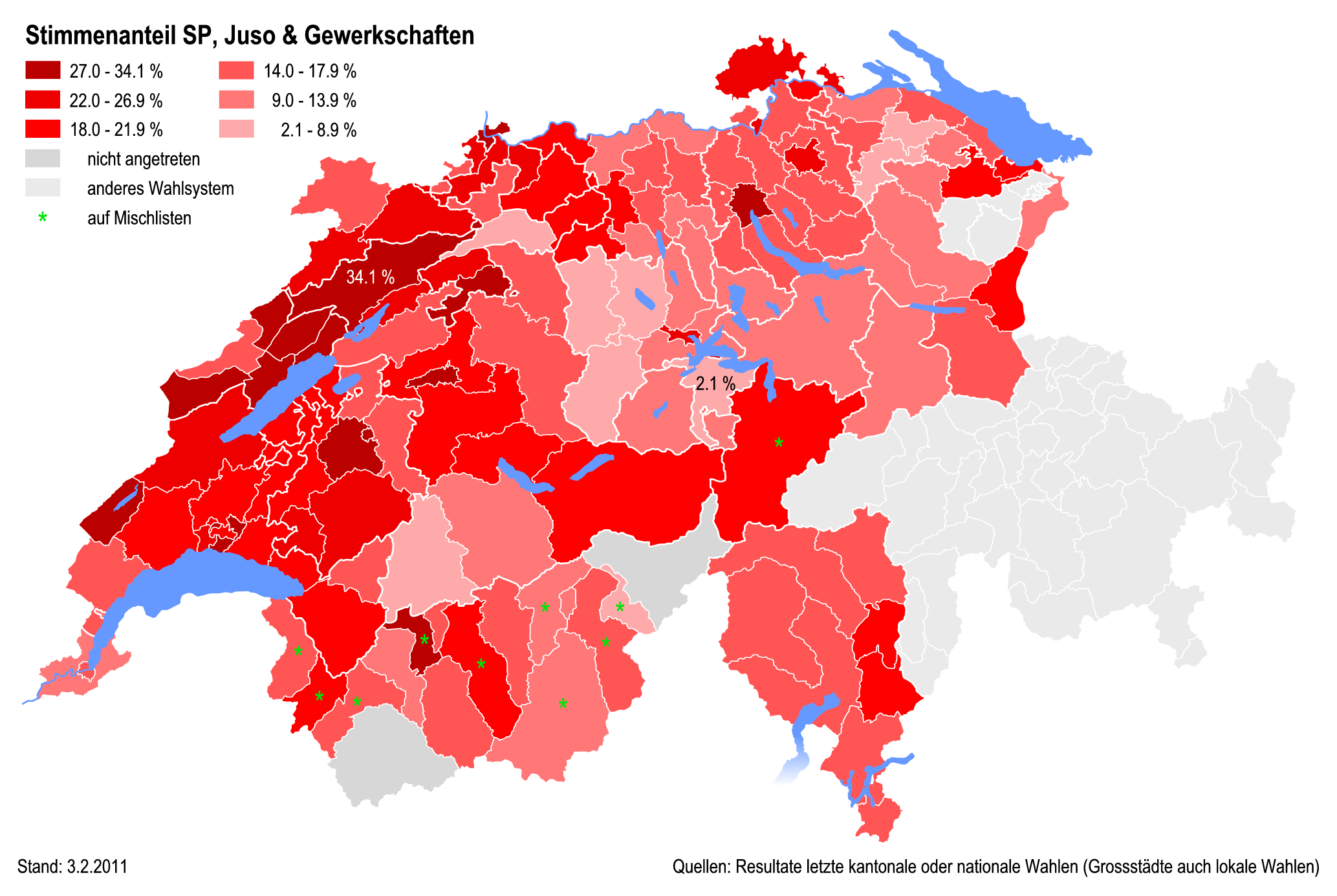
Percentages of the SP at district level in 2011

Strongest in urban areas, the SP's support is spread across the country as they hold roughly one-fifth of seats in cantonal parliaments, but are the largest party in only two, Basel-Stadt and Basel-Landschaft (coloured red above).

In 2003, the party held 52 mandates out of 200 in the National Council (lower chamber of the Swiss parliament); nine out of 46 in the Council of States (upper chamber) and two out of seven mandates in the Federal Council (executive body). By 2005, it held 23.8% of the seats in the Cantonal governments and 23.2% in the Cantonal parliaments (index BADAC, weighted with the population and number of seats). At the 2023 Swiss federal election, the party won 18.27% of the popular vote and 41 out of 200 seats on the National Council.

=== National Council ===
Election	Votes	%	Seats	+/–	Rank
1890	N/A	3.6 (#5)	1 / 147	▲1	5th
1893	N/A	5.9 (#5)	1 / 147	Steady	5th
1896	25,304	6.8 (#4)	2 / 147	▲1	4th ▲
1899	35,488	9.6 (#4)	4 / 147	▲2	4th
1902	51,338	12.6 (#3)	7 / 167	▲3	4th
1905	60,308	14.7 (#3)	2 / 167	▼5	5th ▼
1908	70,003	17.6 (#3)	7 / 167	▲5	4th ▼
1911	80,050	20.0 (#2)	15 / 189	▲8	3rd ▲
1914	34,204	10.1 (#3)	19 / 189	▲3	3rd
1917	158,450	30.8 (#2)	20 / 189	▲2	3rd
1919	175,292	23.5 (#2)	41 / 189	▲21	2nd ▲
1922	170,974	23.3 (#2)	43 / 198	▲2	3rd ▼
1925	192,208	25.8 (#2)	49 / 198	▲6	2nd ▲
1928	220,141	27.4 (#1)	50 / 198	▲1	2nd
1931	247,946	28.7 (#1)	49 / 187	▼1	2nd
1935	255,843	28.0 (#1)	50 / 187	▲1	1st ▲
1939	160,377	25.9 (#1)	45 / 187	▼5	2nd ▼
1943	251,576	28.6 (#1)	56 / 194	▲11	1st ▲
1947	251,625	26.2 (#1)	48 / 194	▼8	2nd ▼
1951	249,857	26.0 (#1)	49 / 196	▲1	2nd
1955	263,664	27.0 (#1)	53 / 196	▲4	1st ▲
1959	259,139	26.4 (#1)	51 / 196	▼2	1st (Note: Tied with the Free Democratic Party.)
1963	256,063	26.6 (#1)	53 / 200	▲2	1st
1967	233,873	23.5 (#1)	50 / 200	▼3	1st
1971	452,195	22.9 (#1)	46 / 200	▼4	2nd ▼
1975	477,125	24.9 (#1)	55 / 200	▲9	2nd
1979	443,794	24.4 (#1)	51 / 200	▼4	2nd
1983	444,365	22.8 (#2)	47 / 200	▼4	2nd
1987	353,334	18.4 (#3)	41 / 200	▼6	3rd ▼
1991	373,664	18.5 (#2)	41 / 200	0	2nd ▲
1995	410,136	21.8 (#1)	54 / 200	▲13	2nd
1999	438,555	22.5 (#2)	51 / 200	▼3	2nd
2003	490,392	23.3 (#2)	52 / 200	▲1	2nd
2007	450,308	19.5 (#2)	43 / 200	▼9	2nd
2011	451,236	18.7 (#2)	46 / 200	▲3	2nd
2015	475,071	18.8 (#2)	43 / 200	▼3	2nd
2019	408,128	16.8 (#2)	39 / 200	▼4	2nd
2023	466,714	18.3 (#2)	41 / 200	▲2	2nd

=== Party strength over time ===
Percentage of the total vote for the SP in federal elections, 1971–2019
Canton	1971	1975	1979	1983	1987	1991	1995	1999	2003	2007	2011	2015	2019	2023
Switzerland	22.9	24.9	24.4	22.8	18.4	18.5	21.8	22.5	23.3	19.5	18.7	18.8	16.8	18.3
Zürich	20.9	23.9	26.5	23.0	17.4	18.8	23.1	25.6	25.7	19.8	19.3	21.4	17.3	21.1
Bern	31.0	31.0	30.5	28.3	22.3	20.0	24.7	27.6	27.9	21.2	19.3	19.7	16.8	20.7
Luzern	12.4	13.4	12.5	11.8	9.0	11.0	11.7	10.0	11.1	11.5	11.5	13.6	13.5	13.7
Uri	*^{a}	*	23.0	*	*	*	*	*	*	*	21.5	*	22.3	*
Schwyz	29.0	29.3	22.6	21.0	14.3	19.4	19.9	16.4	17.6	13.9	15.7	13.1	13.8	10.9
Obwalden	*	*	*	*	*	*	*	*	*	11.6	*	*	2.9	*
Nidwalden	*	*	10.6	*	*	*	*	*	*	*	*	*	*	*
Glarus	57.2	64.7	*	*	*	53.7	83.9	85.7	67.1	55.5	24.6	45.0	28.2	23.4
Zug	*	35.7	30.9	22.8	22.6	16.1	17.0	23.3	13.4	9.1	5.3	13.8	9.3	5.2
Fribourg	19.9	25.7	30.7	24.0	22.2	18.6	17.3	20.3	21.5	22.7	26.7	24.2	21.2	20.6
Solothurn	26.3	31.4	28.4	27.8	22.3	19.8	24.2	27.2	25.4	19.5	18.3	20.0	18.4	17.2
Basel-Stadt	30.4	33.3	33.3	31.0	25.9	25.3	35.5	33.3	40.9	35.2	29.1	33.3	32.7	31.8
Basel-Landschaft	28.2	30.3	31.4	32.5	22.8	24.4	25.3	23.3	24.7	25.2	24.4	22.2	21.8	24.7
Schaffhausen	40.2	37.2	35.3	35.4	39.2	34.2	37.8	33.6	39.7	34.2	34.6	28.8	26.2	27.4
Appenzell A.Rh.	37.4	40.1	*	23.6	*	*	21.9	29.6	19.9	*	*	28.6	*	*
Appenzell I.Rh.	*	*	*	*	*	*	*	*	*	*	20.3	18.1	8.7	*
St. Gallen	14.6	15.1	18.0	16.3	11.4	13.1	16.2	17.1	18.4	14.7	16.7	14.2	12.7	12.7
Graubünden	13.9	15.2	20.5	24.6	19.5	21.2	21.6	26.6	24.9	23.7	15.6	17.6	17.1	17.8
Aargau	23.9	24.2	27.6	27.5	18.5	17.4	19.4	18.7	21.2	17.9	18.0	16.1	16.5	16.4
Thurgau	20.7	21.6	22.4	19.5	13.4	15.1	18.1	16.1	14.1	11.7	12.1	12.7	12.6	10.2
Ticino	13.1	13.9	15.2	13.8	9.3	6.7	17.1	18.8	25.8	18.1	16.6	15.9	14.1	12.5
Vaud	25.0	27.6	24.9	21.9	22.5	22.9	22.7	22.4	21.7	22.0	25.2	22.2	20.4	25.3
Valais	15.4	17.4	11.6	14.1	14.5	14.5	16.6	16.9	19.1	14.7	14.6	13.3	15.1	14.3
Neuchâtel	30.6	38.9	37.4	33.1	30.8	29.8	28.2	28.0	29.2	25.9	24.7	23.7	16.6	22.5
Genève	19.1	22.6	21.5	19.2	18.6	26.4	30.0	20.0	24.8	19.1	19.1	19.9	14.7	18.4
Jura	^{b}	^{b}	*	17.8	25.5	28.8	32.4	34.2	34.2	36.9	30.8	23.7	27.0	29.6

1.^a* indicates that the party was not on the ballot in this canton.
2.^bIt was part of the Canton of Bern until 1979.

== Presidents ==
1888–1889	Alexander Reichel
1890–1891	Albert Steck
1892–1894	Eugen Wullschleger
1894–1896	Wilhelm Fürholz
1897	Karl Zgraggen
1898	Paul Brandt
1898–1901	Otto Lang
1901–1902	Joseph Albisser
1902–1908	Gottfried Reimann
1909–1910	Eduard Kessler
1911	Hans Näher
1912–1916	Fritz Studer
1916–1917	Emil Klöti
1918	Jakob Gschwend
1919	Gustav Müller
1919–1936	Ernst Reinhard
1937–1952	Hans Oprecht
1953–1962	Walther Bringolf
1962–1970	Fritz Grütter
1970–1974	Arthur Schmid
1974–1990	Helmut Hubacher
1990–1997	Peter Bodenmann
1997–2000	Ursula Koch
2000–2004	Christiane Brunner
2004–2008	Hans-Jürg Fehr
2008–2020	Christian Levrat
2020–present	Cédric Wermuth; Mattea Meyer

== Members of the Federal Council ==
1943–1951	Ernst Nobs
1951–1953	Max Weber
1959–1969	Willy Spühler
1959–1973	Hans-Peter Tschudi
1969–1977	Pierre Graber
1973–1983	Willy Ritschard
1977–1987	Pierre Aubert
1987–1993	René Felber
1983–1995	Otto Stich
1993–2002	Ruth Dreifuss
1995–2010	Moritz Leuenberger
2003–2011	Micheline Calmy-Rey
2010–2022	Simonetta Sommaruga
2011–2023	Alain Berset
2023–present	Élisabeth Baume-Schneider
2024–present	Beat Jans

== See also ==
- Plainpalais
- Vreni Schawalder
