= Lise Salvas-Bronsard =

Canadian economist and writer (1940–1995)

- Born: 1940
- Died: August 1995 (aged 54–55)
- Occupation: Economist

Academic background
- Education: Université Laval; University of Louvain
- Thesis: Les techniques quantitatives de la planification

Academic work
- Discipline: Economics; Macroeconomics
- Institutions: Université de Montréal

Lise Salvas-Bronsard (1940 – August 1995) was a Canadian economist and writer who was a teacher of economics and macroeconomics in the economics department of the Université de Montréal from 1970 to 1995. She mainly researched economic policy and quantitive techniques and conducted multiple analyses of microeconomics and macroeconomics, with themes such as theory of value, macroeconomic optimum concept as well as rational expectations. Salvas-Bronsard served as a visiting scholar of both the University of Louvain's Center for Operations Research and Econometrics as well as France's Institut national de la statistique et des études économiques and was on the editorial board or associate editor of multiple academic journals.

== Early life ==
Salvas-Bronsard was born in 1940. She earned a Master of Arts in economics from the Quebec institution Université Laval in 1965. Salvas-Bronsard received a pre-doctoral Canada Council grant for study in the humanities social sciences and fine arts that same year. In 1966, she worked for a year at the Bureau d'aménagement de Test du Quebec. Salvas-Bronsard travelled to Belgium to study for a doctorate in economics in the graduate programme at the University of Louvain, from which she graduated in 1972. She authored the thesis Les techniques quantitatives de la planification (English: Quantitive Techniques for Economic Policy) which was later published in a book. As a graduate student, she published in Econometrica with Anton Barten, her dissertation adviser.

== Career ==
In 1970, Salvas-Bronsard began working as a faculty member at the economics department of the Université de Montréal, teaching economics and macroeconomics. She trained a great number of economists, who went on to work in Canada and elsewhere. Salvas-Bronsard conducted scientific work on models on household demand, bringing together several empirical subjects either with or not in collaboration with her students, particularly the research conducted by Eugen Slutsky. Her primary research themes were economic policy and quantitative techniques, and she organised her research around solid theoretical foundations and economic techniques' most relevant uses. Salvas-Bronsard mainly worked on estimating demand equations' complete systems and studies on estimating demand functions. which were subject to the role of good markets rationing and to quantify labour market constraints. This work formed a link for econometric research to disequilibrium macroeconomics research. She also obtained estimates for complete supply-and-demand factors to complete production factors and was a contributor to multiple analyses of microeconomics and macroeconomics, on themes which included theory of value, macroeconomic optimum concept as well as rational expectations. According to Marcel Dagenais, Salvas-Bronsard was able to expand upon "the range of behavioural hypotheses underlying these types of models, and she suggested extensions incorporating labour markets and financial markets".

She worked as a visiting scholar at Louvain's Center for Operations Research and Econometrics as well as France's Institut national de la statistique et des études économiques during various points of her career. Salvas-Bronsard was a member of both the Société canadienne de science économique and the Canadian Economics Association (CEA), due to her keeping in contact in Francophone Europe economics and she served as president of the former institute from 1984 to 1985. She was also a member of the CEA's executive council. Salvas-Bronsard was an associate editor of the Canadian Journal of Economics of which she published in both English and French as well as the L'Actualité Economique. She was also on the editorial boards of the Annales de V INSEE, Etudes Internationales, and Recherches Economiques de Louvain. Salvas-Bronsard's research was published in Annales d'Économie et de Statistique, the L'Actualité Economique, the Canadian Journal of Economics, Economie Appliquee, the European Economic Review, the Journal of Applied Econometrics, and the Tijdschrift voor Economie en Management.

== Personal life ==
Salvas-Bronsard was married to her Université de Montréal colleague Camille Bronsard, and the couple were the parents of two children. She died in August 1995.

== Legacy ==
Dagenais wrote of Salvas-Bronsard: "Her enthusiasm, availability and dedication, as well as the clarity of her econometric and macroeconomic teaching, were deeply appreciated by all her students. Her beneficial influence on students was magnified through the many pedagogical responsibilities she took on through those years."
