= Sanford J. Grossman =

American economist (born 1953)

- Born: July 21, 1953 (age 73)

Academic background
- Education: University of Chicago (BA, MA, PhD)
- Doctoral advisor: Arnold Zellner

Academic work
- Discipline: Quantitative finance
- School or tradition: Chicago School of Economics
- Institutions: University of Pennsylvania
- Website: Information at IDEAS / RePEc

Sanford "Sandy" Jay Grossman (born July 21, 1953) is an American economist and hedge fund manager specializing in financial economics and quantitative finance. Grossman's research has spanned the analysis of information in securities markets, corporate structure, property rights, and optimal dynamic risk management. He has published widely in leading economic and business journals, including American Economic Review, Journal of Econometrics, Econometrica, and Journal of Finance. His research in macroeconomics, finance, and risk management has earned numerous awards. Grossman is currently chairman and CEO of QFS Asset Management, an affiliate of which he founded in 1988. QFS Asset Management shut down its sole remaining hedge fund in January 2014.

== Academic career ==
Grossman was born in New York. He earned his A.B. in 1973, A.M. in 1974 and Ph.D. in 1975, all in economics from the University of Chicago. Since receiving his doctorate, he has held academic appointments at Stanford University, the University of Chicago, Princeton University (as the John L. Weinberg Professor of Economics, 1985–89), and at the University of Pennsylvania’s Wharton School of Business. At Wharton, Grossman held the position of Steinberg Trustee Professor of Finance from 1989 to 1999 (a title now held in Emeritus) and also served as the Director of the Wharton Center for Quantitative Finance (1994–1999).

== Professional career ==
Grossman served as an Economist with the Board of Governors of the Federal Reserve System (1977–78), and was a Public Director of the largest U.S. options and futures exchange, the Chicago Board of Trade (1992–96). In 1988, he was elected a Director, in 1992 served as Vice President, and in 1994 was President of the American Finance Association.

Grossman formed an affiliate of QFS Asset Management, L.P. in 1988. The firm is based in Greenwich, Connecticut, and is an alternative investment management firm that uses financial investment models based on Grossman's research in economics and quantitative finance. The firm specializes in global macro and foreign exchange investment strategies.

== Awards ==
Grossman’s original contributions to economic research received official recognition when he was awarded the John Bates Clark Medal by the American Economic Association at its December 1987 annual meeting. That same year the Q-Group awarded him first prize in The Roger F. Murray Prize competition for the paper “An Analysis of the Implications for Stock and Future Price Volatility of Program Trading and Dynamic Hedging Strategies.” The editorial board of the Financial Analysts Journal awarded him the 1988 Graham and Dodd Scroll for “Program Trading and Market Volatility: A Report on Interday Relationships.” Grossman received a Mathematical Finance 1993 Best Paper Award for his article “Optimal Investment Strategies for Controlling Drawdowns.” Grossman received the 1996 Leo Melamed Prize by the University of Chicago Graduate School of Business for outstanding scholarship by a professor. In 2002, Grossman was recognized by the University of Chicago with its Professional Achievement Citation. Most recently, he was awarded the 2009 CME Group-MSRI Prize in Innovative Quantitative Applications.

== Publications ==
Books:

- Sanford J. Grossman (1989). The Informational Role of Prices. The MIT Press. ISBN 978-0-262-07121-5.

Articles:

- Sanford J. Grossman; Joseph Stiglitz (1980). "On the Impossibility of Informationally Efficient Markets". American Economic Review. 70 (3): 393–408.
- Sanford J. Grossman (1975). "Rational Expectations and the Economic Modeling of Markets Subject to Uncertainty: A Bayesian Approach". Journal of Econometrics. 3 (3): 255–272. doi:10.1016/0304-4076(75)90035-4.
- Sanford J. Grossman (1975). R. Day; T. Groves (eds.). Equilibrium Under Uncertainty and Bayesian Adaptive Control Theory. Academic Press. pp. 279–307. ISBN 978-0-12-207350-2.
- Sanford J. Grossman (1976). "On the Efficiency of Competitive Stock Markets Where Traders Have Diverse Information". Journal of Finance. 31 (2): 573–584. doi:10.2307/2326627. JSTOR 2326627.
- Sanford J. Grossman; Joseph Stiglitz (1976). "Information and Competitive Price Systems". American Economic Review. 66 (2): 246–253.
- Sanford J. Grossman; Joseph Stiglitz (1977). "On Value Maximization and Alternative Objectives of the Firm Information and Competitive Price Systems". Journal of Finance. 32 (2): 389–402. doi:10.1111/j.1540-6261.1977.tb03278.x.
- Sanford J. Grossman (1977). "A Characterization of the Optimality of Equilibrium in Incomplete Markets". Journal of Economic Theory. 15 (2): 1–15. doi:10.1016/0022-0531(77)90063-1.
- Sanford J. Grossman (1977). "The Existence of Future Markets, Noisy Rational Expectations and Informational Externalities". Review of Economic Studies. 64 (3): 431–449.
- Sanford J. Grossman; Richard Kihlstrom; Leonard Mirman (1977). "A Bayesian Approach to the Production of Information and Learning by Doing". Review of Economic Studies. 64 (3): 533–547.
- Sanford J. Grossman (1978). "Further Results on the Informational Efficiency of Competitive Stock Markets". Journal of Economic Theory. 18 (1): 81–101. doi:10.1016/0022-0531(78)90043-1.
- Sanford J. Grossman; Oliver Hart (1979). "A Theory of Competitive Equilibrium in Stock Market Economies". Econometrica. 47 (2): 293–330. doi:10.2307/1914186. JSTOR 1914186.
- Sanford J. Grossman; D. Levhari; Leonard Mirman (1979). Green; Scheinkman (eds.). Consumption under Uncertainty. Academic Press. pp. 105–124. ISBN 978-0-12-298750-2.
- Sanford J. Grossman; Joseph E. Stiglitz. (1980). "On the Impossibility of Informationally Efficient Markets." The American Economic Review 70 (3). https://www.jstor.org/stable/1805228
- Sanford J. Grossman; Oliver Hart (1980). David A. Currie; William Peters (eds.). Take-Over Bids: The Managerial Theory of the Firm and the Free Rider Problem. Croom Helm London. pp. 461–468. ISBN 978-0-85664-803-8.
- Sanford J. Grossman; Joseph Stiglitz (1980). "Stockholder Unanimity in Making Production and Financial Decisions". Quarterly Journal of Economics. 94 (3): 543–566. doi:10.2307/1884584. JSTOR 1884584. S2CID 53395457.
- Sanford J. Grossman; Oliver Hart (1980). "Disclosure Laws and Takeover Bids". Journal of Finance. 35 (2): 323–334. doi:10.2307/2327390. JSTOR 2327390.
- Sanford J. Grossman; Oliver Hart (1980). "Takeover Bids, the Free-Rider Problem, and the Theory of the Corporation". The RAND Journal of Economics. 11 (1): 42–64. doi:10.2307/3003400. JSTOR 3003400.
- Sanford J. Grossman (1981). "Nash Equilibrium and the Industrial Organization of Markets with Large Fixed Costs". Econometrica: 1149–1172.
- Sanford J. Grossman; Oliver Hart (1981). "Implicit Contracts, Moral Hazard and Unemployment". American Economic Review. 71 (2): 301–307.
- Sanford J. Grossman; Robert Shiller (1981). "The Determinants of the Variability of Stock Market Prices". American Economic Review. 71 (2): 222–227. doi:10.3386/w0564.
- Sanford J. Grossman; Oliver Hart (1981). "The Allocational Role of Takeover Bids in Situations of Asymmetric Information". Journal of Finance. 36 (2): 253–270. doi:10.2307/2327007. JSTOR 2327007.
- Sanford J. Grossman (1981). "An Introduction to the Theory of Rational Expectations Under Asymmetric Information". Review of Economic Studies. 48 (4): 541–559. doi:10.2307/2297195. JSTOR 2297195.
- Sanford J. Grossman (1981). "The Informational Role of Warranties and Private Disclosure About Product Quality". Journal of Law and Economics: 461–483.
- Sanford J. Grossman; Oliver Hart (1982). John McCall (ed.). Corporate Financial Structure and Managerial Incentives. University of Chicago Press. pp. 107–140. ISBN 978-0-226-55559-1.
- Sanford J. Grossman; L. Weiss (1982). "Heterogeneous Information and the Theory of the Business Cycle" (PDF). Journal of Political Economy. 90 (4): 699–727. doi:10.1086/261085. S2CID 153507579.
- Sanford J. Grossman; Oliver Hart (1983). "An Analysis of the Principal-Agent Problem". Econometrica. 51 (1): 7–46. CiteSeerX 10.1.1.190.2716. doi:10.2307/1912246. JSTOR 1912246.
- Sanford J. Grossman; Robert Shiller (1982). "Consumption Correlatedness and Risk Measurement in Economies with Non-Traded Assets, and Heterogeneous Information". Journal of Financial Economics. 10 (2): 195–210. doi:10.1016/0304-405X(82)90013-7.
- Sanford J. Grossman; L. Weiss (1982). Marshall Sarnal; Girogio Szego (eds.). Monetary Non-Neutrality When Prices are Observable. Ballinger Publishing Co. pp. 313–314. ISBN 978-0-88410-851-1.
- Sanford J. Grossman; Oliver Hart (1983). "Implicit Contracts under Asymmetric Information". Quarterly Journal of Economics. 98: 123–156. doi:10.2307/1885377. JSTOR 1885377.
- Sanford J. Grossman; David S. Evans (1983). David Evans (ed.). Integration. North Holland Publishing Co. pp. 95–126. ISBN 978-0-444-00734-6.
- Sanford J. Grossman; L. Weiss (1983). "A Transactions Based Model of the Monetary Transmission Mechanism". American Economic Review. 73 (5): 871–880. doi:10.3386/w0973.
- Sanford J. Grossman; Oliver Hart; Eric Maskin (1983). "Unemployment with Observable Aggregate Shocks". Journal of Political Economy. 91 (6): 907–928. doi:10.1086/261193. S2CID 4865344.
- Sanford J. Grossman; L. Weiss (1984). M. Boyer; R. Kihlstrom (eds.). Savings and Insurance. Elsevier Science Publishers. pp. 303–311. ISBN 978-0-444-86502-1.
- Sanford J. Grossman; Daniel R. Fischel (1984). "Customer Protection in Futures and Securities Markets". Journal of Futures Markets. 4 (3): 273–295. doi:10.1002/fut.3990040303.
- Sanford J. Grossman; Oliver Hart (1986). "The Costs and Benefits of Ownership: A Theory of Vertical Integration" (PDF). Journal of Political Economy. 94 (4): 691–719. doi:10.1086/261404. S2CID 215807368.
- Sanford J. Grossman; Merton Miller (1986). "Economic Costs and Benefits of the Proposed One-Minute Time Bracketing Regulations". Journal of Futures Markets. 6 (1): 141–166. doi:10.1002/fut.3990060112.
- Sanford J. Grossman (1986). "An Analysis of the Role of 'Insider Trading' on Futures Markets". The Journal of Business. 59 (2): 5129–5146. doi:10.1086/296342.
- Sanford J. Grossman; Oliver Hart (1987). Razin; Sadka (eds.). Vertical Integration and the Distribution of Property Rights. The Macmillan Press. pp. 504–546. ISBN 978-0-312-23453-9.
- Sanford J. Grossman; Motty Perry (1986). "Sequential Bargaining Under Asymmetric Information" (PDF). Journal of Economic Theory. 39 (1): 120–154. doi:10.1016/0022-0531(86)90023-2. S2CID 154201801.
- Sanford J. Grossman; Motty Perry (1986). "Perfect Sequential Equilibrium". Journal of Economic Theory. 39 (1): 97–119. doi:10.1016/0022-0531(86)90022-0.
- Sanford J. Grossman (1987). William Barnett; Kenneth Singleton (eds.). Monetary Dynamics with Proportional Transactions Cost and Fixed Payment Periods. Cambridge University Press. pp. 3–40. ISBN 978-0-521-10049-6.
- Sanford J. Grossman; A. Melino; Robert Shiller (1987). "Estimating the Continuous-Time Consumption-Based Asset-Pricing Model" (PDF). Journal of Business and Economic Statistics. 5 (3): 315–327. doi:10.2307/1391605. JSTOR 1391605.
- Sanford J. Grossman (1988). "Program Trading and Stock and Futures Price Volatility". Journal of Futures Markets. 8 (4): 413–419. doi:10.1002/fut.3990080403.
- Sanford J. Grossman; Oliver Hart (1988). "One Share/One Vote and the Market for Corporate Control" (PDF). Journal of Financial Economics. 20 (1/2): 175–202. doi:10.1016/0304-405X(88)90044-X. hdl:1721.1/63929. S2CID 154323643.
- Sanford J. Grossman (1988). "An Analysis of the Implications for Stock and Futures Price Volatility of Program Trading and Dynamic Hedging Strategies" (PDF). The Journal of Business. 61 (3): 275–298. doi:10.1086/296433. S2CID 153761795.
- Sanford J. Grossman (1988). "Insurance Seen and Unseen". Journal of Portfolio Management. 14 (4): 5–8. doi:10.3905/jpm.1988.409164. S2CID 153838612.
- Sanford J. Grossman; Merton Miller (1988). "Liquidity and Market Structure" (PDF). Journal of Finance. 43 (3): 617–637. doi:10.2307/2328186. JSTOR 2328186.
- Sanford J. Grossman (1988). "Program Trading and Market Volatility: A Report on Interday Relationships". Financial Analysts Journal: 18–28.
- Sanford J. Grossman (1988). "Derivative Securities, Dynamic Hedging and Stock Market Volatility". MTEC Journal (1): 1–15.
- Sanford J. Grossman (1989). Robert J. Barro (ed.). Rational Expectations and the Informational Role of Prices. Harvard University Press. pp. 128–152. ISBN 978-0-674-57860-9.
- Sanford J. Grossman (1989). "Informational Tactical Asset Allocation". MTEC Journal (2): 7–24.
- Sanford J. Grossman; Jean Luc Vila (1989). "Portfolio Insurance in Complete Markets: A Note". The Journal of Business. 62 (4): 473–476. doi:10.1086/296473.
- Sanford J. Grossman; Guy Laroque (1990). "Asset Pricing and Optimal Portfolio Choice in the Presence of Illiquid Durable Consumption Goods" (PDF). Econometrica. 58 (1): 25–51. doi:10.2307/2938333. JSTOR 2938333. S2CID 154575467.
- Sanford J. Grossman (1990). Daniel R. Siegel (ed.). Trading Technology and Financial Market Stability. Irwin Professional Publishing. pp. 47–57. ISBN 978-1-55738-120-0.
- Sanford J. Grossman (1990). "Market Liquidity and Trading Technology". MTEC Journal (3): 7–17.
- Sanford J. Grossman; Jean-Luc Vila (1992). "Optimal Dynamic Trading with Leverage Constraints". Journal of Financial and Quantitative Analysis. 27 (2): 151–168. doi:10.2307/2331365. JSTOR 2331365. S2CID 153640177.
- Sanford J. Grossman (1991). "Dynamic Leveraging Strategies and the Risk/Return Profile of Professionally Managed Futures -- Including a Commentary on Elton, Gruber, and Rentzier's Evaluation of Commodity Funds". MFA Journal. 6 (2): 51–56.
- Sanford J. Grossman (1992). "The Informational Role of Upstairs and Downstairs Trading". The Journal of Business. 65 (4): 509–528. doi:10.1086/296583.
- Sanford J. Grossman (1992). "Informational Portfolio Strategies for Dynamic Asset Allocation". MTEC Journal. 5: 3–15.
- Sanford J. Grossman (1992). "The Case for Eliminating Position Limits on Financial Futures". Journal of Financial Engineering. 2 (1): 39–42.
- Sanford J. Grossman (1992). "A Proposal for the Reform of Disclosure Requirements for Managed Futures". Journal of Financial Engineering. 2 (1): 55–58.
- Sanford J. Grossman; Zhongquan Zhou (1993). "Optimal Investment Strategies for Controlling Drawdowns". Mathematical Finance. 3 (3): 241–276. doi:10.1111/j.1467-9965.1993.tb00044.x.
- Sanford J. Grossman; John Y. Campbell; Jiang Wang (1993). "Trading Volume and Serial Correlation in Stock Returns". Quarterly Journal of Economics. CVIII (4): 905–939. doi:10.3386/w4193.
- Sanford J. Grossman (1995). "Dynamic Asset Allocation and the Informational Efficiency of Markets". Journal of Finance. L (3): 773–787. CiteSeerX 10.1.1.508.6741. doi:10.1111/j.1540-6261.1995.tb04036.x.
- Sanford J. Grossman; Zhongquan Zhou (1996). "Equilibrium Analysis of Portfolio Insurance". Journal of Finance. LI (4): 1379–1403. doi:10.1111/j.1540-6261.1996.tb04073.x.
