= Jacques Drèze =

Belgian economist (1929–2022)

Jacques H. Drèze
- Jacques Drèze
- Born: 5 August 1929; Verviers, Belgium
- Died: 25 September 2022 (aged 93); Verviers, Belgium

Academic background
- Education: Université de Liège (Licencié); Columbia University (PhD)
- Doctoral advisor: William Vickrey
- Influences: Kenneth J. Arrow; Robert J. Aumann; Edmond Malinvaud; Franco Modigliani; Leonard Jimmie Savage

Academic work
- Discipline: Economic theory Economic policy Econometrics; Statistics; Operations research
- School or tradition: Mathematical economics
- Institutions: Center for Operations Research and Econometrics, Université catholique de Louvain; University of Chicago (1963–1968); Cornell University (1971–1977)
- Doctoral students: Franz Palm
- Notable ideas: Drèze equilibrium with price rationing Disequilibrium macroeconomics and econometrics Policies to combat unemployment Public economics Bayesian simultaneous equations
- Awards: President, Econometric Society (1970); President, International Economic Association (1996–1999) (Inaugural) President, European Economic Association (1985–1986); Walras-Bowley Lecture (1976); Yrjö Jahnsson Lecturer (1983); Foreign Honorary Member of the American Economic Association; Foreign Associate, National Academy of Sciences (1993); Foreign Honorary Member, American Academy of Arts and Sciences; Foreign Member, Royal Dutch Academy of Arts and Sciences; Corresponding Fellow, British Academy (1990)
- Website: Information at IDEAS / RePEc

Jacques H. Drèze (5 August 1929 – 25 September 2022) was a Belgian economist noted for his contributions to economic theory, econometrics, and economic policy as well as for his leadership in the economics profession. Drèze was the first president of the European Economic Association in 1986 and was the president of the Econometric Society in 1970.

Jacques Drèze was also the father of five sons. One son is the economist, Jean Drèze, who is known for his work on poverty and hunger in India (some of which has been in collaboration with Amartya K. Sen); another son, Xavier Drèze, was a professor of marketing at UCLA.

== Contributions to economics ==
Drèze's contributions to economics combine policy relevance and mathematical techniques.

Indeed, models basically play the same role in economics as in fashion: they provide an articulated frame on which to show off your material to advantage ... ; a useful role, but fraught with the dangers that the designer may get carried away by his personal inclination for the model, while the customers may forget that the model is more streamlined than reality.

=== Economics of uncertainty and insurance ===
Between games of strategy and games against nature, there remains a middle ground where uncertainties are partially controllable by the decision-maker—situations labelled "games of strength and skill" by von Neumann and Morgenstern, or "moral hazard" in subsequent work. Such problems of moral hazard have been discussed by Jacques Drèze in his dissertation, leading to the 1961 paper (8), whose analysis was generalized in 1987 (76), and simplified in 2004 (123). Drèze's theory allows for preferences depending on the state of the environment. Rational behaviour is again characterised by subjective expected utility maximisation, where the utility is state-dependent, and the maximisation encompasses the choice of an optimal subjective probability from an underlying feasible set.

With reference to state-dependent preferences and moral hazard, a natural application of long-standing interest to economists concerns the provision of safety, for instance through road investments that are aimed at saving lives. In this area, Jacques Drèze introduced in 1962 (12) the "willingness-to-pay" approach, which is now widely adopted. That approach rests on individual preferences aggregated as per the theory of public goods. The willingness to pay approach thus fits squarely in economic theory.

The work of Jacques Drèze on the economics of uncertainty through the mid-eighties is collected in his volume Essays on Economic Decisions under Uncertainty (B2), published in 1987.

The book is organised in seven parts, covering successively decision theory, market allocation, consumption, production, the firm under incomplete markets, labor and public decisions. Under market allocation comes an important paper (21) on the interpretation and properties of the general equilibrium model pioneered in Arrow (1953). The more significant piece in the next part is a classic paper with Franco Modigliani on savings and portfolio choice under uncertainty (28). There follow three papers on industry equilibrium (17, 42, 62).

In 1975 Drèze contributed "the first general equilibrium analysis of quantity rationing necessitated by prices failing to adjust to equate supply and demand", which "have introduced significant elements of realism to the basic model, . . . given insight, and . . . have had a major impact on subsequent work. For example, the fix-price approach to Keynesian macroeconomics . . . grows largely out of the Drèze paper."

In the early seventies, motivated by the potential role of price rigidities for enhancing risk-sharing efficiency, Jacques Drèze undertook to define equilibria with price rigidities and quantity constraints and to study their properties in a general equilibrium context. His 1975 paper (36, circulated in 1971) introduces the so-called "Drèze equilibrium" at which supply (resp. demand) is constrained only when prices are downward (resp. upward) rigid, whereas a preselected commodity (e.g. money) is never rationed. Existence is proved for arbitrary bounds on prices, through an original approach repeatedly used ever since. That paper is a widely cited classic. It was followed by several others (51, 55, 63, 75), exploring the properties of the new concept. Of particular significance to future developments is a joint paper with Pierre Dehez (55), which establishes the existence of Drèze equilibria with no rationing of the demand side. These are called "supply-constrained equilibria". They correspond to the empirically relevant macroeconomic situations.

== Macroeconomic consequences of microeconomics ==
In the meantime, Jean-Pascal Bénassy (1975) and Yves Younès (1975) had approached the same problem from a macroeconomic angle, for the more restrictive case of fixed prices. There developed a lively interest in fixed price economies, and specifically in a three-good macroeconomic model, first formulated by Robert Barro and Herschel Grossman (1971) and then studied extensively by Edmond Malinvaud (1977). That model invited empirical estimation. The new statistical challenges posed by "disequilibrium econometrics" were attacked at CORE by two students of Jacques Drèze, namely Henri Sneessens (1981) and Jean-Paul Lambert (1988). Following a joint paper by Drèze and Sneessens (71), a major project (the European Unemployment Program) directed by Jacques Drèze and Richard Layard led to the estimation of a common disequilibrium model in ten countries (B4, 93, 94). The results of that successful effort were to inspire policy recommendations in Europe for several years.

The next steps in the theoretical research came with the work of John Roberts on supply-constrained equilibria at competitive prices, and then with the dissertation of Jean-Jacques Herings at Tilburg (1987, 1996). In both cases, there appear results on the existence of a continuum of Drèze equilibria.

Following the work of Roberts and Herings, Drèze (113) proved the existence of equilibria with arbitrarily severe rationing of supply. Next, in a joint paper with Herings and others (132), Drèze established the generic existence of a continuum of Pareto-ranked supply-constrained equilibria for a standard economy with some fixed prices.

An intuitive explanation of that surprising result is this: if some prices are fixed and the remaining are flexible, the level of the latter prices relative to the former introduces a degree of freedom that accounts for the multiplicity of equilibria; globally, less rationing is associated with a higher price level; the multiplicity of equilibria thus formalises a trade-off between inflation and unemployment, comparable to a Phillips curve. In this analysis, the continuum is interpreted as reflecting coordination failures, not short-run price dynamics à la Phillips. The fact that price-wage rigidities can sustain coordination failures adds a new twist to explanations of involuntary unemployment. At the same time, multiple equilibria create problems for the definition of expectations, and introduce a new dimension of uncertainty.

Starting with a paper in Econometrica by Dierker, Guesnerie and Neuefeind (1985), a theory of general equilibrium has developed for economies with non-convex production sets, where firms follow well-defined pricing rules. In particular, the existence theorems of increasing generality cover (to some extent, because of various differences in assumptions) the case of Ramsey-Boiteux pricing. Those interested primarily in applications might express skepticism, perhaps even horrified skepticism, upon realizing that 90 pages of a serious economics journal—a 1988 issue of The Journal of Mathematical Economics---were devoted to existence proofs of equilibrium in non-convex economies, under alternative formulations of the assumption that marginal cost pricing entails bounded losses at normalized prices. Still, I think that economic research must cover the whole spectrum from concrete applications to that level of abstraction.

== Theory of the firm ==
Drèze gave a public lecture on "Human Capital and Risk Bearing" (48). The innovative idea here is the transposition of the reasoning underlying the theory of "implicit labour contracts" to the understanding of wage rigidities and unemployment benefits. When markets are incomplete, so that workers cannot insure the risks associated with their future terms of employment, competitive clearing of spot labour markets is not the second-best efficient: wage rigidities cum unemployment benefits offer scope for improvement.

The lecture develops this theme informally. The conclusion, stated with specific reference to labour markets, has more general validity. It applies to any situation where the uninsurable uncertainty about future prices results in welfare costs. Even though price rigidities entail a loss of productive efficiency, this can be more than offset by a gain of efficiency in risk-sharing. What may be specific to the labour market is the realistic possibility of controlling (minimum) wages and organising unemployment compensation. The analysis implies that the claim that wage flexibility is efficient requires qualification.

For "price-wage rigidities", the presence of rigidities receives an explanation in Section Seven of Drèze's lecture: Under incomplete markets, wage rigidities contribute to risk-sharing efficiency. The theme of the 1979 lecture (48) is taken up in several papers (91, 95, 101), exploring the definition and implementation of second-best wage rigidities.

Since then, Jacques Drèze has examined ways of reconciling flexibility of labour costs to firms with risk-sharing efficiency of labour incomes, if needed through wage subsidies (119, 125, 131).

== Disequilibrium ==
Drèze has suggested that research needs both to search for "microeconomic foundations for macroeconomics" and to consider the "macroeconomic consequences of microeconomics", and Drèze had contributed to the latter project of macroeconomic consequences of microeconomics.

In the early seventies, motivated by the potential role of price rigidities for enhancing risk-sharing efficiency, Jacques Drèze undertook to define equilibria with price rigidities and quantity constraints and to study their properties in a general equilibrium context. His 1975 paper (36, circulated in 1971) introduces the so-called "Drèze equilibrium" at which supply (resp. demand) is constrained only when prices are downward (resp. upward) rigid, whereas a preselected commodity (e.g. money) is never rationed. Existence is proved for arbitrary bounds on prices, through an original approach repeatedly used ever since. That paper is a widely cited classic. It was followed by several others (51, 55, 63, 75), exploring the properties of the new concept. Of particular significance to future developments is a joint paper with Pierre Dehez (55), which establishes the existence of Drèze equilibria with no rationing of the demand side. These are called "supply-constrained equilibria". They correspond to the empirically relevant macroeconomic situations.

In the meantime, Jean-Pascal Bénassy (1975) and Yves Younès (1975) had approached the same problem from a macroeconomic angle, for the more restrictive case of fixed prices. There developed a lively interest in fixed price economies, and specifically in a three-good macroeconomic model, first formulated by Robert Barro and Herschel Grossman (1971) and then studied extensively by Edmond Malinvaud (1977). That model invited empirical estimation. The new statistical challenges posed by "disequilibrium econometrics" were attacked at CORE by two students of Jacques Drèze, namely Henri Sneessens (1981) and Jean-Paul Lambert (1988). Following a joint paper by Drèze and Sneessens (71), a major project (the European Unemployment Program) directed by Jacques Drèze and Richard Layard led to the estimation of a common disequilibrium model in ten countries (B4, 93, 94). The results of that successful effort were to inspire policy recommendations in Europe for several years.

The next steps in the theoretical research came with the work of John Roberts on supply-constrained equilibria at competitive prices, and then with the dissertation of Jean-Jacques Herings at Tilburg (1987, 1996). In both cases, there appear results on the existence of a continuum of Drèze equilibria. Following these leads, Drèze (113) proved the existence of equilibria with arbitrarily severe rationing of supply. Next, in a joint paper with Herings and others (132), the generic existence of a continuum of Pareto-ranked supply-constrained equilibria was established for a standard economy with some fixed prices. An intuitive explanation of that surprising result is this: if some prices are fixed and the remaining are flexible, the level of the latter prices relative to the former introduces a degree of freedom that accounts for the multiplicity of equilibria; globally, less rationing is associated with a higher price level; the multiplicity of equilibria thus formalises a trade-off between inflation and unemployment, comparable to a Phillips curve.

== Econometrics and the European Unemployment Programme ==
Two young French economists, Jean-Pascal Bénassy (1975) and Yves Younès (1975), approached the same problem from a macroeconomic angle, for the more restrictive case of fixed prices. There developed a lively interest in fixed-price economies, and specifically in a three-good macroeconomic model, first formulated by Robert Barro and Herschel Grossman (1971) and then studied extensively by Edmond Malinvaud (1977).

That model invited empirical estimation. The new statistical challenges posed by "disequilibrium econometrics" were attacked at CORE by two students of Jacques Drèze, namely Henri Sneessens (1981) and Jean-Paul Lambert (1988), whose dissertations were published and widely read. Drèze and Sneessens proposed and estimated a disequilibrium model of Belgium's open economy (71). This model became the prototypical model estimated by the European Unemployment Programme, which under the guidance of Drèze and Richard Layard developed similar models for ten countries (B4, 93, 94). The results of that successful effort were to inspire policy recommendations in Europe for several years.

Following the emergence of European unemployment in the 1970s, Jacques Drèze worked with Franco Modigliani on macroeconomic policies. There resulted a paper (56), which contains some methodological innovations (an early formulation of the "union-wage model", and Bayesian synthesis of classical estimates from several models). It also contains an innovative discussion of work sharing, a topic to which Drèze returned in (73).

In the 1980s and early 1990s, Drèze wrote about the policy front, campaigning for two-sided policies of demand stimulation and supply-side restructuring (100). With Edmond Malinvaud, Drèze organized a group of thirteen Belgian and French economists who wrote "Growth and employment: the scope for a European initiative" (103, 104): This position paper advocated an ambitious program of public investments coupled with the elimination of social security contributions by employees on minimum wages. That paper has influenced the programs of reduced contributions on low wages introduced recently in several countries, especially France and Belgium.

The logic of these two-handed policies stands out more sharply in the light of the work on coordination failures (124, section 6). These failures are more naturally remedied through demand stimulation. But the failures are apt to be recurrent, so that deficit spending could lead to continued growth of the public debt. Accordingly, demand stimulation should take the form of socially profitable investments, with returns covering the debt service. Substituting profitable investments and variable social security contributions for deficit spending and straight wage rigidities, the proposed two-handed policies differ from either orthodox Keynesianism or New Keynesian policies.

I am impressed by the depth and breadth of knowledge that a serious public economist dreams of commanding. The methodological spectrum includes at one end practical and institutional aspects of public utility pricing, taxation or health care provision, which give the field its substantive content. The real problems encountered in these and many other areas offer scope for the general equilibrium mathematical analysis of second-best policies. At the far end of the spectrum is abstract modelling of economies with non-convex technologies or uncertainty and incomplete markets. Confronted by this spectrum, duly illustrated here, I feel neither despairing nor resigned to narrow specialization, but probably over-extended.

== Bayesian econometrics of simultaneous equations ==
One important by-product of the theory of rational decisions under uncertainty has been the emergence of the Bayesian approach to statistics, which views problems of statistical decision as no different from other decision problems, and problems of statistical inference as concerned with the revision of subjective probabilities on the basis of observations.

Bayesian analysis of structural econometric models raises specific difficulties, linked to the so-called "identification problem", readily illustrated by a single market: we observe prices and quantities at the intersection of supply and demand, whereas we wish to estimate the demand and supply curves. The development of suitable Bayesian methods for this problem followed circulation in 1962 of a discussion paper by Drèze, fully developed in several subsequent papers (34, 39, 41, 61). The "Drèze Prior" is introduced in (39).

== Leadership ==
Jacques Drèze has been involved in helping to found several institutions that have strengthened economic research in Europe, notably the Center for Operations Research and Econometrics (CORE), the European Doctoral Program in Quantitative Economics (EDP) and the European Economic Association (EEA).

CORE was created in 1966, and rapidly grew into a leading research centre of international significance. Jacques Drèze was the instigator, the organiser, the first Director and a long-time President of CORE. His outside connections were critical in gathering outside support and attracting foreign members or visitors.

As expressed by Robert Aumann, CORE is "a unique breeding ground; a place where cross-fertilisation leads to the conception of new ideas, as well as a womb – a warm, supportive environment in which these ideas can grow and mature". The research output at CORE since 1966 consists to date of some 110 books, 125 doctoral dissertations, and 1700 published articles; Discussion Papers now average 85 per year.

Also, CORE has served as a model, emulated in other European countries, often at the hands of former CORE members or visitors: Bonn, for GREQAM in Marseille, CentER at Tilburg or Delta in Paris.

== Doctoral study and the European Doctoral Program in Quantitative Economics ==
It is also at CORE, and again at the initiative of Jacques Drèze, that EDP was conceived in 1975. Two ideas came together:

- An institution should not organise its own doctoral program if it cannot do as well as leading institutions elsewhere.
- Education for research is greatly enhanced if students attend at least two institutions, being thereby led to hear confronting opinions and form their own!

These ideas were realised under EDP, where several universities organise a joint doctoral program, with all students attending at least two institutions and having access to supervisors from both. Some 120 students have graduated under this program, which again has been emulated by others in Europe.

== European Economic Association ==
In 1985 the EEA was conceived by Jean Gabszewicz and Jacques Thisse, both of CORE. The first secretary was CORE's Louis Phlips and Jacques Drèze was the first President. Today the EEA sponsors the Journal of the European Economic Association (JEEA), holds annual meetings, and organizes summer schools for young researchers.

== Personal biography ==
Born in Verviers (Belgium) in 1929, Jacques Drèze did undergraduate economics at the nearby Université de Liège, and then a PhD at Columbia University, with a thesis on "Individual Decision Making under Partially Controllable Uncertainty" supervised by William Vickrey. After a first academic job at Carnegie Mellon University in Pittsburgh, he joined Université Catholique de Louvain in 1958, and stayed there for the rest of his life—apart from visiting appointments at Northwestern University, the University of Chicago, and Cornell University. He retired from teaching and administration in 1989 at the age of 60. Since retirement, he remained active in research. His son Jean wrote that he planned a magnus opus tentatively titled Uncertainty and Economic Policies: General Equilibrium, Incomplete Markets and Macroeconomics, but never completed it.

In 1980 he became Foreign Member of the Royal Netherlands Academy of Arts and Sciences.

Jacques Drèze had five sons, including the economist and anti-hunger activist Jean Drèze, who has collaborated on three books with Amartya K. Sen. His first son, Benoît Drèze is a Belgian politician. Another son, Xavier Drèze, was a marketing professor at UCLA.

Drèze died on 25 September 2022, at the age of 93.

== Bibliography ==
=== Books by Jacques Drèze ===
These enumerated citations and comments were based on the curriculum vitae of Jacques Drèze (2009-03-06):

- 1. Allocation under Uncertainty: Equilibrium and Optimality (Ed.), Macmillan, London, 1974.
- 2. Essays on Economic Decisions under Uncertainty, Cambridge University Press, Cambridge, 1987.
  - Twenty reprinted papers, organised under 7 headings: individual decision theory, markets and prices, consumer decisions, producer decisions, theory of the firm, human capital and labour contracts, and public decisions.
- 3. Labour Management, Contracts and Capital Markets, A General Equilibrium Approach, Oxford, 1989.
  - An extended version of the 1983 Yrjö Jahnsson Lectures, dealing with the pure theory of labour-managed, then stock-market economies; stock-market economics with labour contracts; labour management versus labour contracts under incomplete capital markets; and some macroeconomic aspects.
- 4. Europe's Unemployment Problem (Ed.), MIT Press, Cambridge (Mass.), 1990. (With C. Bean, J.P. Lambert, F. Mehta and H. Sneessens, Eds)
  - Papers prepared under the European Unemployment Program, a 10-country research initiative supervised by Richard Layard and Drèze in 1986–88. The country papers adopted a common econometric framework inspired by work on Belgium by Drèze and Henri Sneesens (see article [71]). Includes a 65-page synthesis by Charles Bean and Drèze.
- 5. Underemployment Equilibria: Essays in Theory, Econometrics and Policy, Cambridge University Press, Cambridge, 1991.
  - Eighteen reprinted papers, organised under 8 headings: overview, equilibria with price rigidities, efficiency of constrained equilibria, public goods and the public sector, price adjustments, wage policies, econometrics, and policy.
- 6. Money and Uncertainty: Inflation, Interest, Indexation, Edizioni Dell' Elefante, Roma, 1992.
  - An extended version of the 1992 Paolo Baffi Lecture at Banca d'Italia, dealing successively with a positive theory of positive inflation, with interest rates policies and with wage indexation.
- 7. Pour l'emploi, la croissance et l'Europe, De Boeck Université, 1995.
  - Ten papers (some initially written in French, some translated from English) dealing successively with growth and employment, technical progress and low-skilled employment, European macroeconomic policies, work sharing, Europe's capital city and a status for regions within a Europe of nations. Most papers are based on lectures addressed to non-specialist audiences.

=== Selected articles by Jacques Drèze ===
These enumerated citations and comments come from the curriculum vitae of Jacques Drèze (2009-03-06):

- 7. "Quelques réflexions sereines sur l'adaptation de l'industrie belge au Marché Commun", Comptes Rendus de la Société d'Economie Politique de Belgique, Bruxelles, 275, 3–37, 1960; translated as "The Standard Goods Hypothesis" in The European Internal Market: Trade and Competition, Eds. A. Jacquemin and A. Sapir, 13–32, Oxford University Press, Oxford,1989.
  - Product differentiation and economies of scale as a new source of comparative advantage—a pillar of the extensive theory of "intra-industry trade", and of some more recent developments following the paper by Krugman in AER 1970.
- 8. "Les fondements logiques de l'utilité cardinale et de la probabilité subjective", in La Decision, Colloques Internationaux du CNRS, Paris, 73–97, 1961.
  - Extension of individual decision theory to moral hazard and state-dependent preferences, based on unpublished PhD Thesis, revised and more systematically presented in [76].
- 12. "L'utilité sociale d'une vie humaine", Revue Francaise de Recherche Opérationnelle, 23, 93–118, 1962.
  - Introduces the "willingness to pay" approach to the demand for safety.
- 13. "Some Postwar Contributions of French Economists to Theory and Public Policy", American Economic Review, 54, 2, 1–64, 1964.
  - An extensive review (with some extensions) of the work of the French marginalist school (Allais, Boiteux, Massé, ...), with additional sections on intertemporal allocation (Allais, Malinvaud, ...) and French planning.
- 21. "Market Allocation under Uncertainty", European Economic Review, 2, 2, 133–165, 1971.
  - Interpretation of the Arrow-Debreu contingent-markets model. An early statement and demonstration of the martingale property of prices for contingent claims.
- 23. "A Tâtonnement Process for Public Goods", Review of Economic Studies, 38, 2, 133–150, 1971. (With D. de la Vallèe Poussin.)
  - Introduces the well-known MDP process for public goods, demonstrates convergence and provides an early analysis of incentive compatibility.
- 25. "Discount Rates for Public Investments in Closed and Open Economies", Economica, 38, 152, 395–412, 1971; reprinted in Cost-Benefit Analysis, A.C. Harberger and G.P. Jenkins Eds, Edward, 2002, and in Discounting and Environmental Policy, J. Scheraga, Ed., Ashgate, 2002. (With A. Sandmo.)
  - Second-best analysis of the choice of a discount rate for public investment (previously confined to partial analysis). The social discount rate should be a weighted average of rates of return on specific investments, with weights reflecting marginal shares.
- 26. "Cores and Prices in an Exchange Economy with an Atomless Sector", Econometrica 40, 6, 1090–1108, 1972. (With J. Jaskold Gabszewicz, D. Schmeidler and K. Vind.)
  - For an exchange economy with both an atomless sector and atoms, the paper gives alternative sufficient conditions for a core allocation to have a competitive restriction to the atomless sector.
- 27. "Econometrics and Decision Theory", Econometrica, 40, 1, 1–17, 1972.
  - Presidential address to the Econometric Society; summarises Drèze's work on Bayesian Econometrics (see also [61]) and expounds complementarities between economic theory, decision theory, econometrics and mathematical programming.
- 28. "Consumption Decisions under Uncertainty", Journal of Economic Theory, 5, 3, 308–335, 1972. (With F. Modigliani.)
  - Clearly distinguished time preferences from risk preferences and temporal versus timeless uncertainty, while expounding results on savings and portfolio choices under uncertainty.
- 33. "Investment under Private Ownership: Optimality, Equilibrium and Stability" in Allocation under Uncertainty: Equilibrium and Optimality, Macmillan, chap. 9, 1974.
  - Develops the "incomplete markets" model of general equilibrium under uncertainty, with a single commodity per state, as an extension of the special model (fixed coefficients) introduced in the seminal paper by Diamond in AER 1967; proves basic results (most notably non-convexity, but also existence of stockholders equilibria, their inefficiency, and stability of stock-market valuation of investments.)
- 34. "Bayesian Theory of Identification in Simultaneous Equations Models" in Studies in Bayesian Econometrics and Statistics, Eds. S.E. Fienberg and A. Zellner, North-Holland, 1974.
  - Based on an unpublished manuscript of 1962. Introduces the Bayesian concept of identification and applies it to SEM; together with [39, 41, 44], forms the core of the material summarised in [61] and outlined in [27].
- 36. "Existence of an Exchange Equilibrium under Price rigidities", International Economic Review, 16, 2, 301–320, 1975.
  - Introduces an equilibrium concept for market economies operating under price rigidities (the so-called Drèze equilibrium) and a now widely used method of proving existence. Covers both real and nominal rigidities defined by upper and/or lower bounds on individual prices.
- 38. "Pricing, Spending and Gambling Rules for Non-Profit Organisations" in Public and Urban Economics, Essays in Honor of William S. Vickrey, Ed. R.E. Grieson, Lexington Books, 59–89, 1976. (With M. Marchand.)
  - Second-best theory applied to non-profit organisations, including Ramsey-Boiteux pricing, criteria for capital accumulation or consumption and guidelines for risk-taking.
- 39. "Bayesian Limited Information Analysis of the Simultaneous Equations Model", Econometrica 44, 5, 1045–1075, 1976.
  - The fundamental paper on Bayesian methods for SEM, including the use of ratio-form poly-t densities.
- 40. "Some Theory of Labour Management and Participation", Econometrica, 44, 6, 1125–1139, 1976.
  - Walras lecture to the 1975 World Congress of the Econometric Society. Preview of book [3]. Includes the first general-equilibrium analysis of labour management. Under labour mobility across firms, labour-management equilibria replicate competitive equilibria.
- 41. "Bayesian Full Information Analysis of Simultaneous Equations", Journal of the American Statistical Association 71, 345, 919–923, 1976. (With J.-A. Morales.)
  - Extension of [39] from limited to full information: a broader class of prior densities and a more informative analysis, at greater computational cost.

=== Vision and projects ===
- "From uncertainty to macroeconomics and back: an interview with Jacques Drèze", Pierre Dehez and Omar Licandro. Macroeconomic Dynamics, 9, 2005, 429–461.
- Jacques H. Drèze. 1972. "Econometrics and decision theory [Presidential address to the Econometric Society]" Econometrica, 40(1): 1–18. [J. H. Drèze 1987. Essays on Economic Decisions Under Uncertainty. Cambridge UP]:
- Jacques H. Drèze. 1987. "Underemployment Equilibria: From Theory to Econometrics and Policy" [First Congress of the European Economic Association, Presidential Address] European Economic Review, 31: 9–34. In Drèze 1993
- Gérard Debreu. 1991. "Address in honor of Jacques Drèze". Pages 3–6 in W. A. Barnett, B. Cornet, C. D'Aspremont, J. Gabszewicz, A. Mas-Colell, eds. Equilibrium Theory and Applications. Cambridge U. P.

=== Unemployment ===
- Jacques H. Drèze, Charles R. Bean, JP Lambert. 1990. Europe's Unemployment Problem. MIT Press. This book has chapter versions of the following refereed articles:
  - Henri R. Sneessens and Jacques H. Drèze. 1986. "A Discussion of Belgian unemployment, combining traditional concepts and disequilibrium econometrics." Economica 53: S89—S119. [Supplement: Charles Bean, Richard Layard, and Stephen Nickell, eds. 1986. The Rise in Unemployment. Blackwell]
  - Jacques H. Drèze and Charles Bean. 1990. "European unemployment: Lessons from a multicountry econometric study." Scandinavian Journal of Economics Vol 92, No. 2: 135–165 [Bertil Holmlund and Garl-Gustaf Löfgren, eds. Unemployment and Wage Determination in Europe. Blackwell. 3–33. In Dréze 1993.]
- Jacques H. Drèze. 1993. Underemployment Equilibria: Essays in Theory, Econometrics, and Policy. Cambridge UP. This collection contains the following essay:
  - Jacques H. Drèze; Torsten Persson; Marcus Miller. "Work-Sharing: Some Theory and Recent European Experience". Economic Policy, Vol. 1, No. 3 (Oct. 1986), pp. 561–619.

==== Dissertations of PhD students ====
- Sneessens, Henri B. 1981. Theory and Estimation of Macroeconomic Rationing Models. Springer-Verlag Lecture Notes in Economics and Mathematical Systems, Volume 191.
- Lambert, Jean-Paul. 1988. Disequilibrium Macroeconomic Models: Theory and Estimation of Rationing Models Using Business Survey Data. Cambridge UP.

=== Economic policy, especially for Europe ===
- Drèze, Jacques H.; Malinvaud, Edmond. 1994. 'Growth and employment: The scope for a European initiative', European Economic Review 38, 3–4: 489–504.
- Drèze, Jacques; Malinvaud, E.; De Grauwe, P.; Gevers, L.; Italianer, A.; Lefebvre, O.; Marchand, M.; Sneesens, H.; Steinherr, A.; Champsaur, Paul; Charpin, J.-M.; Fitoussi, J.-P.; Laroque, G. (1994). "Growth and employment: the scope for a European initiative". European Economy, Reports and Studies. 1: 75–106.
- Drèze, Jacques H.; Henri Sneessens (1996). 'Technical development, competition from low-wage economies and low-skilled unemployment', Swedish Economic Policy Review. 185–214.
- Drèze, Jacques H. (2000). "Economic and social security in the twenty-first century, with attention to Europe". Scandinavian Journal of Economics. 102 (3): 327–348. CiteSeerX 10.1.1.21.7509. doi:10.1111/1467-9442.00204.

=== Theory of the firm, especially labour in the firm ===
- Jacques H. Drèze (1989). Labour Management, Contracts, and Capital Markets: A General Equilibrium Approach. B. Blackwell. ISBN 978-0-631-13784-9.
- Dreze, Jacques H. (1976). "Some Theory of Labor Management and Participation". Econometrica. 44 (6): 1125–1139. doi:10.2307/1914250. ISSN 0012-9682. JSTOR 1914250.
- Dreze, Jacques H. (1985). "(Uncertainty and) The Firm in General Equilibrium Theory" (PDF). The Economic Journal. 95 (Supplement: Conference Papers (1985)): 1–20. doi:10.2307/2232866. JSTOR 2232866. Archived from the original (PDF) on 6 October 2017.

=== Public economics ===
- Dreze, Jacques (1997). "Research and Development in Public Economics: William Vickrey's Inventive Quest of Efficiency". Scandinavian Journal of Economics. 99 (2): 179–198. doi:10.1111/1467-9442.00057. ISSN 0347-0520.
- Dreze, Jacques H. (Spring 1995). "Forty years of public economics: A personal perspective". The Journal of Economic Perspectives. 9 (2): 111–130. doi:10.1257/jep.9.2.111. JSTOR 2138169.
- Dreze, H.; de la Vallee Poussin, D. (April 1971). "A Tâtonnement Process for Public Goods". The Review of Economic Studies. 38 (2): 133–150. doi:10.2307/2296777. JSTOR 2296777.

==== Planning and regional economics ====
- Jacques Drèze; Paul De Grauwe; Jeremy Edwards. "Regions of Europe: A Feasible Status, to Be Discussed". Economic Policy, Vol. 8, No. 17 (Oct. 1993), pp. 265–307
- Abraham Charnes; Jacques Drèze; Merton Miller. "Decision and Horizon Rules for Stochastic Planning Problems: A Linear Example". Econometrica, Vol. 34, No. 2. (Apr. 1966), pp. 307–330.

=== Statistics and Bayesian econometrics: Simultaneous equations and the Louvain School ===
- JHD. "Bayesian Limited Information Analysis of the Simultaneous Equations Model". Econometrica, Vol. 44, No. 5 (Sep. 1976), pp. 1045–1075.
- JHD and Juan-Antonio Morales. "Bayesian Full Information Analysis of Simultaneous Equations". Journal of the American Statistical Association. Vol. 71, No. 356 (Dec. 1976), pp. 919–923.
- JHD and Jean-François Richard. 1983. "Bayesian Analysis of Simultaneous Equation Systems". Chapter 9, pages 517–598, in Handbook of Econometrics, Volume I, edited by Zvi Griliches and Michael D. Intriligator. (Book 2 of Handbooks in Economics, edited by Kenneth J. Arrow and Michael D. Intriligator) North-Holland.

==== Colleagues ====
- Luc Bauwens, Michel Lubrano, Jean-François Richard. 1999. Bayesian Inference in Dynamic Econometric Models. Oxford University Press. (JHD wrote the "Foreword", pages v–vi)
- Jean Pierre Florens, Michel Mouchart, Jean-Marie Rolin. 1990. Elements of Bayesian Statistics. Pure and Applied Mathematics, Volume 134. Marcel Dekker.

=== CORE ===
- Bernard Cornet and Henry Tulkens, eds. Contributions to Operations Research and Economics. The twentieth anniversary of CORE. Papers from the symposium held in Louvain-la-Neuve, January 1987. Edited by. MIT Press, Cambridge, MA, 1989. xii+561 pp. ISBN 0-262-03149-3
