= Franz Palm =

Dutch economist

Franz C. Palm
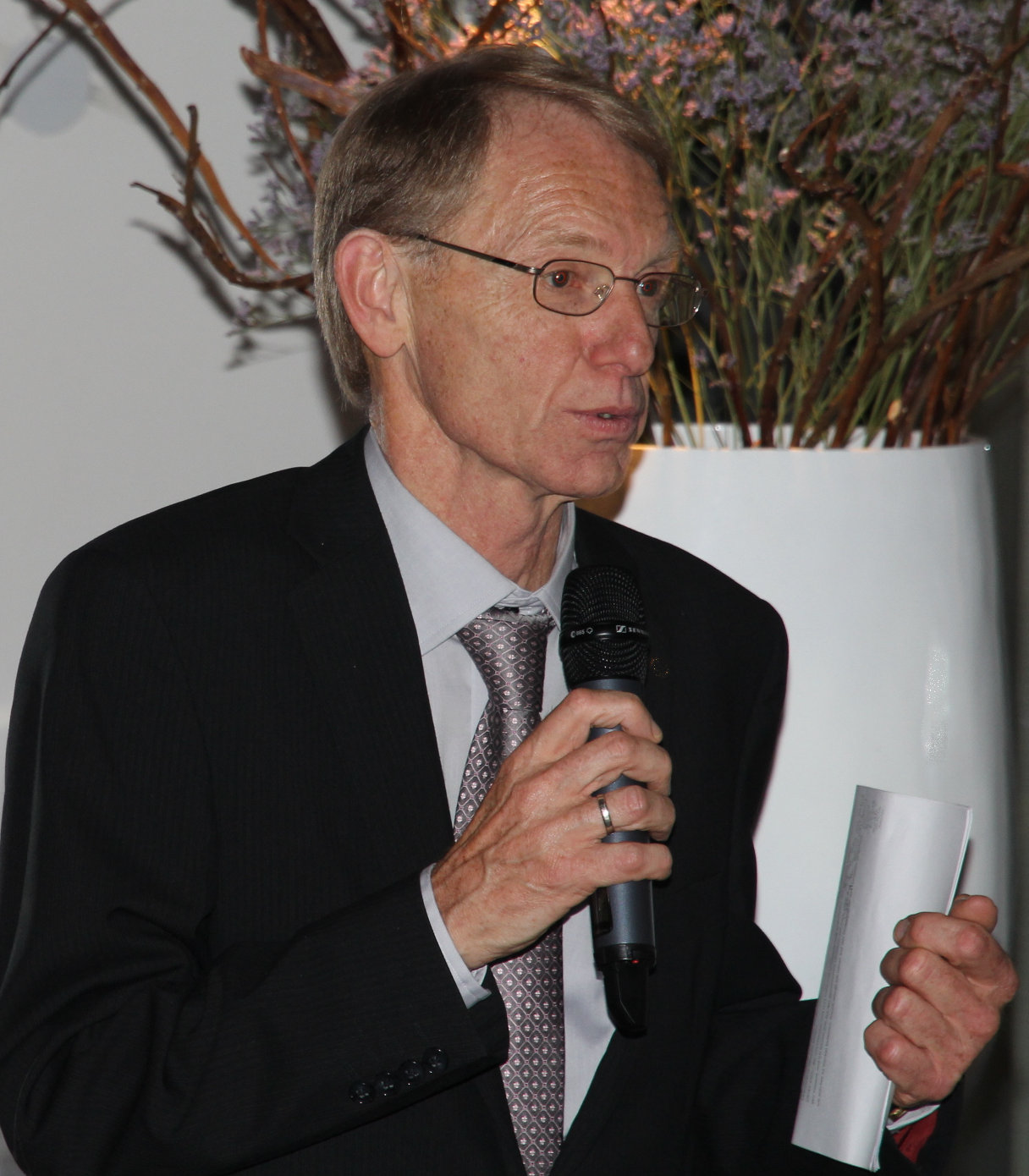
- Born: May 15, 1948 (age 78); Büllingen, Liège, Belgium

Academic background
- Education: Université Catholique de Louvain
- Influences: Jacques Drèze; Arnold Zellner

Academic work
- Discipline: Econometrics
- Institutions: Maastricht University, Free University Amsterdam, University of Amsterdam, Université Catholique de Louvain, University of Chicago
- Website: Information at IDEAS / RePEc

Franz Christian Palm (born May 15, 1948) is a Belgian economist and econometrician. He is an international authority specialised in time series econometrics and panel data.

== Biography ==
Franz Palm was a Professor of Econometrics at Maastricht University from 1985 to 2013. Before Maastricht, he worked as Professor in Econometrics at the Free University of Amsterdam from 1980 to 1985, at the University of Amsterdam as an associate professor from 1977 to 1979 and as a researcher at the Center for Operations Research and Econometrics (CORE) in Louvain-La-Neuve and at the University of Chicago.

Palm specialised in time series econometrics, developing techniques to study patterns to make predictions about the future. He was appointed Academy Professor in Econometrics by Royal Netherlands Academy of Arts and Sciences (KNAW) in 2005 and became a foreign member of the KNAW in 2000.

Franz Palm is one of the founding members of the Economic Faculty of Maastricht University where he served as a dean of the Faculty for three terms, from 1986 to 1989, from 1998 to 2001 and from 2004 to 2006. On 10 January 2017, he was honoured with an 'own' lecture hall. He co-founded the Journal of Empirical Finance in 1993, served as co-editor for the Journal of Econometrics, and the Editor-in-Chief of the oldest economic journal in the Netherlands, De Economist.

Palm earned his doctorate from the Université Catholique de Louvain in 1975, with a dissertation on Time Series Analysis and Simultaneous Equation Systems with Macroeconomic Applications. He conducted most of the research that went into this thesis at the University of Chicago (1972–74), together with Arnold Zellner.

== Awards ==
- In 2015 Palm was awarded the Ridder in the Orde van de Nederlandse Leeuw.
- Palm received a Dr. honoris causa from the Faculty of Economics and Social Sciences of the University of Freiburg in Switzerland in 2009 for his achievements in the field of statistical analysis of time series. His contributions and expertise in numerous internationally recognized scientific journals are highly valuable to the academic community and by founding one of the leading journals for applied statistics (The Journal of Empirical Finance), Palm laid the empirical foundation for this important discipline.

== Bibliography ==
- Wladimir Raymond; Jacques Mairesse; Pierre Mohnen; Franz Palm (2015). "Dynamic Models of R&D, innovation and productivity: Panel data evidence for Dutch and French manufacturing". European Economic Review. 78: 285–306.
- Franz Palm; Stephan Smeekes; Jean-Pierre Urbain (2011). "Cross-sectional dependence on robust block bootstrap panel unit root tests". Journal of Econometrics. 163: 85–104.
- Arnold Zellner; Franz Palm (2009). The Structural Econometric Time Series Analysis Approach.
- Theo Nijman; Franz Palm (1984). "Missing Observations in the Dynamic Regression Model". Econometrica. 52: 1415–1435.
- David Kodde; Franz Palm (1986). "Wald Criteria for jointly Testing Equality and Inequality Restrictions". Econometrica. 54: 1243–1248.
