= Jean Drèze =

Belgian-Indian economist (born 1959)

- Drèze in Santiniketan, 2025 (photo: Mala Mukerjee)
- Born: 22 January 1959 (age 67); Leuven, Brabant, Belgian Empire (now in Flemish Brabant, Belgium)
- Citizenship: Belgium (till 2002); India (2002-present)
- Relatives: Jacques Drèze (father)

Academic background
- Education: University of Essex (BA); Indian Statistical Institute (PhD)
- Influences: Amartya Sen

Academic work
- Discipline: Development economics

Jean Drèze (born 22 January 1959) is a Belgian-born Indian development economist and activist. He has worked on several developmental issues facing India like social welfare, poverty and gender inequality.

His co-authors include Nobel laureate in economics Amartya Sen, with whom he has written on famine, Nicholas Stern, with whom he has written on policy reform when market prices are distorted, and Nobel laureate in economics Angus Deaton. He is currently an honorary professor at the Delhi School of Economics, visiting professor at the Department of Economics, Ranchi University, and also the member of Economic Advisory Council to the Chief Minister of Tamil Nadu headed by the Nobel laureate Esther Duflo. He was a member of the National Advisory Council of India in both the terms of the UPA government, but only for a year in the first and two in the second.

== Early life ==
Jean Drèze was born on 22 January 1959 in Leuven, Belgium. He is the son of Jacques Drèze who founded the Center for Operations Research and Econometrics at the Université catholique de Louvain. His brother, Xavier Drèze, was a marketing and consumer research scholar.

He studied mathematical economics at the University of Essex in the 1980s and did his PhD (theoretical economics of cost-benefit analysis) at the Indian Statistical Institute, New Delhi.

He has lived in India since 1979 and became an Indian citizen in 2002, which meant renouncing Belgian citizenship.

== Personal life ==
He was based in Delhi (1993 to 2002) and in Allahabad (2002 to 2014). He currently lives in Ranchi. He is married to Bela Bhatia.

== Career ==
Jean Dreze - Factors which create Power for a Country?-- The Vrinda Project.

Drèze taught at the London School of Economics in the 1980s, his only full-time post, and at the Delhi School of Economics, and had been Visiting Professor at the G.B. Pant Social Science Institute, Allahabad. He was Honorary Chair Professor of the "Planning and Development Unit" created by the Planning Commission, Government of India, in the Department of Economics, University of Allahabad, India. He has made wide-ranging contributions to development economics and public economics, with special reference to India.

He has made significant contributions to the field of development economics, focusing on various critical issues such as hunger, famine, education, gender inequality, childcare, school feeding, and employment guarantee. His approach to research combines conventional economic methods, as seen in his insightful articles addressing poverty in India, with methodologies commonly employed by anthropologists.

One notable example of his interdisciplinary work is his collaboration with Nicholas Stern, Peter Lanjouw, and other researchers in studying the village of Palanpur in the Moradabad District of Uttar Pradesh, India. For this study, he immersed himself in the village, living under the same conditions as the local population. This involved farming a plot of land and raising animals, an experience that he recounted alongside Naresh Sharma in their article "Sharecropping in a North Indian Village" published in the Journal of Development Studies in October 1996.

On the 5 June 2026, Jean Drèze was awarded the Global Inequality Research Award (GiRA) during the World Inequality Conference organized at Paris School of Economics in Paris.

=== PROBE Report ===
A key work widely cited that Dreze worked on as part of a small team was the primary education study of key states in northern India typically referred to by its short name, The PROBE Report, or The Public Report on Basic Education (1999). It remains a key reference due to the lack of similarly comprehensive studies using grassroots development specialists.

=== Social activism ===
Drèze is well known for his commitment to social justice, both in India and internationally. During and after his PhD in India, he adopted a lifestyle of voluntary simplicity. While in the LSE, he frequently slept rough and lived with homeless squatters, helping to start a squatters movement in 1988 that opened buildings to the homeless and defied eviction. He wrote a short book about this movement and the life of the homeless in London, called No. 1 Clapham Road: the diary of a squat. Dreze is known for refusing luxury and, while doing fieldwork, lives and works in the same conditions as his respondents. In Delhi he and his wife Bela Bhatia had a one-room house in a jhuggi.

Apart from academic work he has been actively involved in many social movements including the peace movement, the Right to Information campaign that led to the Right to Information Act in India, the Right to Food campaign in India, among others.

During the 1990–1991 Iraq War, he joined a peace camp stationed on the Iraq-Saudi border. His 1992 article with Haris Gazdar, "Hunger and Poverty in Iraq, 1991", was one of the first assessments of Iraq's economy after the Gulf War, and an early warning about the potential human costs of the Iraq sanctions. Another book that came out of Iraq is War and Peace in the Gulf, edited by Bela Bhatia, Jean Dreze and Kathy Kelly.

Drèze was among the protesters detained in New Delhi by Delhi Police in October 2026 during demonstrations against alleged irregularities in the Special Intensive Revision of electoral rolls.

== Publications ==
Books

- Drèze J. and Sen, A.K. 1989. Hunger and Public Action. Oxford University Press.
- (as Jean Delarue) 1990. No.1 Clapham Road: The diary of a squat. Peaceprint.
- Drèze J. and Sen, A. (eds.), 1991. The Political Economy of Hunger. Three volumes. Oxford University Press.
- Ahmad E, Drèze J, Hills J, Sen A K (eds.) 1991. Social Security in Developing Countries. Oxford: Clarendon Press.
- Drèze J. and Sen, A. 1995. The political Economy of Hunger: selected essays. Clarendon Press. (abridged)
- Drèze J. and Sen, A.K. 1995. India: Economic Development and Social Opportunity. Oxford University Press.
- Dreze, Jean and Amartya Sen, (eds.), 1997. Indian Development: Selected Regional Perspectives. New Delhi: Oxford University Press.
- Drèze J., M. Samson and S. Singh, 1997. The Dam and the Nation: Displacement and Resettlement in the Narmada Valley. Delhi: Oxford University Press. ISBN 0-19-564004-7.
- A. De and J Drèze. 1999. Public Report on Basic Education in India. The PROBE report. Oxford University Press. ISBN 0195648706
- Drèze J. (ed.) 1999. The Economics of Famine. International Library of Critical Writings in Economics. London: Edward Elgar Publishing.
- Bhatia B, J. Drèze & K. Kelly. 2001. War and Peace in the Gulf: Testimonies of the Gulf Peace Team. London: Spokesman Books. [published on the tenth anniversary of the Team's attempt to stop the Gulf War through non-violent occupation].
- Drèze J. and Sen, A.K. 2002. India: Development and Participation. Oxford University Press.
- Drèze J. and Sen, A.K. 2013. An Uncertain Glory, India and Its Contradictions. Penguin.
- Drèze J., 2017. Sense And Solidarity – Jholawala Economics for Everyone. Permanent Black. ISBN 8178245213
- Drèze J. and Nirali Bakhla, Reetika Khera and Vipul Paikra, 2021. Locked Out: Emergency Report on School Education.

Articles

- Dreze, Jean and Haris Gazdar, 1997. "Uttar Pradesh: the Burden of Inertia", in Jean Dreze and Amartya Sen, (eds) Indian Development: Selected Regional Perspectives, New Delhi: Oxford University Press.
- Drèze, J. 1990. Famine Prevention in India. In Drèze J. and Sen, A. (eds.) The Political Economy of Hunger. vol 2. Oxford University Press.
- Stern, N. and Drèze J. 1991. Policy Reform, Shadow Prices and Market Prices. Journal of Public Economics.
- Drèze J., 1991. Public Action for Social Security: Foundations and Strategy. In Ahmad E, Drèze J, Hills J, Sen A K (eds.). Social Security in Developing Countries. Clarendon Press, Oxford.
- Drèze J. and H. Gazdar. 1992. Hunger and Poverty in Iraq, 1991. World Development.
- Drèze J., M. Murthi and A-C. Guio. 1995. Mortality, Fertility and Gender Bias in India. Population and Development Review.
- Dreze, Jean and Naresh Sharma, 1996, "Sharecropping in a North Indian Village", Journal of Development Studies, 33(1):1–40.
- Drèze J. and P.V. Srinivasan. 1997. Widowhood and Poverty in Rural India. Journal of Development Economics.
- Drèze J. and Sen, A.K. (eds.) 1997. Indian Development: Selected Regional Perspectives. Delhi: Oxford University Press.
- Dreze, Jean and Naresh Sharma, "Palanpur: Population, Society Economy", chapter 1 in Peter Lanjouw and Nicholas Stern, eds., Economic Development in Palanpur over Five Decades, 1998. Oxford: Clarendon Press.
- Dreze, Jean, Peter Lanjouw and Naresh Sharma. 1998. "Economic Development in Palanpur, 1957–93", chapter 2 in Peter Lanjouw and Nicholas Stern, eds., Economic Development in Palanpur over Five Decades. Oxford: Clarendon Press.
- Dreze, Jean and Naresh Sharam, "Tenancy", chapter 8 in Peter Lanjouw and Nicholas Stern, eds., Economic Development in Palanpur over Five Decades, 1998. Oxford: Clarendon Press.
- Dreze, Jean, Peter Lanjouw and Naresh Sharma, "Credit", chapter 9 in Peter Lanjouw and Nicholas Stern, eds., Economic Development in Palanpur over Five Decades, 1998. Oxford: Clarendon Press.
- Baland, J-M. Drèze J. and L. Leruth. 1999. Daily Wages and Piece Rates in Agrarian Economies. Journal of Development Economics.
- Drèze J. and R. Khera. 2000. Crime, Gender and Society in India. Population and Development Review.
- Drèze J. and G.G. Kingdon. 2001. Participation in Rural India. Review of Development Economics 5(1),1–24.
- Drèze J. 2001. Fertility, Education and Development: Evidence from India. Population and Development Review.
- Dreze, Jean "Patterns of Literacy and their Social Context", (originally written 199?), in Veena Das (ed.), 2004, Oxford Handbook of Indian Sociology, New Delhi: Oxford University Press.
- Dreze, Jean, 2002, "On Research and Action", Economic and Political Weekly, 2, 37 March (9). New Delhi.
- Deaton A. and Drèze J. 2002. Poverty and Inequality in India: A Reexamination. Economic and Political Weekly, 7 September. 3729–3748.
- Drèze J. 2003. Food Security and the Right to Food. In S. Mahendra Dev, K.P. Kannan and N. Ramachandran (eds). Toward a Food Secure India. New Delhi: Institute for Human Development.
- Drèze, Jean and Aparajita Goyal. 2003. Future of Mid-Day Meals. Economic and Political Weekly, 1 November.
- Drèze, Jean 2004. Democracy and the Right to Food. Economic and Political Weekly. 1723–1731.
- Deaton, Angus and Dreze, J. 2008. Nutrition in India: Facts and Interpretations'
- Drèze, Jean Democracy and Power: The Delhi Lectures, Introduction by Jean Dreze, Democracy and Power, Introduction
- Drèze, Jean, and Khera, Reetika. 2017. Recent Social Security Initiatives in India World Development.

== See also ==
- National Advisory Council
- National Rural Employment Guarantee Act (NREGA)
