= Isabelle Thomas =

Isabelle Thomas may refer to:

- Isabelle Thomas (geographer), professor at Université Catholique de Louvain
- Isabelle Thomas (politician), former Member of the European Parliament
- Isabelle Thomas, French victim killed in the Thomas family murders
