= Gianmarco Ottaviano =

Italian economist and professor of economics

Gianmarco Ireo Paolo Ottaviano (born in Milan on September 29, 1967) is an Italian economist and Professor of Economics at Bocconi University.

== Biography ==
A native of Milan, Gianmarco Ottaviano earned a bachelor's degree in Economic and Social Sciences from Bocconi University in 1991, followed by a M.Sc. in economics from the London School of Economics in 1993, a certificate in international economics from the Graduate Institute of International Studies in Geneva in 1994, a doctorate from Bari in 1995 and a Ph.D. in economics under Jacques-François Thisse at the Université Catholique de Louvain in 1998. He then took up a position as assistant professor of economics at the University of Bologna, followed by an associate professorship at Bocconi in 2000, and a full professorship at Bologna in 2002. In 2008, Ottaviano returned to Bocconi before moving to the London School of Economics in 2013, where he directed the Trade Programme of the Centre for Economic Performance, and back to Bocconi in 2019.

He is affiliated with the Centre for Economic Policy Research, Center for Financial Studies, Kiel Institute for the World Economy, Centre for Research and Analysis of Migration, and the Leverhulme Centre for Research on Globalisation and Economic Policy. Moreover, he is a member of the scientific advisory boards of the Central Bank Research Association and the Centre d'Etudes Prospectives et d'Informations Internationales (CEPII), among others. In terms of professional service, he performs editorial duties at Economica, the Italian Economic Journal, Spatial Economic Analysis, Regional Science and Urban Economics, Politica Economica, and the Revue Région et Développement, and has been on editorial boards of Economic Policy, International Economics, Journal of the European Economic Association, Journal of Economic Geography, Journal of Regional Science, and the Journal of Urban Economics in the past.

== Research ==
Gianmarco Ottaviano's research areas include capital movements and multinational firms, development and growth, economic integration, international trade, international migration, and regional cohesion.

=== Research on the economics of agglomeration ===
Reviewing the literature on economic geography, Ottaviano and Diego Puga reconcile the conclusions of Spence (1976) and Dixit and Stiglitz (1977): stronger competition in local product and factor markets causes spatial dispersion, though firms tend to locate close to large markets in order to take advantage of increasing returns to scale and keep trade costs low, which in turn creates pecuniary externalities fostering economic agglomeration. By affecting trade costs, economic integration then shapes the spatial location of economic activities and explains a range of patterns such as offshoring, local immigration and infra-regional development. In that context, Ottaviano and Rikard Forslid developed an extension of Krugman's classical core-periphery model through the introduction of heterogeneity in workers' skills and mobility. Moreover, Ottaviano, Takatoshi Tabuchi and Jacques-François Thisse have shown that the insights from new economic geography models à la Dixit and Stiglitz (1976) do not depend on the choice of modelling framework by developing a distinct modelling framework that yielded the same results. Ottaviano and Thisse's perspective on the relationship between agglomeration and economic geography is elaborated in a chapter of the Handbook of Regional and Urban Economics.

In another study on the link between agglomeration and growth with Philippe Martin, Ottaviano showed how both processes can be mutually self-reinforcing, as agglomeration reduces the cost of innovation and thereby raises growth, while growth further fosters agglomeration as new firms cluster close to the sector from which innovation originates. They similarly showed how growth, FDI, and industrial concentration are mediated through transaction costs and R&D spillovers, with important implications for economic development. In further work with Richard Baldwin, Ottaviano and Martin showed how the industrialization and growth take-off of rich northern countries, massive global income divergences and then convergence through trade integration can be explained through changes in trade costs.

=== Research on the economics of international trade ===
Together with Marc Melitz, Ottaviano developed a trade model in which productivity and price mark-ups respond to size and integration of a market through international trade, with higher integration enabling tougher competition and thus also changing the composition of producers and exporters in that market. Expanding this framework in further work with Thierry Mayer to firms' product mixes and range of exported products, Ottaviano and Melitz confirmed the claim that tougher competition in an export market induces firms to skew their export sales towards their best performing products, a finding that is confirmed for French exporters and bears important implications for firms' productivity. In earlier work on the internationalisation of European firms, Ottaviano and Mayer observed that a few high-performing firms drive their countries' international performance, suggesting that economic integration policies should focus on raising the number of international firms rather than "deepening" the international involvement of already internationalized firms.

=== Research on migration and diversity ===
In joint work with Giovanni Peri, Ottaviano investigated the relationship between linguistic diversity across U.S. cities and local productivity over 1970–90; together, they find that wages and employment density of U.S.-born workers were systematically higher, all else equal, in cities with higher linguistic diversity, especially for highly educated and for white workers, and that the relationship was strengthened the better non-native speakers were assimilated in terms of language skills and duration of residence. Further research by Ottaviano and Peri on the value of cultural diversity - as proxied by the diversity of countries of birth of U.S. residents - suggested that US-born citizens living in metropolitan areas with increasing shares of foreign-born residents experienced significant growth in wages and housing values. Their thinking about the effects of immigration on natives' wages turns around the notion that natives and foreigners are inherently imperfectly substitutable even within the same skill group. Using this framework, they showed that immigration to the U.S. in 1990-2006 had small negative short-run effects on native high school dropouts (-0.7%) and average wages (-0.4%), while raising the wages of native high school dropouts and average native wages in the long run by 0.3% and 0.6%, respectively, but depressing the long-run wages of previous immigrants by 6.7%. Another study by Ottaviano with Peri and Greg Wright observed that manufacturing industries with a larger increase in exposure to globalization (through offshoring or immigration) saw improvements in terms of native employment growth relative to less exposed industries. They explain this finding through a model wherein natives, immigrants and offshore workers differ systematically in their ability to apply complex skills and wherein jobs vary in the degree to which their performance requires complex skills. In this framework, the productivity effect related to more efficient task assignment - producers hiring natives, immigrants and offshore workers for different tasks according to their respective comparative advantage - may offset the displacement effect of immigration and offshoring on natives' employment. Finally, with regard to the labour market effects of immigration to Western Germany during the 1990s, Ottaviano - together with Peri and Francesco d'Amuri - found that immigration had a sizeable adverse effect on previous immigrants' employment and a small adverse effect on their wages, while having very little adverse effects on native wages and employments; the authors explain this divergence through the higher substitutability between different groups of immigrants relative to that between immigrants and natives.

== Bibliography (selected) ==
- Baldwin, R. et al. (2011). Economic Geography and Public Policy. Princeton, NJ: Princeton University Press.
