= Robert I. Webb =

Robert I. Webb is a professor of Finance at the University of Virginia. He is a Paul Tudor Jones II Research Professor at the McIntire School of Commerce of the University of Virginia. Additionally, he is the editor of the Journal of Futures Markets, published by Wiley-Blackwell. He is also the author of Macroeconomic Information and Financial Trading, Trading Catalysts: How Events Move Markets and Create Trading Opportunities and "Shock Markets: Trading Lessons for Volatile Times".

Previously he was a consultant to the World Bank and he traded on the floor at the Chicago Mercantile Exchange. He also served as a Senior Financial Economist at both the Executive Office of the President, Office of Management and Budget, and the Commodity Futures Trading Commission.

Webb received his undergraduate degree from the University of Wisconsin–Eau Claire and obtained his doctorate from the University of Chicago.
