= Claude d'Aspremont Lynden =

Belgian economist and professor

Count Claude d'Aspremont Lynden
- Born: 8 April 1946 (age 80)

Academic background
- Education: Stanford University
- Doctoral advisor: Robert B. Wilson

Academic work
- Institutions: Université catholique de Louvain
- Awards: Francqui Prize (1995)
- Website: Information at IDEAS / RePEc

Count Claude d'Aspremont Lynden (born 1946) is a Belgian economist and professor at the Universite Catholique de Louvain, Center for Operations Research and Econometrics (CORE), and Département des sciences économiques (ECON). He obtained a PhD (dissertation in decision sciences) at the Graduate School of Business, Stanford University (United States) in 1973. His research focus is mathematical economics, social choice theory, and industrial organization. In 1995, he was awarded the Francqui Prize in Human Sciences.
