= Bela Bhatia =

Indian lawyer, writer and academic

Bela Bhatia (born c. 1964) is a human rights activist and author working in the Bastar district in the state of Chhattisgarh in Central India. Her work with Adivasi and Dalit communities has brought threats against her life, which resulted in police protection and support from chief ministers of Chhattisgarh.

== Biography ==
Bhatia was born c. 1964. She studied for a PhD at Cambridge University and then worked at the Centre for the Study of Developing Societies, Delhi and an Honorary Professor at the Tata Institute of Social Sciences, Bombay. She then lived in Bastar district in the state of Chhattisgarh in Central India, working as researcher on counter-insurgency methods and human rights abuses in Adivasi and Dalit communities.

In 2017, Bhatia joined a National Human Rights Commission (NHRC) investigation interviewing women who had filed First information reports regarding sexual assault by police officers. Soon afterwards, a mob of 30 people went to her house in the village of Parpa near Jagdalpur and threatened her with violence. She was forced to leave within 24 hours. She made a police complaint which stated the vigilantes came from a local group which opposed human rights workers. This led to her receiving police protections and assurances for her safety from Chief Minister Raman Singh.

She received support from the Chief Minister of Chhattisgarh Bhupesh Baghel after she was denied access to a client at Jagdalpur prison in 2019. In the same year, she learnt that she was under surveillance by the Inidian government using Pegasus spyware.

Bhatia is co-editor (with Jean Drèze and Kathy Kelly) of War and Peace in the Gulf: Testimonies of the Gulf Peace Team published in 2001 and her book India's Forgotten Country: A View from the Margins was published in 2024 by Penguin India.

== Selected works ==
- Bhatia, Bela; Drèze, Jean; Kelly, Kathy (2001). War and Peace in the Gulf: Testimonies of the Gulf Peace Team. Spokesman Books. ISBN 9780851246406.
- Bhatia, Bela (2024). India's Forgotten Country: A View from the Margins. Viking. ISBN 978-9357084208.
