= Michael Perelman (economist) =

American economist (1939–2020)

- Born: October 1, 1939
- Died: September 21, 2020 (aged 80)
- Occupations: Business writer Professor
- Writing career
- Period: 1977–present
- Genre: Non-fiction
- Subject: Economics
- Notable works: Railroading Economics (2006); Manufacturing Discontent (2005)

Michael Perelman (October 1, 1939 - September 21, 2020) was an American economist and economic historian, former professor of economics at California State University, Chico. Perelman wrote 19 books, including Railroading Economics, Manufacturing Discontent, The Perverse Economy, and The Invention of Capitalism.

== Biography ==
A student of economics at the University of Michigan and San Francisco State College, Perelman earned a Ph.D in agricultural economics from the University of California, Berkeley in 1971, under supervision of George Kuznets. Perelman wrote that he was drawn away from the "framework of conventional economics," noticing that the agricultural system was "consuming ten times more energy than it was producing in the form of edible food." Perelman's research into how a "profit-oriented agricultural system created hunger, pollution, serious public health consequences, and environmental disruption, while throwing millions of people off the land" led to his first book, Farming for Profit in a Hungry World (1977). Perelman continued to write extensively in criticism of conventional or mainstream economics, including in all his books (and especially his books published from 2000 to date), papers and interviews.

Although perceiving flaws in Marx's work as it is typically interpreted in the context of its modern reading, Perelman wrote that "Marx’s crisis theory was far more sophisticated than many modern readers had realized," focusing on an interpretation that is largely bypassed by many readers of Marxian economic thought. Perelman viewed Marxist theory as vindicated through its account of crises that a capitalist economy must inherently generate.

Perelman appeared on a number of programs, including Media Matters, Pacifica Radio, KPFA 94.1 Berkeley, and WBBR (Bloomberg Radio).

== Books ==
- Farming for Profit in a Hungry World (1977)
- Classical Political Economy, Primitive Accumulation and the Social Division of Labor (1983)
- Karl Marx’s Crises Theories: Labor, Scarcity and Fictitious Capital (1987)
- Keynes, Investment Theory and the Economic Slowdown: The Role of Replacement Investment and q-Ratios (1989)
- Information, Social Relations, and the Economics of High Technology (1991)
- The Pathology of the U.S. Economy: The Costs of a Low Wage System (1993)
- The End of Economics (1996)
- Class Warfare in the Information Age (1998)
- The Natural Instability of Markets: Expectations, Increasing Returns and the Collapse of Markets (1999)
- Transcending the Economy: On the Potential of Passionate Labor and the Wastes of the Market (2000)
- The Invention of Capitalism: The Secret History of Primitive Accumulation (2000)
- The Pathology of the U.S. Economy Revisited: The Intractable Contradictions of Economic Policy (2001)
- Steal This Idea: Intellectual Property and The Corporate Confiscation of Creativity (2002)
- The Perverse Economy: The Impact of Markets on People and Nature (2003)
- Manufacturing Discontent: The Trap of Individualism in a Corporate Society (2005)
- Railroading Economics: The Creation of the Free Market Mythology (2006)
- The Confiscation of American Prosperity: From Right-Wing Extremism and Economic Ideology to the Next Great Depression (2007)
- The Invisible Handcuffs of Capitalism: How Market Tyranny Stifles the Economy by Stunting Workers (2011)
