= G-prior =

Type of probability distribution used in statistics

In statistics, the g-prior is an objective prior for the regression coefficients of a multiple regression. It was introduced by Arnold Zellner. It is a key tool in Bayes and empirical Bayes variable selection.

== Definition ==
Consider a data set $(x_1,y_1),\ldots,(x_n,y_n)$, where the $x_i$ are Euclidean vectors and the $y_i$ are scalars. The multiple regression model is formulated as

$$y_i = x_i^\top\beta + \varepsilon_i.$$

where the $\varepsilon_i$ are random errors. Zellner's g-prior for $\beta$ is a multivariate normal distribution with covariance matrix proportional to the inverse Fisher information matrix for $\beta$, similar to a Jeffreys prior.

Assume the $\varepsilon_i$ are i.i.d. normal with zero mean and variance $\psi^{-1}$. Let $X$ be the matrix with $i$th row equal to $x_i^\top$. Then the g-prior for $\beta$ is the multivariate normal distribution with prior mean a hyperparameter $\beta_0$ and covariance matrix proportional to $\psi^{-1}(X^\top X)^{-1}$, i.e.,

$$\beta |\psi  \sim \text{N}[\beta_0,g\psi^{-1} (X^\top X)^{-1}].$$

where g is a positive scalar parameter.

== Posterior distribution of beta ==
The posterior distribution of $\beta$ is given as

$$\beta |\psi,x,y  \sim \text{N}\Big[q\hat\beta+(1-q)\beta_0,\frac q\psi(X^\top X)^{-1}\Big].$$

where $q=g/(1+g)$ and

$$\hat\beta = (X^\top X)^{-1}X^\top y.$$

is the maximum likelihood (least squares) estimator of $\beta$. The vector of regression coefficients $\beta$ can be estimated by its posterior mean under the g-prior, i.e., as the weighted average of the maximum likelihood estimator and $\beta_0$,

$$\tilde\beta = q\hat\beta+(1-q)\beta_0.$$

Clearly, as g →∞, the posterior mean converges to the maximum likelihood estimator.

== Selection of g ==
Estimation of g is slightly less straightforward than estimation of $\beta$. A variety of methods have been proposed, including Bayes and empirical Bayes estimators.
