= Laurence Wolsey =

British mathematician (born 1945)

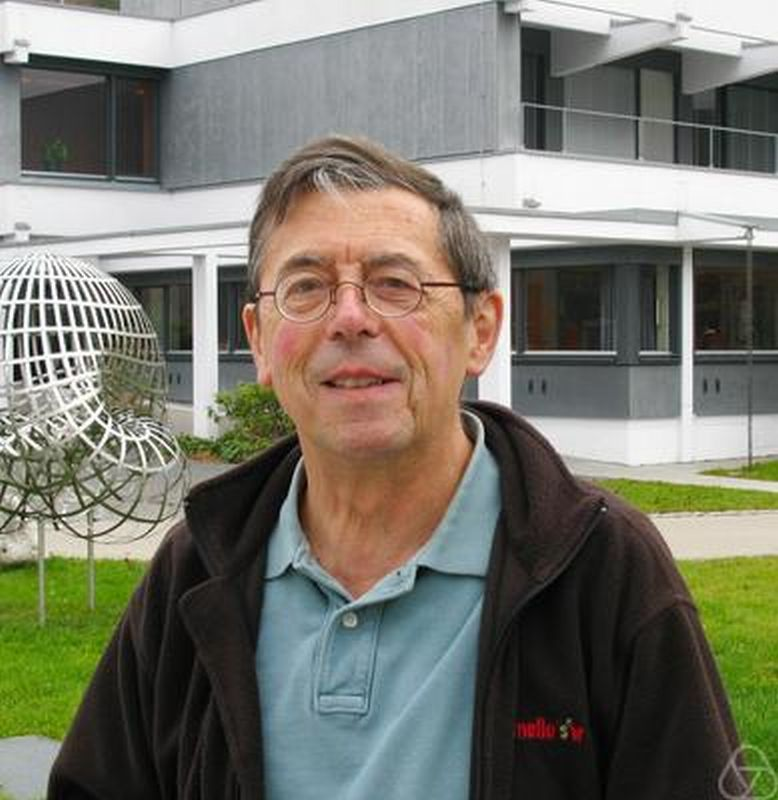
- Born: 14 May 1945

Laurence Alexander Wolsey is a Belgian-English mathematician working in the field of integer programming. His mother Anna Wolsey-Mautner was the daughter of the Viennese Industrialist Konrad David Mautner. He is a former president and research director of the Center for Operations Research and Econometrics (CORE) at Université catholique de Louvain in Belgium. He is professor emeritus of applied mathematics at the engineering school of the same university.

== Early life and education ==
Wolsey received a MSc in mathematics from Cambridge in 1966 and a Ph.D. in mathematics from the Massachusetts Institute of Technology in 1969 under the supervision of Jeremy F. Shapiro.

== Career ==
Wolsey was visiting researcher at the Manchester Business School in 1969–1971.

He was invited by George L. Nemhauser as a Post-Doctoral student to CORE in Belgium in 1971. He met his future wife, Marguerite Loute, sister of CORE colleague Etienne Loute, and settled in Belgium. He was later a visiting professor at the London School of Economics in 1978–1979, at Cornell University in 1983, at Ecole polytechnique de Lausanne in 1986–1987, and Donders professor at University of Utrecht in 1998.

Wolsey was the editor-in-chief of the Mathematical Programming journal from 1999 to 2003.

== Research ==
Wolsey has made seminal contributions in duality theory for integer programming, submodular optimization, the group-theoretic approach and polyhedral analysis of fixed-charge network flow and production planning models.

== Awards and honours ==
Wolsey has received the Beale-Orchard Hays Prize in 1988, the Frederick W. Lanchester Prize in 1989, the EURO Gold Medal in 1994, the John von Neumann Theory Prize in 2012, and the Dantzig Prize in 2012.

The ORBEL Wolsey award is a Belgian prize recognizing the best and most significant OR implementation contributed to Open-Source during the year.

== Selected publications ==
- Integer and Combinatorial Optimization (with George L. Nemhauser, Wiley, 1988)
- Integer Programming (Wiley, 1998)
- Wolsey, Laurence A. (1981). "Integer programming duality: Price functions and sensitivity analysis". Mathematical Programming A. 20: 173–195. doi:10.1007/BF01589344. S2CID 206800560.
- Nemhauser, G. L.; L. A. Wolsey; M. L. Fisher (1978). "An analysis of approximations for maximizing submodular set functions I". Mathematical Programming A. 14: 265–294. doi:10.1007/BF01588971. S2CID 206800425.
- Wolsey, Laurence A. (1971). "Extensions of the Group Theoretic Approach in Integer Programming". Management Science. 18: 1 74–183. doi:10.1287/mnsc.18.1.74.
- Van Roy, T. J.; Laurence A. Wolsey (1987). "Solving mixed integer programming problems using automatic reformulation". Operations Research. 35: 45–57. doi:10.1287/opre.35.1.45.
- Yves Pochet; Laurence A. Wolsey (2006). Production Planning by Mixed Integer Programming. Springer. ISBN 978-1441921321.
