= Center for Operations Research and Econometrics =

Belgian research university

CORE
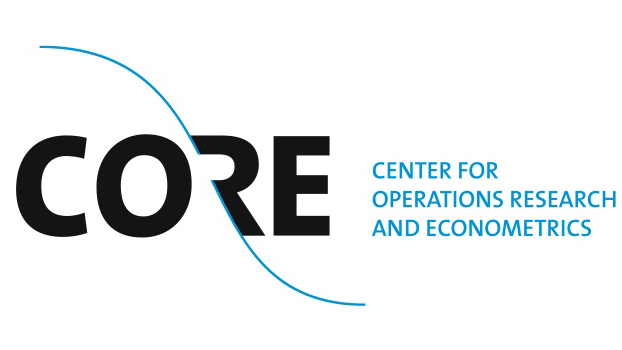
- Other names: Center for Operations Research and Econometrics
- Type: Research center
- Established: 1966
- Founders: Jacques Drèze
- Affiliations: UCLouvain
- President: Daniele Catanzaro
- Director: Francesca Monti
- Academic staff: 22
- Administrative staff: 8
- Doctoral students: 33
- Location: Louvain-la-Neuve, Belgium
- Campus: Louvain-la-Neuve
- Language: English
- Website: https://www.uclouvain.be/en/research-institutes/lidam/core

The Center for Operations Research and Econometrics (CORE) is an interdisciplinary research institute of the University of Louvain (UCLouvain) located in Louvain-la-Neuve, Belgium. Since 2010, it has been part of the Louvain Institute of Data Analysis and Modeling in economics and statistics (LIDAM), along with the Institute for Economic and Social Research (IRES), Louvain Finance (LFIN) and the Institute of Statistics, Biostatistics and Actuarial Sciences (ISBA).

CORE integrates fundamental and applied research in the following key fields: economics and game theory, econometrics, quantitative and economic geography, and operations research. Researchers at CORE aim at developing a theoretical and methodological base for the analysis of decision problems related to economic policy and the management of the public and private sector, the theory of optimisation and statistics for the solution of design and decision problems, and computational tools (algorithms and software).

== History and international recognition ==
CORE was founded in Leuven in 1966 at the initiative of Jacques Drèze, who is considered its founding father, Anton Barten and Guy de Ghellinck. Initially, the center existed within the Catholic University of Leuven. Following its split in 1968 to form the Dutch-speaking Katholieke Universiteit Leuven and the French-speaking Université catholique de Louvain, CORE moved to Louvain-la-Neuve in 1977 to join the latter.

CORE, the creation of which was inspired by the Cowles Foundation as well as the other institutions that Jacques Drèze had visited during his research work in the United States, brought economic modelling to Europe. Being a pioneer in the domain, CORE propelled Belgian and European economic research, which was very "local" at that time, into development. The center modernized it through the economic knowledge and research practices imported from the United States and contributed to its internationalization, while at the same time creating a local economic culture in Europe, e.g., through disequilibrium economics, which can be considered a French ‘trademark’ in macroeconomics. Another element of the continental economic culture was the development of specific research forms, such as research teams, co-authorship and peer review.

In 1966, CORE opened its doors with four academic members and three researchers on the staff. For comparison, today the center hosts 22 faculty members including emeritus professors, as well as 33 doctoral students and postdoctoral researchers.

In 1967, CORE received a five-year grant from the Ford Foundation, which propelled the center into rapid development by attracting faculty members and visitors. These researchers, including Gérard Debreu, Truman Bewley, Hildegard Dierker, Birgit Grodal, David Schmeidler, Karl Vind and Werner Hildenbrand, gained CORE international recognition in the field of mathematical economics. The time of the Ford grant coincided with the epoch of "Neo-Walrasian" economics at CORE, which also started the differentiation of disciplines. While initially the research fields were integrated, at that time there appeared the complementary but independent disciplines of mathematical economics, operations research and econometrics. After the division of the disciplines, disequilibrium economics became the major and most influential research area at CORE, differentiating the center from US practices and establishing it as a specific school in macroeconomics.

By 1973, when the Ford grant ended, CORE had expanded its permanent faculty to 21 members with about as many visitors. The maintenance of the center was taken over by the university, supported by external funding through various research contracts with the Belgian government and different organizations. With the disciplines becoming more and more differentiated, mathematical programming and econometrics, initially minor fields, also developed and became important research areas at CORE. Thus, Bayesian econometrics can be considered a trademark of the center, sometimes referred to as the "Belgian Bayesian School".

In 1977, CORE expanded into training activities by the creation of the European Doctoral Program in Quantitative Economics, later joined by other partners. In 1985, the European Economic Association was created at the initiative of Jacques Drèze (who became its first president), Jean Gabszewicz, Louis Phlips, Jacques-François Thisse, and Jean Waelbroeck.

Today, CORE's major research fields include economics, game theory, operations research, quantitative and economic geography. Its main objectives are fostering quality research, developing networking connections for scientific exchange and collaboration, training young doctoral and postdoctoral researchers, as well as making professionals in the public and private sector benefit from scientific knowledge.

== People ==
The permanent academic staff of CORE is constituted of 22 faculty members coming from UCLouvain and its partner institutions, supported by several administrative employees.

Yearly, the center hosts an average of 25 researchers coming to CORE on long-term visits, including two categories of external visitors: associate fellows and research associates working at CORE on a weekly and yearly basis respectively. They are appointed for two years subject to the support of two CORE members, with the possibility to extend this period. Associate fellows and research associates are expected to participate in all CORE activities including scientific projects, seminars and publications. Yearly, several research fellows receive CORE fellowships, which are postdoctoral grants distributed on a competitive basis for a period of time from one to three years. In the framework of its Ph.D. and postdoctoral training programs, the center hosts 33 doctoral and postdoctoral researchers per year. In addition to the longer stays, CORE regularly receives faculty and researchers coming on short visits from a few days to a few weeks.

With its members and visitors coming from institutions all over the world, CORE is characterised by an international working environment and attributes particular importance to research networking connections.

== Governance ==
The following lists detail the chronological succession of CORE's Presidents and Research Directors since its foundation in 1966, based on the institutional archives.

=== Presidents ===
- Henri Florin (1966–1967)
- Frans Van Winckel (1968–1969)
- Jacques Drèze (1970–1983)
- Jean Gabszewicz (1983–1992)
- Laurence Wolsey (1992–1998)
- Heracles Polemarchakis (1998–2000)
- Jacques Thisse (2000–2006)
- Claude d'Aspremont (2006–2010)
- Luc Bauwens (2010–2013)
- Philippe Chevalier (2013–2019)
- Mathieu Van Vyve (2019–2022)
- Daniele Catanzaro (2022–present)

=== Research Directors ===
- Jacques Drèze (1966–1970)
- Anton Barten (1967–1975)
- Guy de Ghellinck (1974–1975)
- George Nemhauser (1975–1977)
- Jean Gabszewicz (1977–1980)
- Laurence Wolsey (1980–81, 1988–1991)
- Paul Champsaur (1981–1983)
- Jean-François Richard (1983–1986)
- Bernard Cornet (1986–1988)
- Heracles Polemarchakis (1991–1995)
- Claude d'Aspremont (1995–1998)
- Michel Le Breton (1998–2000)
- Yves Pochet (2000–2004)
- Rabah Amir (2003–2004)
- Shlomo Weber (2004–2006)
- Luc Bauwens (2006–2009)
- Erik Schokkaert (2009–2011)
- François Maniquet (2011–2014, 2019–2021)
- Maurice Queyranne (2014–2016)
- Isabelle Thomas (2016–2019)
- Sébastien Van Bellegem (2021–2026)
- Francesca Monti (2026–present)

== Research ==
CORE's major research areas are: Economics and Game theory, Econometrics, Operations Research and Quantitative and Economic Geography.

=== Economics and game theory ===
Among the major research areas developed at CORE are traditionally general equilibrium (uncertainty, incomplete markets, computation of equilibrium, non-convexities in the production sector, introduction of money, price equilibria, unemployment study), industrial economics, political economics, spatial economics, public economics, environmental economics, decision theory, macroeconomics as well as non-cooperative and cooperative game theory (equilibrium concepts, uncertainty, cooperative solutions). The current research in this area comprises theoretical, applied and empirical developments. It aims at providing a theoretical basis for the solution of market regulation and public sector organisation problems. The current research areas include industrial organization, public economics and political economy, environmental economics, welfare economics and social choice theory, general equilibrium and various game-theoretical topics.

=== Econometrics ===
Econometrics research at CORE is aimed at the development of quantitative models as well as statistical and computational methods applied to treating economic data. Among the major CORE contributions in econometrics are Bayesian estimation of simultaneous equations systems (Bayesian inference methods are widely used in research at CORE) and the concepts of weak and strong exogeneity used in statistical inference. Other important research fields include financial econometrics and structural econometrics. The current research areas in econometrics are financial econometrics, time series econometrics and Bayesian methods.

=== Operations research ===
Research in this field is related to optimization and mathematical programming. Among the major contribution areas are discrete optimization, integer programming and convex optimization. Research is also carried out in the fields of large energy investments, electricity transfers and markets and European market design and regulation as well as in supply chain management. Operations research is closely connected with economic geography through the use of mathematical programming methods in solving location decision problems. The current operations research areas include modelling and finding solutions to industrial economics problems, discrete optimization, linear and nonlinear optimization, and the calculation of equilibria.

=== Quantitative and economic geography ===
Research in geography at CORE is closely connected with economics, e.g. the joint study of the location of human activities and their environmental footprint. It is focused on the areas of quantitative and economic geography and finds its applications in land-use planning policy. The current research areas in geography include location-allocation models, transport geography and sustainable mobility, spatial quantitative analyses, human and economic geography.

== Chairs and scientific projects ==
Around 30 scientific projects are developed yearly at CORE, financed in the form of grants and contracts by the public and private sector, including the Belgian Federal Government, e.g., the Belgian Federal Science Policy Office, the Fund for Scientific Research – FNRS, the Belgian French Community, the European Commission, e.g., the European Research Council, Framework Programmes, COST Actions, various Belgian and foreign public institutions, private enterprises, etc.

At CORE, there are currently three research chairs:

- ENGIE Chair in Energy Economics and Energy Risk Management funded by Engie and supporting research in the field of risk management in energy markets.
- Kronos Group Chair in Strategic Sourcing and Procurement financed by Kronos Group, Belgium, and combining research, teaching and networking activities in strategic sourcing and procurement at the Louvain School of Management, both in the theoretical and practical domain.
- Chair in Digital Economics financed by Google, linked to the Digital Economics Research Network DERN, stimulating theory- and evidence-based research, meeting the highest standards of quality and objectivity, in the field of digital economics.

At CORE, previous chairs include

- Chair Lhoist Berghmans in Environmental Economics and Management comprising teaching and research targeting the cost-benefit analysis of the application of alternative technologies in industry and the evaluation of the impact of industrial activities on the environment and the standard of living, 2002-2011.
- GSK Vaccines Chair in Sourcing funded by GSK Vaccines as the first research chair in sourcing in Belgium, 2011-2016.
- Tractebel Chair in Energy Economics funded by Tractebel Engineering in energy system optimization and transmission system analysis.

== Doctoral training ==
CORE regularly hosts some 30 Ph.D. students carrying out research under the supervision of its members. On average, around seven doctoral dissertations are completed at CORE yearly with about 25 more in progress. The supervision is carried out in the framework of the doctoral programs of various UCLouvain departments related to the CORE research fields as well as of the following inter-institutional Ph.D. programs:

- The European Doctoral Program in Quantitative Economics (EDP) created in 1977 by CORE and organized jointly by the following institutions: Université catholique de Louvain (Belgium), École des Hautes Etudes en Sciences Sociales (France), Rheinische Friedrich-Wilhelms-Universität Bonn (Germany), European University Institute (Italy), Universitat Pompeu Fabra Barcelona (Spain), London School of Economics and Political Science (UK) and Tel Aviv University (Israel) as an exchange partner. The program covers the fields of econometrics, economics and game theory. It was ranked third among European Ph.D. programs in 2008.
- The European Doctorate in Economics Erasmus Mundus (EDEEM) federating the following institutions: Universität Bielefeld (Germany) as the coordinator, Universiteit van Amsterdam (the Netherlands), Universidade Nova de Lisboa (Portugal), Université catholique de Louvain (Belgium), Université Paris 1 Panthéon-Sorbonne (France), École des Hautes Etudes en Sciences Sociales (France), Università Ca'Foscari Venezia (Italy) as well as academic and non-academic partners. The program accepts students with various backgrounds though a strong interest and knowledge in economics and mathematics are highly desirable.

== Scientific events ==
Currently, eight seminars and reading groups are held at CORE on a regular basis including the three traditional weekly seminars in econometrics, economics and operations research and a seminar organized by ECORES, a joint association of CORE (UCLouvain), ECARES (Université libre de Bruxelles) and CES (Katholieke Universiteit Leuven).

Among the scientific events organized at CORE are also regular doctoral workshops where Ph.D. students can present their completed and ongoing research and lecture series hosting renowned scientists from Belgian and foreign academic institutions invited to the center to give lectures on topics related to its research areas.

CORE is a frequent organizer and co-organizer of various scientific events at the local and international level, held both at CORE and other institutions in Belgium and abroad: conferences, meetings, workshops, forums, schools, etc. CORE members regularly attend external seminars, conferences and meetings, most often to present a paper, and are invited to other institutions for academic stays and visits.

== Publications ==
CORE currently issues three scientific paper series:

- CORE Discussion Papers

The Discussion Paper Series includes the papers produced by all CORE members or visitors during their stay at CORE, open for discussion pending publication in scientific journals.

- CORE Reprints

The CORE Reprints comprise all published papers written by its members and visitors.

- CORE Lecture Series

This series was created in 1987 with the CORE Foundation, a privately financed international scientific association aiming to support research in econometrics, operations research and economics as well as scientific cooperation and training in these fields. The CORE Lecture Series is constituted of the presentations of renowned scientists invited to the center to give lectures in research areas related to CORE.

Apart from the CORE Discussion Paper and Reprint Series, CORE members and visitors contribute to the production of various external scientific papers including journal publications: mimeos, manuscripts, reviews, research papers, working and discussions papers, conference proceedings, lecture notes, guides, technical reports, etc. Likewise, several books and edited books as well as newspaper articles are published yearly by CORE researchers. CORE members and visitors are equally involved in various editorial activities working as editors-in-chief, members of the editorial board and of the scientific committee, editors, co-editors, invited editors, etc. of different scientific journals.

== Awards and honours ==
Among the scientific distinctions received by CORE members are: Lanchester Prize, Francqui Prize, Francqui Chair, European Research Council Advanced and Starting Grants, EURO Gold Medal, Honoris Causa Doctorate, Dantzig Prize, John von Neumann Theory Prize, European Prize in Regional Science, Robert C. Witt Award, De la Vega Prize, Walter Isard Award, Kulp-Wright Book award, Wernaers Prize, Social Choice and Welfare Prize, Emile de Laveleye Prize, William Alonso Memorial Prize, Ferdinand de Lesseps Prize, Risques–Les Echos Prize, SIAM Activity Group on Optimization Prize, etc., various thesis awards (Savage Award, Ernst Meyer Prize, Sogesci-BVWB Prize, Orbel Award, etc.) as well as (honorary) memberships and fellowships within different academic, research and other institutions.

== Some renowned researchers that contributed to the work of CORE ==
Among the renowned researchers having contributed to the work of CORE through visits, publications and participation in seminars and conferences are (the list being non-exhaustive):

- Kenneth Arrow
- Robert Aumann
- Claude d'Aspremont
- Gérard Debreu
- Marc Fleurbaey
- John Geanakoplos
- Victor Ginsburgh
- Michel Goemans
- Christian Gouriéroux
- Patrick Harker
- Werner Hildenbrand
- Matthew Jackson
- Thomas Magnanti
- François Maniquet
- Eric Maskin
- Franco Modigliani
- Roger Myerson
- George Nemhauser
- Arkadi Nemirovski
- Yurii Nesterov
- Ariel Rubinstein
- Thomas Sargent
- Reinhard Selten
- Lloyd Shapley
- Joseph Stiglitz
- Jacques-François Thisse
- Jean Tirole
- Laurence Wolsey
