= George Kuznets =

American economist

- Born: July 28, 1909; Kiev, Russian Empire
- Died: August 3, 1986 (aged 77); Berkeley, California
- Education: Stanford University
- Scientific career
- Fields: Economics
- Workplaces: University of California, Berkeley
- Thesis: The organization of psychoneurotic dispositions as measured by the psychological questionnaire (1941)
- Doctoral students: Michael Perelman; Arnold Zellner

George M. Kuznets (/ˈkʌznɛts/; July 28, 1909 – August 3, 1986) was an American economist. A member of the University of California, Berkeley's department of agricultural and resource economics, he specialized in agricultural economics. Regarded by his peers as a pioneer in quantitative research, Kuznets was appointed a fellow of the American Agricultural Economics Association in 1982, the highest honor of his profession. He was also elected as a Fellow of the American Statistical Association, in 1960.

Born in into a Jewish family in Kiev, Russian Empire (now in Ukraine), Kuznets moved to the US from Warsaw alone after the death of his mother in 1926 and obtained a Ph.D. in psychometrics from the University of California, Berkeley. His older brother Simon Kuznets was also an economist and won the 1971 Nobel Memorial Prize in Economic Sciences.
