= Arnold Zellner =

American economist and statistician

- Born: January 2, 1927; Brooklyn, New York, U.S.
- Died: August 11, 2010 (aged 83); Chicago, Illinois, U.S.
- Education: University of California, Berkeley; Harvard University
- Known for: Bayesian analysis g-prior Seemingly unrelated regressions
- Scientific career
- Fields: Statistics, Econometrics
- Workplaces: University of Chicago
- Doctoral advisor: George Kuznets
- Doctoral students: James B. Ramsey; Richard Roll; John H. Makin; Claude Montmarquette; Sanford J. Grossman; Franz Palm; Robert J. Hodrick; Charles Plosser; John M. Abowd; Jean-Marie Dufour; Robert I. Webb; Greg Allenby

Arnold Zellner (January 2, 1927 – August 11, 2010) was an American economist and statistician specializing in the fields of Bayesian probability and econometrics. Zellner contributed pioneering work in the field of Bayesian analysis and econometric modeling.

Zellner not only provided many applications of Bayesian analysis but also a new information-theoretic derivation of information processing rules that are 100% efficient — this class includes Bayes's theorem. In econometric modeling, he developed, in association with Franz Palm, the structural time-series approach for constructing new models and for checking the adequacy of old models. In addition, he was involved in many important applied econometric and statistical studies.

Born in Brooklyn, New York, to Ukrainian immigrant parents, Zellner earned his A.B. in physics from Harvard University in 1949 and his Ph.D. in economics from the University of California, Berkeley, under supervision of George Kuznets, in 1957. He held honorary degrees from the Autonomous University of Madrid in Spain, the Universidade Técnica de Lisboa in Portugal, the University of Kiel in Germany, and the Erasmus School of Economics at Erasmus University Rotterdam in the Netherlands.

He was H.G.B. Alexander Distinguished Service Professor Emeritus of Economics and Statistics at the Graduate School of Business of the University of Chicago. He was the founder of the International Society for Bayesian Analysis and also served as President of the American Statistical Association in 1991.

He died on August 11, 2010, in his home in Hyde Park, Chicago.

== Bibliography ==
- Arnold Zellner (1997). Bayesian Analysis in Econometrics and Statistics: The Zellner View and Papers. Edward Elgar. ISBN 978-1-85898-220-5.
- Arnold Zellner; Hugo A. Keuzenkamp; Michael McAleer (2002). Simplicity, Inference and Modelling: Keeping it Sophisticatedly Simple. Cambridge University Press. ISBN 978-1-139-43238-2.
- James A. Crutchfield; Arnold Zellner (2010) [2002]. The Economics of Marine Resources and Conservation Policy: The Pacific Halibut Case Study with Commentary. University of Chicago Press. ISBN 978-0-226-12197-0.
- Arnold Zellner; Justin Tobias (2001). "Further Results on Bayesian Method of Moments Analysis of the Multiple Regression Model" (PDF). International Economic Review. 42 (1): 121–140. doi:10.1111/1468-2354.00103. JSTOR 2648721.
