= Anton Barten =

Dutch economist (1930–2016)

- Born: 14 January 1930
- Died: 15 June 2016 (aged 86)

Academic background
- Education: Erasmus University Rotterdam
- Doctoral advisor: Henri Theil

Academic work
- Discipline: Econometrics

Anton Peter Barten (14 January 1930 – 15 June 2016) was a Dutch economist.

Barten was born in Amsterdam. He studied economics at the University of Amsterdam and obtained his PhD at the Erasmus University Rotterdam. He worked at the Econometric Institute at the same university in the late 1950s. He there developed in interest in consumer demand. In 1966 Barten started working at the Center for Operations Research and Econometrics in Leuven, Belgium, which had been set up by Jacques Drèze.

In the late 1980s Barten was involved in setting up the Center for Economic Research at Tilburg University (centER) in the Netherlands. He became the first director of the center. Barten later returned to Leuven, to take up a position at the Katholieke Universiteit Leuven. In 2008 Barten was awarded the Tjalling Koopmans medal by Tilburg University for his role in the foundation of centER.

Barten became a corresponding member of the Royal Netherlands Academy of Arts and Sciences in 1984. He became member of the Academia Europaea in 1990. He was a Fellow of the Econometric Society. Barten died in Leuven.
