= Jacques-François Thisse =

Belgian economic geographer

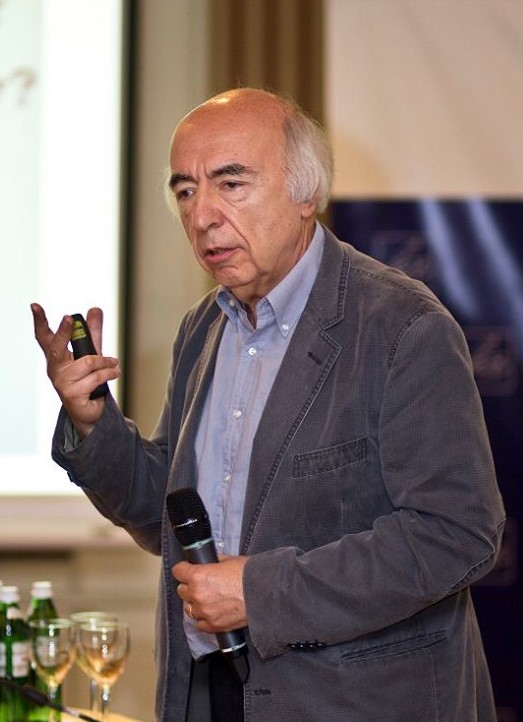
- Jacques-François Thisse in 2013
- Born: April 21, 1946 (age 80); Jemeppe-sur-Meuse, Belgium
- Known for: His work on imperfect competition theory, spatial economics, location theory, and international trade.

Academic work
- Discipline: Economics, regional science, geography
- Sub-discipline: Spatial economics, location theory, industrial economics, international trade
- Institutions: CORE, Université catholique de Louvain (Belgium)
- Doctoral students: Martine Labbé, Gianmarco Ottaviano

Jacques-François Thisse is a Belgian economist, author, and academic. Thisse is Professor Emeritus of Economics and Regional Science at the Catholic University of Louvain and at the École des Ponts ParisTech. Thisse's work is related to location theory and its applications to various economic fields in which the heterogeneity of agents matters. This includes industrial organisation, urban and spatial economics, local public finance, international trade, and voting. He has published more than 200 papers in scientific journals, including Econometrica, American Economic Review, Review of Economic Studies, Journal of Political Economy, and Operations Research.

== Biography ==
Thisse got a Licence in Mathematics with distinction in 1968, a Licence in Economics with the highest distinction in 1972, and a Doctorate in Economics with the highest distinction in 1975, all from the University of Liège (Belgium). Thisse's interest in urban studies dates back to the early 1970s when only a few scholars, mainly geographers, were interested in the subject. In a 2020 interview to the European Regional Science Association (ERSA), Thisse said that the main question that had sparked his interest was "What could be the economic justification for the existence of cities? Why do have cities?".

Thisse worked for the Université catholique de Louvain first as a lecturer in regional science (1975-1983) and then as a professor of economics (1983–1992). In 1991, Thisse became a full professor at Paris-I Sorbonne and stayed until 1996. He then returned to Louvain, where he became full professor until 2010. He has been visiting professor at McMaster University, Virginia Tech, ENSAE, Kyoto University, and Columbia University.

Thisse was programme chairman of the European Meeting of the Econometric Society in 1992 and president of the Scientific Council of the Economists of La Société des Grands Projets (formerly La Société du Grand Paris) from 2012 to 2016. He was director of CERAS, Ecole Nationale des Ponts et Chaussées (Paris) from 1992 to 1996 and president of the Center for Operations Research and Econometrics, UCLouvain, from 2000 to 2006. He has also obtained several research grants from the Belgian Science Foundation.

== Research ==
Thisse was among the first to analyse oligopolistic markets when firms supply products having different qualities (vertical product differentiation) in the late 1970s. He was at the origin of several decisive advances in product differentiation theory, in particular the study of firms’ behavior when consumers' choices for goods is described by choice probabilities (logit model) and of firms’ product positioning in multi-dimensional characteristics spaces. Thisse's research in industrial organization was synthesized and extended in Discrete Choice Theory of Product Differentiation, a book co-authored with Simon P. Anderson and André de Palma and published by MIT Press in 1992. The book shows how models of product differentiation may be integrated within the framework of discrete choice theory and provides theoretical foundations for the different modelling strategies used in this domain. After more than 30 years, Discrete Choice Theory of Product Differentiation remains a classical reference.

Thisse was one of the precursors of spatial economics through his analysis of the agglomeration of firms in location theory, as illustrated by his papers published in Econometrica in 1979 and 1985. He also worked in new economic geography with G.I.P. Ottaviano and Takatoshi Tabuchi with whom he published several papers. In “Agglomeration and trade revisited,” they developed the first analytically solvable core-periphery model.

Thisse is also known for his contributions to the role of increasing returns to scale in production, and commuting costs and amenities in urban economics. His work explores how cities organize themselves based on the interactions between these economic factors, with a special emphasis on environment, metropolitan areas, and market integration. Thisse's research often involves quantitative spatial models and stylized geographies, aiming to provide a comprehensive analytical characterization of urban equilibrium and stability across various parameter spaces.

His 2002 book, Economics of Agglomeration, co-written in collaboration with Masahisa Fujita, was devoted to the formation of different types of agglomerations. Nobel Laureate Paul Krugman commented on the book saying it is “better than any book so far, this volume integrates concepts that range from ‘edge cities’ to global divergence into a single grand view.”

== Honors, awards, and fellowships ==
=== Honors ===
- Honorary Doctorate from the University of Montréal (2005)
- Honorary Doctorate from Paris-Panthéon-Assas University (2010)
- Honorary Doctorate from the Jean Monnet University (2011)
- The Francqui Chair by the Francqui Foundation (1999-2000)

=== Awards and prizes ===
- E. Kempe Prize in memory of T. Palander, Umea, 1986
- William Alonso Memorial Prize for Innovative Work in Regional Science, Seattle, 2004
- Prix Scientifique Quinquennal Ernest-John Solvay, Fonds National de la Recherche Scientifique, Brussels, 2005
- European Prize in Regional Science, Paris, 2007
- Walter Isard Award for Scholarly Achievement in 2010
- Research.com Economics and Finance in Belgium Leader Award, 2022
- Research.com Economics and Finance in Belgium Leader Award, 2023
- Research.com Economics and Finance in Belgium Leader Award, 2024
- Founder's Medal of the Regional Science Association International, 2024

=== Fellowships ===
Thisse is a Fellow of the Centre for Economic Policy Research (since 1992). He was elected a Fellow of the Econometric Society in 1992, a Fellow of the Regional Science Association International in 2003, and a Fellow of the Society for the Advancement of Economic Theory in 2019.

== Selected publications ==
=== Books ===
==== In English ====
- Koster, Hans, Stef Proost and Jacques-François Thisse. Spatial Economics. Oxford University Press, 2026.
- Fujita, Masahisa and Jacques-François Thisse. Economics of Agglomeration: Cities, Industrial Location, and Globalization. 2nd ed. Cambridge: Cambridge University Press, 2013.
- Prager, Jean-Claude and Jacques-François Thisse. Economic Geography and the Unequal Development of Regions. London: Routledge, 2012.
- Combes, Pierre-Philippe, Thierry Mayer, and Jacques-François Thisse. Economic geography: The integration of regions and nations. Princeton University Press, 2009. doi:10.1515/9781400842940
- Fujita, Masahisa and Jacques-François Thisse. Economics of Agglomeration: Cities, Industrial Location, and Regional Growth. Cambridge: Cambridge University Press, 2002.
- Anderson, Simon P., André de Palma, and Jacques-François Thisse. Discrete choice theory of product differentiation. MIT press, 1992. ISBN 9780262011280

==== In French ====
- Economie géographique du développement. Paris, Collection Repères, 2010 (with J.C. Prager).
- Analyse mathématique pour l'économie. Topologie. Paris, Dalloz, 1976 (with L. A. Gérard-Varet and M. Prévot).

=== Edited books ===
- Handbook of Regional and Urban Economics. Volume IV. Amsterdam, North-Holland, 2004. Co-edited with J.V. Henderson.
- Market Structure and Competition Policy: Game-theoretic Perspectives. Cambridge, Cambridge University Press, 2000. Co-edited with G. Norman.
- Economics of Cities: Theoretical Perspectives. Cambridge, Cambridge University Press, 2000. Co-edited with J.-M. Huriot.
- Microeconomic Theories of Imperfect Competition. Cheltenham, Edward Elgar, Classics in Economics, 1999. Co-edited with J. Gabszewicz.
- Location Theory. Gloucester, Cheltenham, Edward Elgar, Modern Classics in Regional Science, 1996.
- The Economics of Product Differentiation. Gloucester, Edward Elgar, Classics in Economics, 1994. Co-edited with G. Norman.
- Does Economic Space Matter? London, Macmillan, 1993. Co-edited with H. Ohta.
- Facility Location Analysis: Theory and Applications. Basel, Baltzer, 1989. Co-edited with L. Louveaux and M. Labbé.
- Locational Analysis of Public Facilities. Amsterdam, North-Holland, 1983. Co-edited with H.G. Zoller.

=== Journal articles ===
- Thisse, Jacques-François, Matthew Turner, and Philip Ushchev. A unified theory of cities. No. w29078. National Bureau of Economic Research, 2021. doi:10.3386/w29078
- Parenti, Mathieu, Philip Ushchev, and Jacques-François Thisse. “Toward a theory of monopolistic competition,” Journal of Economic Theory, 167 (2017), 86–115. doi:10.3982/ECTA9986
- Zhelobodko, Evgeny, Sergey Kokovin, Mathieu Parenti, and Jacques‐François Thisse. “Monopolistic competition: Beyond the constant elasticity of substitution.” Econometrica, 80 (2012), 2765-2784.
- Ottaviano, Gianmarco, Takatoshi Tabuchi, and Jacques-François Thisse. “Agglomeration and trade revisited.” International Economic Review, 43 (2002), 409-435.
- Brueckner, Jan K., Jacques-François Thisse, and Yves Zenou. "Why is Central Paris rich and Downtown Detroit poor?” An amenity-based theory." European Economic Review, 43 (1999), 91-107.
- Irmen, Andreas. and Jacques-François Thisse. “Competition in multi-characteristics spaces: Hotelling was almost right.” Journal of Economic Theory, 78 (1998), 76-102.
- O'Donoghue, Ted, Suzanne Scotchmer, and Jacques‐François Thisse. “Patent breadth, patent life, and the pace of technological progress.” Journal of Economics & Management Strategy, 7 (1998), 1-32. doi:10.1111/j.1430-9134.1998.00001.x
- Thisse, Jacques-François, and Xavier Vives. “On the strategic choice of spatial price policy.” American Economic Review, 78 (1988), 122-137.
- de Palma, André, Victor Ginsburgh, Yorgo Y. Papageorgiou, and Jacques-François Thisse. “The principle of minimum differentiation holds under sufficient heterogeneity.” Econometrica, 53 (1985), 767-781. doi:10.2307/1912653
- Gabszewicz, J. Jaskold, and Jacques-François Thisse. “Price competition, quality and income disparities.” Journal of Economic Theory, 20 (1979): 340-359. doi:10.1016/B978-0-12-476750-8.50015-4
- d’Aspremont, Claude, J. Jaskold Gabszewicz, and Jacques-Francois Thisse. “On Hotelling's Stability in competition.” Econometrica, 47 (1979): 1145-1150. doi:10.2307/1911955
