= Motty Perry =

Israeli economist (born 1949)

- מוטי פרי
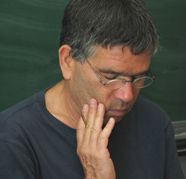
- Born: October 2, 1949 (age 76); Yad Mordechai, Israel

Motty Perry (Hebrew: מוטי פרי; born October 2, 1949) is an Israeli professor of economics at the University of Warwick, England, and the emeritus Don Patinkin Professor of Economics at the Hebrew University of Jerusalem.

== Biography ==
Motty Perry was born on Kibbutz Yad Mordechai. He has a B.A. in Economics from Bar Ilan University, an MA in Economics from the Hebrew University of Jerusalem and a Ph.D. in Economics from Princeton University. In 2005–2008, Motty Perry was associate editor of the Journal of Games and Economics Behavior and of the Journal of Economic Theory. In 2000, he became a fellow of the Econometric Society and, in 2008, he became a council member of the Game Theory Society.

== Political activism ==
Following Anwar Sadat's visit to Israel in 1978, Perry was one of the leaders of the 348 Israeli military reserve officers petition urging Israeli Prime Minister Menachem Begin to continue with the 'drive for peace'. This petition led to the creation of Peace Now, an organization dedicated to raising public support for the peace process. Perry has opposed Israeli settlements in the West Bank, which he perceives as immoral and an obstacle to the possibility of peace with the Palestinians. Motty Perry was also among the Air Force reserve pilots who caused controversy on Rosh Hashanah in 2003 with their declaration that they would refuse to participate in "targeted killings". The Pilots’ Letter, which was sent to the commander of the Air Force, generated media awareness in Israel and the world. In 2005, Perry was also one of the organizers of an open letter from faculty members of Israeli universities, supporting students who refused to serve as soldiers in the occupied territories. From 2011 to 2014, he served as a board member of B'Tselem.

== Publications ==
- "Optimal Linear Taxation with Partial Information," 1980. Economics Letters, 15, 257–263.
- "Non-Linear Price Strategies in a Contestable Market,” 1984. Journal of Economic Theory, Vol. 32, No. 2, 246–264.
- "Wage Bargaining, Labor Turnover, and the Business Cycle,” 1985 with G. Solon. Journal of Labor, Vol. 3, No. 4, 421–433.
- "An Example of Price Formation in a Bilateral Situation,” 1986. Econometrica, Vol. 54, No. 2, 312–322.
- "Search in a Known Pattern,” 1986 with A. Wigderson. Journal of Political Economy, Vol. 94, No.1, 225–230.
- "Sequential Bargaining under Asymmetric Information,” 1986 with S. Grossman. Journal of Economic Theory, Vol. 39, No.1, 97–119.
- "Perfect Sequential Equilibrium,” 1986 with S. Grossman. Journal of Economic Theory, Vol. 39, No.1, 120–154.
- "Strategic Delay in Bargaining,” 1987 with A. Admati. Review of Economic Studies, Vol. 54, 345–363.
- "Strategic Delay in Bargaining,” 1992 with A. Admati. In Linhart Radner and Satterthwaite (eds.) Bargaining with Incomplete Info, Academic Press, 321–40.
- "Joint Project without Commitment,” 1991 with A. Admati. Review of Economic Studies, Vol. 58, 259–276.
- "Non Cooperative Bargaining Without Procedures,” 1993 with P. Reny. Journal of Economic Theory, Vol. 59 No. 1, 50–77.
- "Open Vs. Closed Door Negotiation,” 1994 with L. Samuelson. The RAND Journal of Economics, Vol. 25, No.2, 348–359.
- "A Noncooperative View of Coalition Formation and the Core,” 1994 with P. Reny. Econometrica, Vol. 62, No.4, 795–818.
- "A Noncooperative View of Coalition Formation and the Core,” 1997 with P. Reny. In E. Maskin (ed), Recent Developments in Game Theory.
- "Virtual Implementation in Backward Induction,” 1996 with J. Glazer. Games and Economic Behavior, Vol. 15, No.1, 27–32.
- "A General Solution to King Solomon Dilemma,” 1999 with P. Reny. Games and Economic Behavior, Vol. 26, No. 2, 279–285.
- "The Absent-Minded Driver,” 1997 with R. J. Aumann, and S. Hart. Games and Economic Behavior, Vol. 20, No. 1, 102–116.
- "The Forgetful Passenger,” 1997 with R. J. Aumann, and S. Hart. Games and Economic Behavior, Vol. 20, No. 1, 117–120.
- "On the Failure of the Linkage Principle,” 1999 with P. Reny Econometrica, Vol. 67, No.4, 895–90.
- "A Sealed Bid Auction that Matches the English Auction," 2000 with E. wolfstetter and S. Zamir. Games and Economic Behavior, Vol. 33, No. 2, 265–273.
- "Dynamic Consistency and Optimal Patent Allocation,” 2002 with D. Vincent. International Economic Review.
- "An Efficient Auction,” 2002 with Phil Reny. Econometrica, Vol. 70, No. 3 – May, 2002, 1199–1212.
- "An Ex-Post Efficient Ascending Auction,” 2005 with P. Reny. The Review of Economic Studies, 72, 567–592.
- "Toward a Strategic Foundation for Rational Expectations Equilibrium," 2006 with P. Reny. Econometrica, Vol. 74, 1231–1269.
- "Tournaments with Midterm Reviews" 2009 with A. Gershkov, Games and Economic Behavior, Vol.66, 162–190 .
- "Dynamic Contacts with Moral Hazard and Adverse Selection" 2012 with A. Gershkov, The Review of Economic Studies, Vol 79(1), 268–306.
- "Implementing the Wisdom of the Crowds” 2014 with Ilan Kremer and Yishay Mansour, Journal of Political Economy, Vol. 122(5), 988–1012.
- "How to Count Citations if You Must" 2016 with Phil Reny, American Economic Review.
- "An evolutionary theory of monogamy" 2016 with Francesconi M, and Ghiglino C, Journal of Economic Theory 166: 605-628.
- "Evidence games : truth and commitment" 2017 with S. Hart and I kremer, American Economic Review 107(3):690-713
- "Why Sex and Why in Pairs" 2017 with P. Reny and A. Robson, Economic Journal, 127(607):2730-2743 .
- "How to Count Citations if You Must" 2016 with Phil Reny, American Economic Review,106(9):2722-2741.
- ״The wisdom of the crowd when acquiring information is costly." 2021 with Jacob Glazer and I, Kremer, Management Science 67(10), 6443-6456.
- "Fake reviews" 2021 with Glazer J, and H. Herrera, Economic Journal 131(636):1772-1787
