= Jean-François Richard =

Belgian-American economist (born 1943)

Jean-François Richard (born 1943 in Belgium) is a Belgian-American economist, who is currently the distinguished university professor of Economics at the University of Pittsburgh. He has taught and done research at five major universities, primarily in the field of econometrics. His interests are auctions, computational methods, collusions, Bayesian methods and econometric modeling. He has been extensively involved as author, editor, and advisor with scholarly publications in econometrics and related fields.

== Education ==
He earned his License in Physics in 1965, his License in Economics in 1968, and his Ph.D. in 1973, all from the University of Louvain.

== Career ==
Richard is a distinguished university professor of economics at the University of Pittsburgh. He also holds an appointment in the department of statistics. Prior to coming to Pittsburgh in 1991, he held teaching and research positions at the University of Louvain, University of Chicago, London School of Economics, University of London, and Duke University.

His research interests include econometric modeling, time series, Bayesian methods, and empirical game theoretic models of auctions and collusion. He is also interested in computational methods relying upon Monte Carlo simulations.

At the University of Pittsburgh, Richard has taught multiple courses in the Economics Department. He has taught general and advanced courses in Econometrics and an introductory course on properly applying mathematical models to the social sciences.

== Honors ==
- Prix des Alumni de la Fondation Universitaire, 1979 (awarded every five years to a Belgian economist under 36)
- Fellow of the Econometric Society, 1980
- Fellow of the Econometrics Journal, 2007

== Publications ==
Jean-François Richard has been extensively involved with publications in econometrics and related fields. He is the author or coauthor of over 100 publications listed in Google Scholar, including:

- Use of Prior Information in the Analysis and Estimation of Cobb-Douglas Production Function Models, (with A. Zellner), International Economic Review, 14(1), 1973, 107–119.
- Bayesian Inference in Error-in-Variables Models, (with J.P. Florens and M. Mouchart), Journal of Multivariate Analysis, 1974, 419–452.
- A Note on the Information Matrix of the Multivariate Normal Distribution, Journal of Econometrics, 3, 1975, 57–60
- Bayesian Analysis of the Regression Model when the Disturbances are Generated by an Autoregressive Process, in New Developments in the Applications of Bayesian Methods, (Chapter 11), edited by Aykac, A. and C. Brumat, North Holland, 1977, 185–210.
- Models with Several Regimes and Changes in Exogeneity, Review of Economic Studies, XLVII, 1980, 1-20. JSTOR 2297101doi:10.2307/2297101

His 1973 paper "Exogeneity" JSTOR 1911990 (with Robert F. Engle and David F. Hendry) has been cited over 2,250 times in other publications.

He has held editorial positions at five economics journals and the series Advanced Textbooks in Economics, and has served as a referee for eighteen journals.
