= Isabelle Thomas (geographer) =

Professor of geography

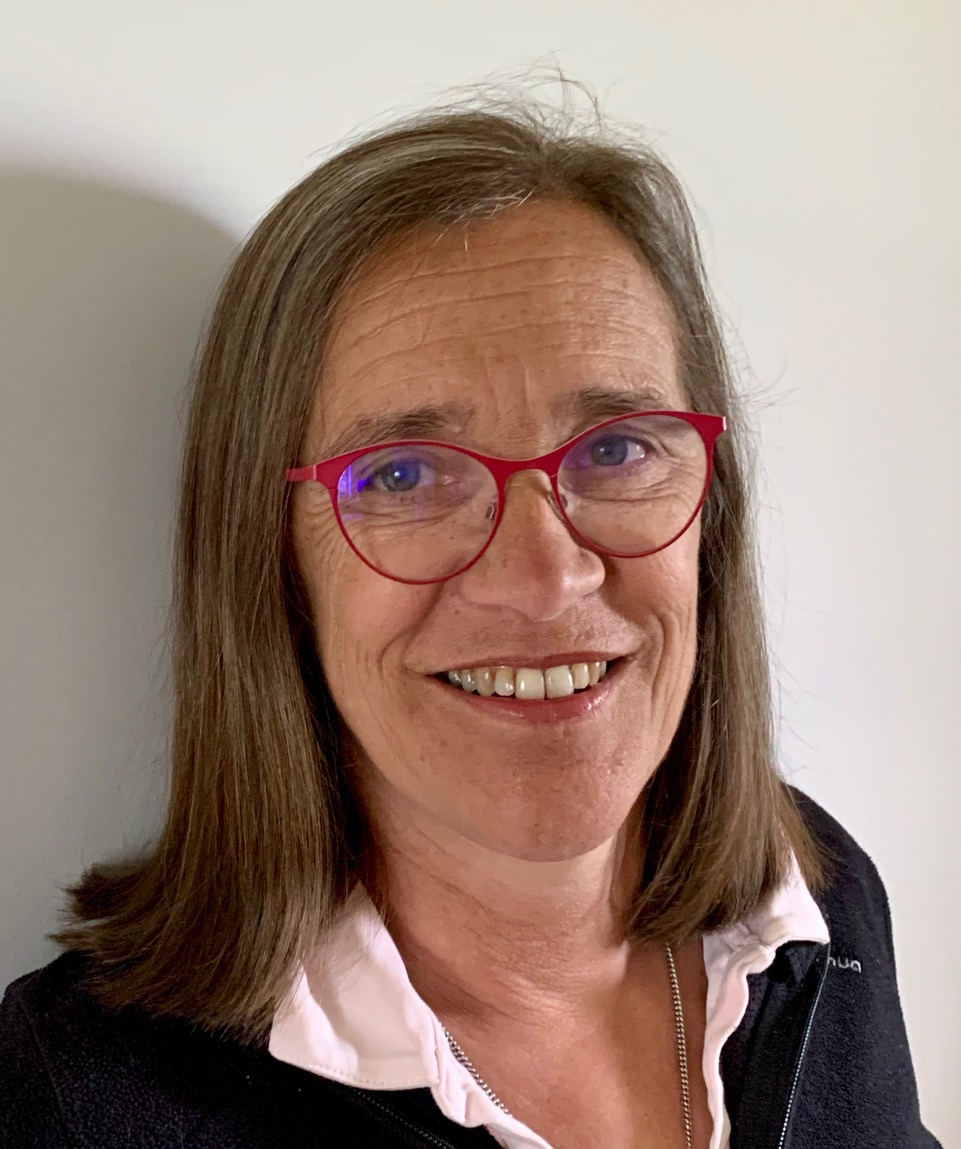
- Born: 1956 (age 69–70)
- Awards: Edward L. Ullman Award

Isabelle Thomas is a professor of geography at the Université Catholique de Louvain in Belgium and research director of the National Fund for Scientific Research. She is member of the Center for Operations Research and Econometrics (CORE)

== Education and career ==
Thomas earned a Master's degree (1979) and PhD (1984) in geography from Université Catholique de Louvain.

For most of her career, Thomas has held academic positions except for five years (1987–1991) that she spent at the headquarters of the Belgian police force studying the spatial structures of road accidents.

Since 1992, her research work has been focusing on transport, economic and quantitative geography.

Her main research topics are:

- Modelling optimal locations of human activities and more particularly the sensitivity of the location-allocation and transportation models to their geographical inputs;
- Applied quantitative analysis for spatial data with topics such as scale;
- M.A.U.P. : Modifiable Areal Unit Problem;
- Autocorrelation;
- Statistical mapping;
- Landscape morphometrics;
- Transport geography;
- Cartography;
- Big Data

Application domains are mainly socio-economic and transportation issues in Belgium. From 2016 to 2019 she was research director of the Center for Operations Research and Econometrics.

== Awards and honours ==
- 2019: RSAI Fellow
- 2017: Edward L. Ullman Award of the Association of American Geographers
- 2015: Belgian Francqui Chair. Measuring and Modelling in Economic and Transport Geography: challenges and opportunities"
- 2012: Compagnie du Bois Sauvage Award for the Best Complete Scientific multidisciplinary project
- 2001: BMW Scientific Prize on the theme "Innovation for a Mobile Future"
- 1990: SAS Best Graph and Cartography Award
- 1989: Philippe Aydalot Prize in regional Science
