= George Nemhauser =

American operations researcher (born 1937)

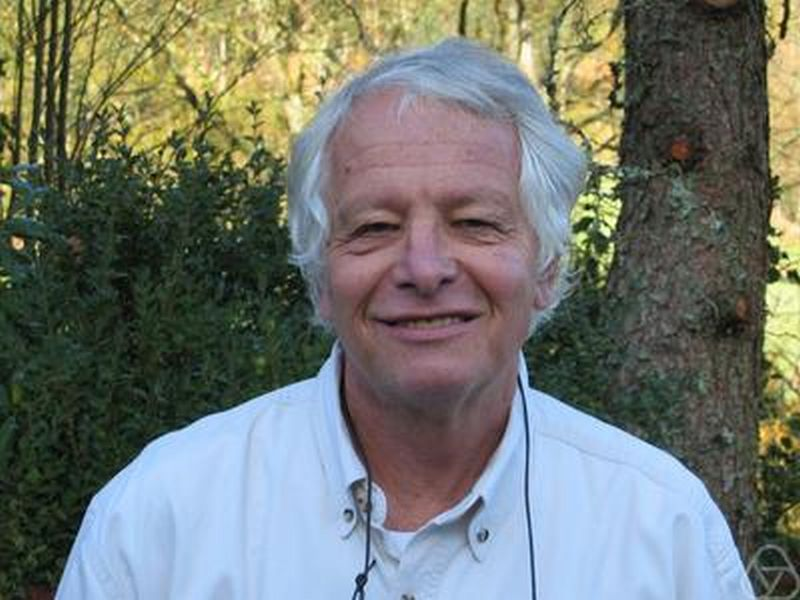
- Nemhauser in 2005
- Born: 1937 (age 88–89); The Bronx, New York
- Education: City College of New York (B.Ch.E., 1958); Northwestern University (M.S., 1959) (PH.D., 1961)
- Awards: Lanchester Prize (1977, 1990); George E. Kimball Medal (1988); Khachiyan Prize (2010); John Von Neumann Theory Prize (2012)
- Scientific career
- Fields: Operations Research
- Workplaces: Johns Hopkins University (1961–1969); Cornell University (1970–1983); Georgia Institute of Technology (1985–2021)
- Doctoral students: Gérard Cornuéjols

George Lann Nemhauser (born 1937) is an American operations researcher, the A. Russell Chandler III Chair and Institute Professor of Industrial and Systems Engineering at the Georgia Institute of Technology and the former president of the Operations Research Society of America.

== Biography ==
Nemhauser was born in The Bronx, New York, and did his undergraduate education at the City College of New York, graduating with a degree in chemical engineering in 1958. He earned his Ph.D. in operations research in 1961 from Northwestern University, under the supervision of Jack Mitten. He taught at Johns Hopkins University from 1961 to 1969, and then moved to Cornell University, where he held the Leon C. Welch endowed chair in operations research. He moved to the Georgia Institute of Technology in 1985.

He was president of ORSA in 1981, chair of the Mathematical Programming Society, and founding editor of the journal Operations Research Letters.

== Research ==
Nemhauser's research concerns large mixed integer programming problems and their applications. He is one of the co-inventors of the branch and price method for solving integer linear programs. He also contributed important early studies of approximation algorithms for facility location problems and for submodular optimization. Nemhauser, together with Leslie Trotter, showed in 1975 that the optimal solution to the weighted vertex cover problem contains all the nodes that have a value of 1 in the linear programming relaxation as well as some of the nodes that have a value of 0.5.

== Books ==
Nemhauser is the author of

- Introduction to Dynamic Programming (Wiley, 1966)
- Integer Programming (with Robert Garfinkel, Wiley, 1972, MR 0381688)
- Integer and Combinatorial Optimization (with Laurence A. Wolsey, Wiley, 1988, MR 0948455).
- Optimization (with A. H. G. Rinnooy Kan and Michael J. Todd, North-Holland, 1989)

== Awards and honors ==
Nemhauser was elected as a member of the National Academy of Engineering in 1986, a fellow of INFORMS in 2002, and a fellow of the Society for Industrial and Applied Mathematics in 2008. He has won five awards from INFORMS: the George E. Kimball Medal for distinguished service to INFORMS and to the profession in 1988, the Frederick W. Lanchester Prize in 1977 for a paper on approximation algorithms for facility location and again in 1989 for his textbook Integer and Combinatorial Optimization, the Phillip McCord Morse Lectureship Award in 1992, the first Optimization Society Khachiyan Prize for Life-time Accomplishments in Optimization in 2010, and the John von Neumann Theory Prize in 2012 (together with Laurence Wolsey).
