= Journal of Futures Markets =

- Discipline: Finance
- Language: English
- Edited by: Bart Frijns

Publication details
- History: 1981–present
- Publisher: Wiley-Blackwell
- Frequency: Monthly
- Impact factor: 1.9 (2022)

Standard abbreviations
- ISO 4: J. Futures Mark.

Indexing
- ISSN: 1096-9934

Links
- Journal homepage; Online access; Online archive

Journal of Futures Markets is a monthly peer-reviewed academic journal covers developments in financial futures and derivatives. The editor-in-chief is Bart Frijns. The journal covers subjects including: futures, derivatives, risk management and control, financial engineering, new financial instruments, hedging strategies, analysis of trading systems, legal, accounting, and regulatory issues, and portfolio optimization. It is published by Wiley-Blackwell.

According to the Journal Citation Reports, its 2022 impact factor is 1.9.
