= Children's geographies =

Experience of places in children's lives

Children's geographies is an area of study within human geography and childhood studies that involves researching the places and spaces of children's lives.

== Context ==
Children's geographies is the branch of human geography and childhood studies dealing with the study of places and spaces of children's lives, characterised experientially, politically and ethically.

Ever since the cultural turn in geography, there has been recognition that society is not homogeneous but heterogeneous. It is characterised by diversity, differences and subjectivities. While feminist geographers were able to strengthen the need for examination of gender, class and race as issues affecting women, 'children' as an umbrella term that encompasses children, teenagers, youths and young people is still relatively missing a 'frame of reference' in the complexities of 'geographies'. In the act of theorising about children and their geographies, the ways of doing research and the assumed ontological realities often frame children and adults in ways that impose a binary, hierarchical and developmental model. This reproduces and enforces the hegemony of adult-centred discourses of children within knowledge production.

=== Development of children's geographies as a field ===
Children's geographies has developed in academic human geography since the beginning of the 1990s, although there were notable studies in the area before that date. The earliest work done on children's geographies can largely be traced to William Bunge's work on spatial oppression of children in Detroit and Toronto, where children are deemed as the ones who suffer the most under an oppressing adult framework of social, cultural and political forces controlling the urban-built environment. This development emerged from the realisation that previously human geography had largely ignored the everyday lives of children, who form a significant section of society, have specific needs and capacities, and may experience the world in very different ways. Thus children's geographies can in part be seen in parallel to an interest in gender in geography and feminist geography insomuch as their starting points were the gender blindness of mainstream academic geography.

Children's geographies also shares many of the underpinning principles of childhood studies, the so-called new social studies of childhood, and the sociology of the family—namely, that childhood is a social construction and that scholars should pay greater attention to children's voices and agency, although recent 'new wave' scholarship has challenged these principles (Kraftl, 2013).

Children's geographies rests on the idea that children as a social group share certain characteristics that are experientially, politically and ethically significant and worthy of study. The pluralisation in the title is intended to imply that children's lives will be markedly different in various times and places and in various circumstances such as gender, family and class. The current developments in children's geographies are attempting to link the frame of analysing it to one that requires multiple perspectives and willingness to acknowledge the 'multiplicity' of their geographies.

Children's geographies is sometimes coupled with, yet distinguished from, the geographies of childhood. The former has an interest in the everyday lives of children; the latter has an interest in how adult society conceives of the very idea of childhood and how this impinges on children's lives in many ways. This includes imaginations about the nature of children and the related spatial implications. In an early article, Holloway and Valentine termed these 'spatial discourses'.

=== Areas and topics of study ===
Children's geographies can be observed through the various lenses provided by foci (plural of focus), thus the plurality inspired by post-modern and post-structural social geographers (Panelli, 2009). These foci include, but are not limited to, the history of its emergence (key authors and texts), the nature of the child (geographical concepts, family contexts, society contexts, gender variation; aged-based variation, cultural variation); children in the environment (home, school, play, neighbourhood, street, city, country, landscapes of consumption, cyberspace); designing environments for children (children as planners, utopian visions); environmental hazards (traffic, health and environment, accidents); indirect experience of place (not medium-specific, literature, TV and cyberspace); social issues (children's fears, parent's fears for their children, poverty and deprivation, work, migration, social hazards, crime and deviance); citizenship and agency (environmental action, local politics, interest in the environment); and children's geographical knowledge (environmental cognition, understanding of the physical environment) (McKendrick, 2000).

The methodologies of researching children's worlds and the ethics of doing so have also been distinguished by the otherness of childhood.

=== Theoretical trends ===
For some years, critics argued that scholarship in children's geographies was characterised by a lack of theoretical diversity and 'block politics'. However, since the mid-2000s, the subdiscipline has seen a proliferation and diversification of theoretical work away from the social constructivist principles of childhood studies and the new social studies of childhood. A major influential trend has been the development of non-representational theory by children's geographers, especially scholars such as Peter Kraftl, John Horton, Matej Blazek, Veronica Pacini-Ketchabaw, Affrica Taylor, Pauliina Rautio and Kim Kullman. This work shares many theoretical influences with a so-called 'new wave' of childhood studies, and especially the influence of poststructural, new materialist and feminist theorists such as Gilles Deleuze, Rosi Braidotti, Donna Haraway and Jane Bennett (a political theorist).

For instance, in a series of articles, John Horton and Peter Kraftl have challenged a sense of 'what matters' in scholarship with children—from the material objects, emotions and affects that characterise 'participation' to the ways in which our embodied engagements with place in childhood are carried forward into adulthood, thereby scrambling any neat notion of 'transition' from childhood to adulthood. Elsewhere, Veronica Pacini-Ketchabaw and Affrica Taylor have developed new approaches to understanding the 'common worlds' of children and a range of nonhuman species, including both domestic and 'wild' animals. Their active 'common-worlds' research collective brings together a range of scholars who seek to explore how children's lives are entangled with those of nonhumans in ways that challenge oppressive, colonial and/or neoliberal views of the human as an individuated subject somehow distanced from 'nature'.

Recently, there has been vibrant debate about the political value of non-representational approaches to childhood. Some scholars argue that non-representational theories encourage a focus upon the banal, everyday, ephemeral and small-scale at the expense of understanding and critically interrogating wider-scaled and longer-standing processes of marginalisation. Others argue that, whilst valid, non-representational and 'new wave' approaches extend beyond the small-scale, offering useful and in some cases fundamental ways to critically and creatively re-think the ways of doing research with children and their 'common worlds'.

A second key conceptual trend has been in work on subjectivity, children's political geography and emotion. For instance, Louise Holt (2013) uses the work of Judith Butler to critically examine the emergence of the infant as a 'subject' through power relations that are often gendered, as well as infanthood as a stage in the course of life that is subject to particular kinds of social construction. Elsewhere, there has been a surge in interest in children's political geographies, that has to some extent been informed both by developments in non-representational theory and in theories of subjectivity. Central to this scholarship (especially in the work of Tracey Skelton, Kirsi Pauliina Kallio and Jouni Hakli) has been a move beyond a traditional concern with children's participation in decision-making processes to highlight the range of ways in which they may be 'political'—from 'micropolitical' engagements with ethnic or social divisions in the school or the street to critical considerations of major policy documents such as the Convention on the Rights of the Child.

Louise Holt's work on subjectivity also connects with a wider, ongoing interest in the emotional geography of childhood and youth (Bartos, 2012, Blazek, 2013), which, although overlapping with interests in non-representational children's geographies, also has its roots in feminist theory. Such approaches informed early texts that were important to the early development of children's geographies, particularly in Sarah Holloway's work on parenting and local childcare cultures. More recently, there has been a reinvigoration of interest in the study of parenting, some of which has driven theorisations of the emotions that characterise the intimacy of parent/caregiver-child relationships—especially where these are cut across by policies designed to intervene into the spaces of parenting. This work has therefore linked together the apparently small-scale concerns of intimate family life with larger concerns such as government policy-making and school-based interventions.

== Needed research areas ==
Because the age range assumed to constitute childhood is quite vague within the cumulative research of children's geographies, it is evident that the multitude of environments that children experience will be quite broad. The array of spaces and places experienced by children includes, but is not restricted to, homes, schools, playgrounds, neighbourhoods, streets, cities, countries, landscapes of consumption and cyberspace. As environment has been noted by a multitude of social geographers to entail a sociospatial aspect, Over time, recognition of the multiplicity of the term 'environment' has both diverged and converged as social geography has evolved (Valentine, 2001; Bowlby, 2001).

=== Importance of school environment ===
Although schools are a relatively large institution in society, it has been noted that this environment has received little recognition in comparison to institutions of health (Collins and Coleman, 2008). Collins and Coleman also note the centrality of schools in everyday life, as they are 'found in almost every urban and suburban neighbourhood' and most children experience considerable time within this environment in their day-to-day lives. The role of the school environment in children's life is central to their development, especially in respect to society's inclusionary and exclusionary processes experienced firsthand in schools (MacCrae, Maguire and Milbourne, 2002). The manifestation of social exclusion as bullying is an interpersonal sociospatial aspect the implications of which have been extensively researched both within school boundaries and technological enablement (Olweus and Limber, 2010; Black, Washington, Trent, Harner and Pollock, 2009). School, therefore, is not only a place where children learn quantifiable subjects but also a learning ground for life interaction skills needed later on.

Research in children's geographies has been central to the development of scholarship on 'geographies of education'. For many commentators, this work—which spans social geography, cultural geography, political geography and urban geography—does not yet constitute an identifiable subdiscipline of human geography. However, geographers have held an enduring concern with education spaces, extending to and beyond school, as Collins and Coleman identify. This work has burgeoned in recent years, with a number of special issues dedicated to education and emotion, embodiment and the cultural geographies of education. Yet, as Holloway et al. (2010) argue, the role and significance of children, young people and families has been underplayed in debate on geographies of education. Not only have children's geographers undertaken a huge range of research in schools but also has that work been central in developing geographers' understandings of education spaces more widely and schools in particular.

=== Alternative educational spaces ===
Although most research by children's and youth geographers on education has focussed on institutions like schools and universities, it has been challenged in a number of ways by scholarship on the geographies of alternative education. Examining a diverse range of non-state-funded, explicitly 'alternative', education spaces in the UK (like homeschooling, Waldorf education, Montessori education, forest school and care farming), Peter Kraftl examines the connections and disconnections between 'mainstream' and 'alternative' education sectors. Drawing on non-representational children's geographies, he explores how alternative educators work to intervene into children's bodily habits, how they create spaces in which mess and disorder are valorised, and how they work with conceptions of 'nature' that both resonate with and critically counter mainstream assumptions about children's disengagement with 'nature' in Western societies (see nature deficit disorder). In doing so, alternative educators are attempting to create 'alter-childhoods'—alternative constructions, imaginations and ways of treating childhood that are knowingly different from a perceived mainstream.

The implications of homeschooling have largely been a field of assumptions, taking after common myths (Romanowki, 2010), although later work by geographers has examined in considerable detail the significance of space, place, emotion and materiality to the experiences of homeschoolers. The variance between public and private sector institutions and the implications of social status of children within the school community has also been a contentious field (Nissan and Carter, 2010).

=== School-based social interaction ===
As children grow, they look to the influential adults in their lives (parents, caregivers and teachers) for guidance. Most researchers and adults alike agree that communication is key to healthy child development across all modal environments, especially within schools (Lasky, 2000; Hargreaves, 2000; Hargreaves and Fullan, 1998; Hargreaves and Lasky, 2004). Lasky's focus remains on the cultural and emotional dynamic between teachers and the parents of their students, whereas Hargreaves continuously exemplifies through his data the significant improvement in child performance at school because of an equal power-play communication between teachers and parents/caregivers. Where there may be a lack of influential adults, children may look to older-age groups within the school environment to observe acceptable behaviours and attention-seeking ones.

Research has begun to display the components of the 'high-quality experience' provided by controlled school-based mentoring relationships (Ahrens et al., 2011). However, other research disputes that the experience is as helpful as it claims to be, suggesting child-mentoring situations often fall short or are only temporarily beneficial (Spencer, 2007; Pryce, 2012). Pryce's research highlights that the mentor's attunement to the other's needs highly indicates the beneficial nature of the mentor relationship.

=== Introduction of technology in children's learning ===
The introduction of technology into children's lives has provided a new platform upon which the school environment is no longer contained within a physical space. The previous temporal and geographical constrictions of place have been mobilised by use of the Internet. The outcomes of this mobilisation have been both constructive and destructive in the availability of learning material to children (Sancho, 2004) and more extrapersonal interactions among children. The educational benefit of ICT (information and communications technology) in the classroom has been a subject supported by various researchers (Aviram and Talmi, 2004).

=== Schools' role in creation of social identity ===
The school is an institution in which children observe one another and experiment continuously with their self-image (Hernandez, 2004). Hernandez's research recognises a need to view children as individuals and to incorporate their 'personal maps' into the educational process, so the gap between the school environment and the external environment does not dangerously widen.

Awareness of the centrality of schools to social geography is very important. Public institutions in Canada and the USA were defined as 'nation-building institutions, which sought to create common citizens from ethnically, linguistically and religiously diverse populations' (Moore, 2000; Sweet, 1997). The connection between nation-building and public education has held the view that schools shape the knowledge and identities of children (Collins and Coleman, 2008). Whether the connection is seen to create negative, destructive social norms or positive, constructive progressive values is dependent 'on one's broader political/moral compass' (Collins, 2006; Hunter 1991).

== See also ==
- Children's culture
- Children's street culture
- Cultural geography
- Feminist geography
- Home zone
- Student transport
