= Human geography =

Study of cultures, communities, people, lifestyle, and activities of people of the world

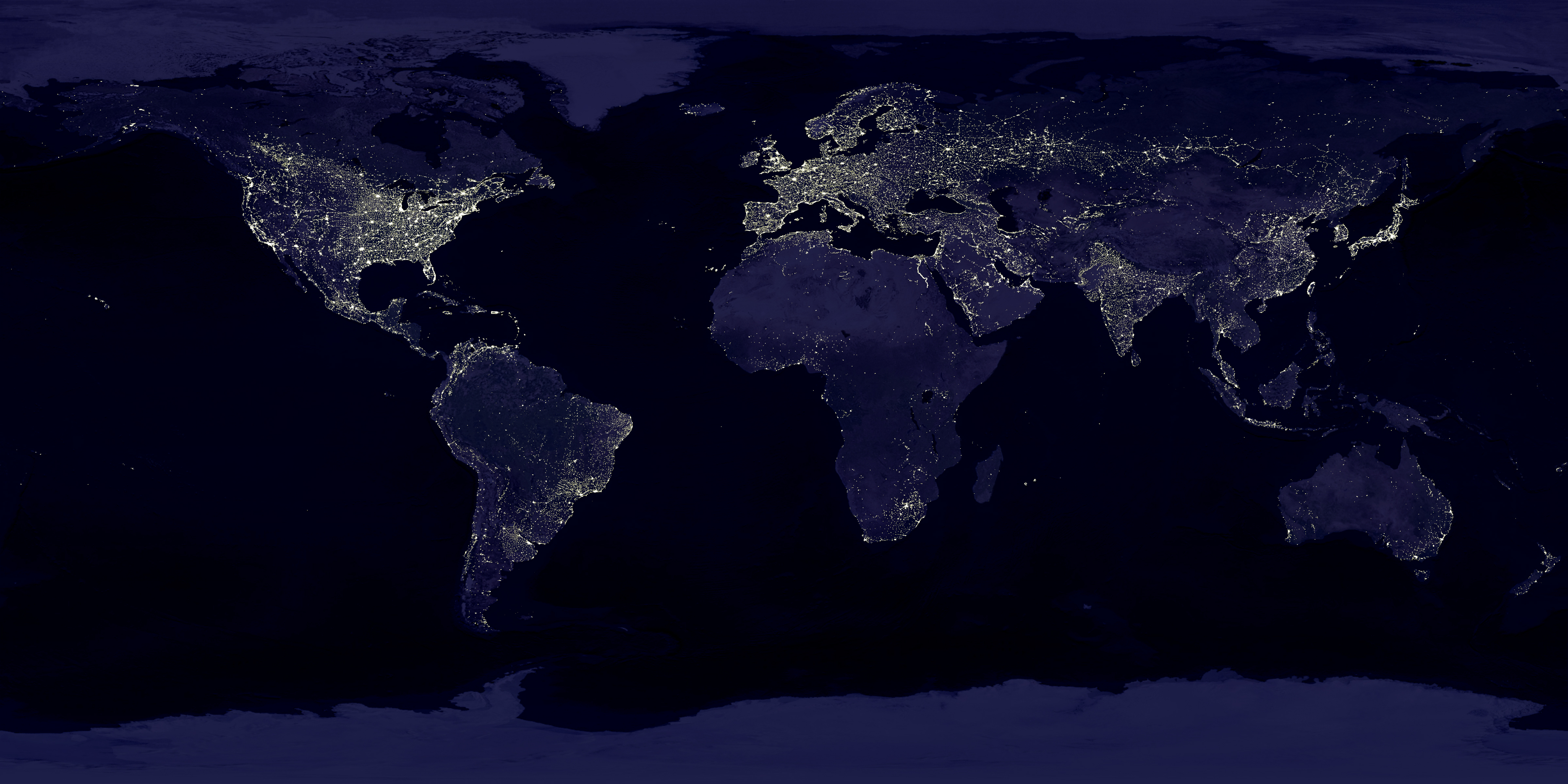
Earth's City Lights by DMSP, 1994-1995 (large)

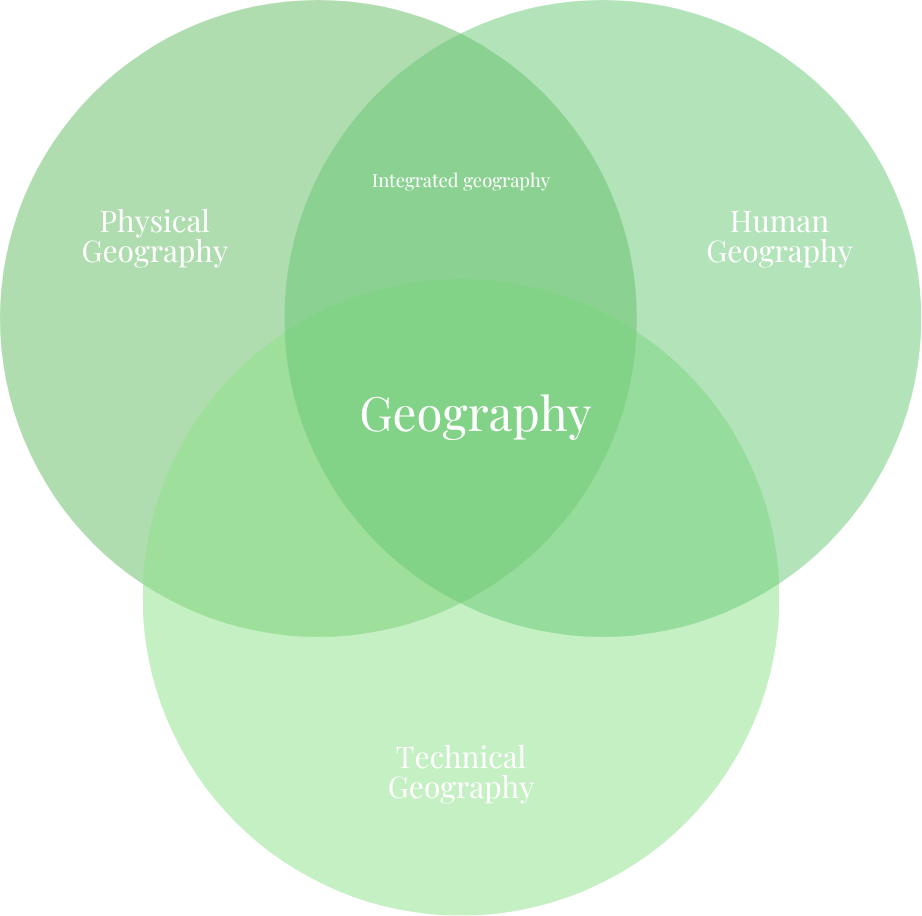
The relationship between the three branches of geography.

Human geography, also known as anthropogeography, is a branch of geography that studies how people interact with habitats. It focuses on the spatial relationships between human communities, cultures, economies, people, lifestyles, and their environments. Examples include patterns like urban sprawl and urban redevelopment. It looks at how social interactions connect with the environment using both qualitative (descriptive) and quantitative (numerical) methods. This multidisciplinary field draws from sociology, anthropology, economics, and environmental science, helping build a more complete understanding of how human activity shapes the spaces we live in.

== History ==
The Royal Geographical Society was founded in England in 1830. The first professor of geography in the United Kingdom was appointed in 1883, and the first major geographical intellect to emerge in the UK was Halford John Mackinder, appointed professor of geography at the London School of Economics in 1922.

The National Geographic Society was founded in the United States in 1888 and began publication of the National Geographic magazine, which became, and continues to be, a great popularizer of geographic information. The society has long supported geographic research and education.

The Association of American Geographers was founded in 1904 and was renamed the American Association of Geographers in 2016 to reflect the increasingly international character of its membership.

Original mapping by John Snow showing the clusters of cholera cases in the London epidemic of 1854, which is a classical case of using human geography.

One of the first examples of geographic methods being used for purposes other than describing and theorizing the physical properties of the Earth is John Snow's map of the 1854 Broad Street cholera outbreak. Though Snow was primarily a physician and a pioneer of epidemiology rather than a geographer, his map is probably one of the earliest examples of health geography.

The now-fairly-distinct differences between the subfields of physical and human geography emerged later. The connection between the physical and human properties of geography is most apparent in the theory of environmental determinism, popularized in the 19th century by Carl Ritter and others, and it has close links to the field of evolutionary biology of the time. Environmental determinism is the theory that people's physical, mental, and moral habits are directly due to the influence of their natural environment. However, by the mid-19th century, environmental determinism was under attack for lacking methodological rigor associated with modern science, and later as a means to justify racism and imperialism.

A similar concern with both human and physical aspects is apparent during the later 19th and first half of the 20th centuries, focused on regional geography. The goal of regional geography was to delineate space into regions and then to understand and describe the unique characteristics of each region in both human and physical terms. With links to possibilism and cultural ecology, some of the same notions of the environment's causal effect on society and culture remain in environmental determinism.

By the 1960s, however, the quantitative revolution led to strong criticism of regional geography. Due to a perceived lack of scientific rigor in an overly descriptive nature of the discipline, and a continued separation of geography from its two subfields of physical and human geography and from geology, geographers in the mid-20th century began to apply statistical and mathematical models to solve spatial problems. Much of the development during the quantitative revolution is now apparent in the use of geographic information systems; the use of statistics, spatial modeling, and positivist approaches is still important to many branches of human geography. Well-known geographers from this period are Fred K. Schaefer, Waldo Tobler, William Garrison, Peter Haggett, Richard J. Chorley, William Bunge, and Torsten Hägerstrand.

From the 1970s, many critiques of the positivism now associated with geography emerged. Known as 'critical geography,' these critiques signaled another turning point in the discipline. Behavioral geography emerged over time as a means of understanding how people perceived spaces and places and made locational decisions. The more influential 'radical geography' emerged in the 1970s and 1980s. It draws heavily on Marxist theory and techniques and is associated with geographers such as David Harvey and Richard Peet.

Radical geographers seek to say meaningful things about problems recognized through quantitative methods, provide explanations rather than descriptions, put forward alternatives and solutions, and be politically engaged, rather than using the detachment associated with positivists. (The detachment and objectivity of the quantitative revolution was itself critiqued by radical geographers as being a tool of capital). Radical geography and the links to Marxism and related theories remain an important part of contemporary human geography (See: Antipode). Critical geography also saw the introduction of 'humanistic geography', associated with the work of Yi-Fu Tuan, which advocated a much more qualitative approach to methodology.

The changes under critical geography have led to contemporary approaches in the discipline, such as feminist geography, new cultural geography, settlement geography, and the engagement with postmodern and post-structural theories and philosophies.

== Fields ==
The primary fields of study in human geography focus on the core fields of:

=== Cultures ===
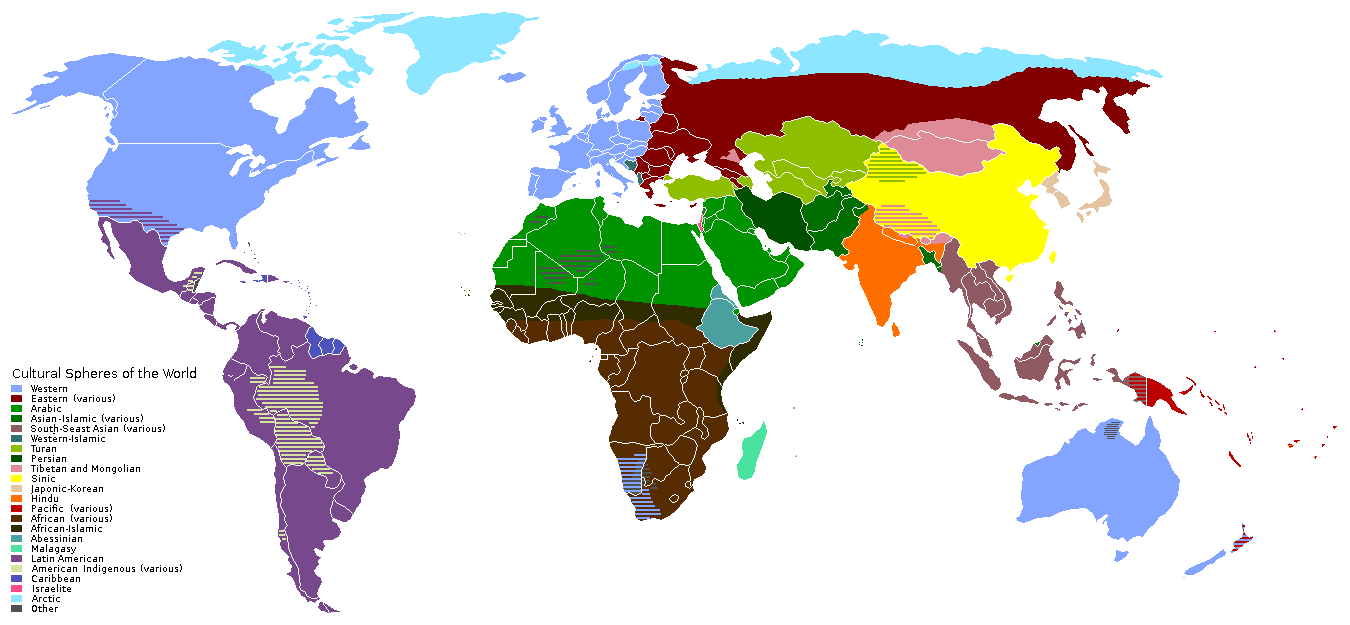
A world map illustrating cultural areas.

Cultural geography is a subfield within human geography. Though the first traces of the study of different nations and cultures on Earth can be dated back to ancient geographers such as Ptolemy or Strabo, cultural geography as an academic study first emerged as an alternative to the environmental determinist theories of the early 20th century, which had believed that people and societies are controlled by the environment in which they develop. Rather than studying predetermined regions based on environmental classifications, cultural geography became interested in cultural landscapes. This was led by the "father of cultural geography" Carl O. Sauer of the University of California, Berkeley. As a result, cultural geography was long dominated by American writers.

Geographers drawing on this tradition see cultures and societies as developing out of their local landscapes but also shaping those landscapes. This interaction between the natural landscape and humans creates the cultural landscape. This understanding is a foundation of cultural geography but has been augmented over the past forty years with more nuanced and complex concepts of culture, drawn from a wide range of disciplines including anthropology, sociology, literary theory, and feminism. No single definition of culture dominates within cultural geography. Regardless of their particular interpretation of culture, however, geographers wholeheartedly reject theories that treat culture as if it took place "on the head of a pin".

- Subfields include: Social geography, Animal geographies, Language geography, Sexuality and space, Children's geographies, and Religion geography.

=== Development ===
Development geography is the study of the Earth's geography with reference to the standard of living and the quality of life of its human inhabitants, the study of the location, distribution, and spatial organization of economic activities across the Earth. The researcher's methodological approach strongly influences the subject matter investigated.

=== Economies ===
Economic geography is the subfield of human geography that studies economic activity and factors affecting it. It can also be considered a subfield or method in economics.

Economic geography takes a variety of approaches to many different topics, including the location of industries, economies of agglomeration (also known as "linkages"), transportation, international trade, development, real estate, gentrification, ethnic economies, gendered economies, core-periphery theory, the economics of urban form, the relationship between the environment and the economy (tying into a long history of geographers studying culture-environment interaction), and globalization.

- Subfields include: Marketing geography ,Transportation geography ,Geography of industry,Geography of international trade and Geography of resources ,Geography of transport and communication ,Geography of finance and Geography of services
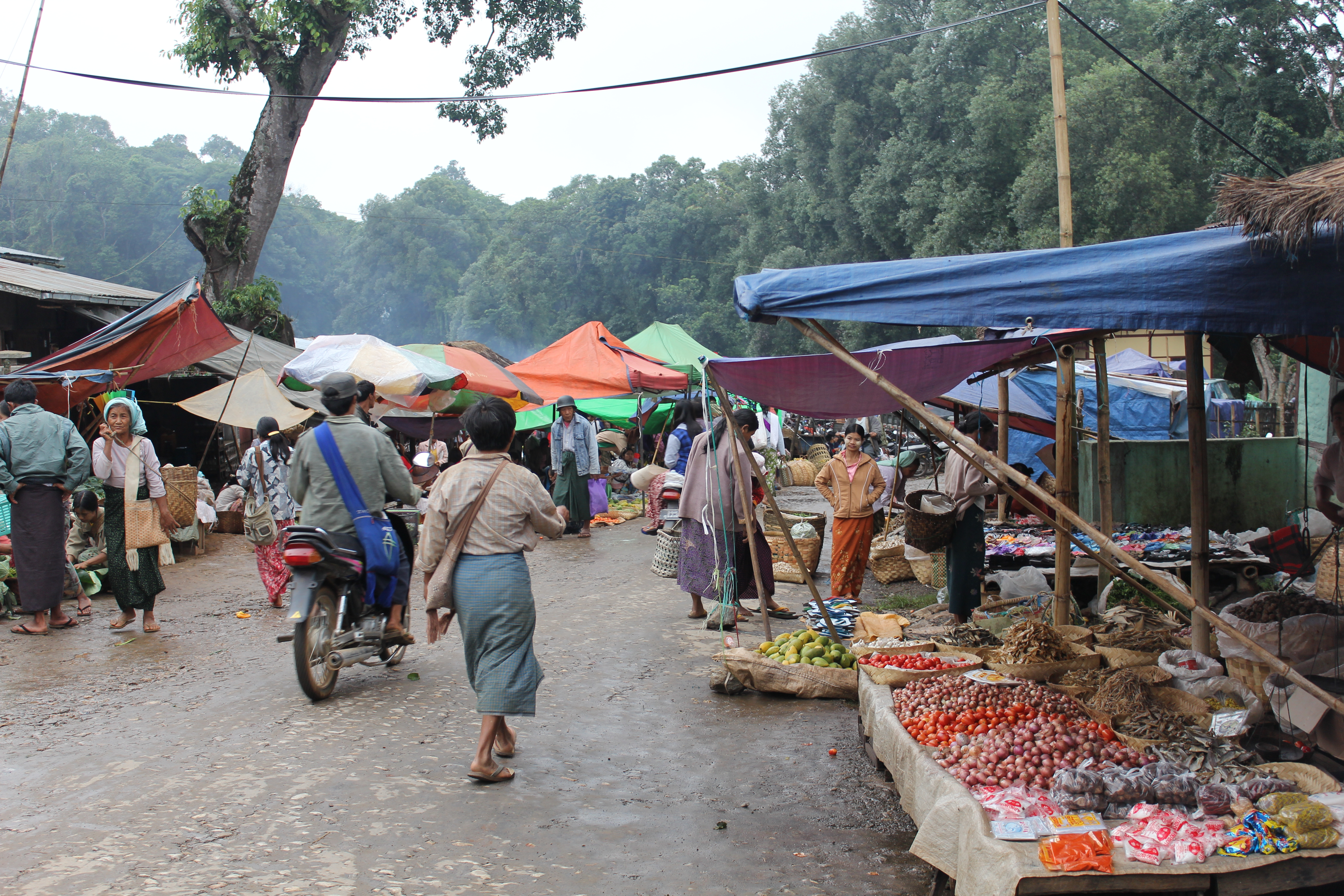
  Economic Geography: Shan street bazaar, market in Myanmar

=== Emotion ===
Emotional geography is a subtopic within human geography, more specifically cultural geography, which applies psychological theories of emotion. It is an interdisciplinary field relating emotions, geographic places and their contextual environments. These subjective feelings can be applied to individual and social contexts. Emotional geography specifically focuses on how human emotions relate to, or affect, the environment around them.

Firstly, there is a difference between emotional and affectual geography and they have their respective geographical sub-fields. The former refers to theories of expressed feelings and the social constructs of expressed feelings which can be generalisable and understood globally. The latter refers to theories underlying inexpressible feelings that are independent, embodied, and hard to understand.

Emotional geography approaches geographical concepts and research from an expressed and generalisable perspective. Historically, emotions have an ultimate adaptive significance by accentuating a non-verbal form of communication that is universal. This dates back to Darwin's theory of emotion, which explains the evolutionary development of expressed emotion. This aids individual and societal relationships as there is the presence of emotional communication. For example, when studying social phenomena, individuals' emotions can connect and create a social emotion which can define the event happening.

=== Food ===
The geography of food is a field of human geography. It focuses on patterns of food production and consumption on the local to global scale. Tracing these complex patterns helps geographers understand the unequal relationships between developed and developing countries in relation to the innovation, production, transportation, retail and consumption of food. It is also a topic that is becoming increasingly charged in the public eye. The movement to reconnect the 'space' and 'place' in the food system is growing, spearheaded by the research of geographers.

=== Health ===
Medical or health geography is the application of geographical information, perspectives, and methods to the study of health, disease, and health care. Health geography examines the spatial relationships and patterns between people and the environment. This is a subdiscipline of human geography, researching how and why diseases are spread and contained.

=== Histories ===
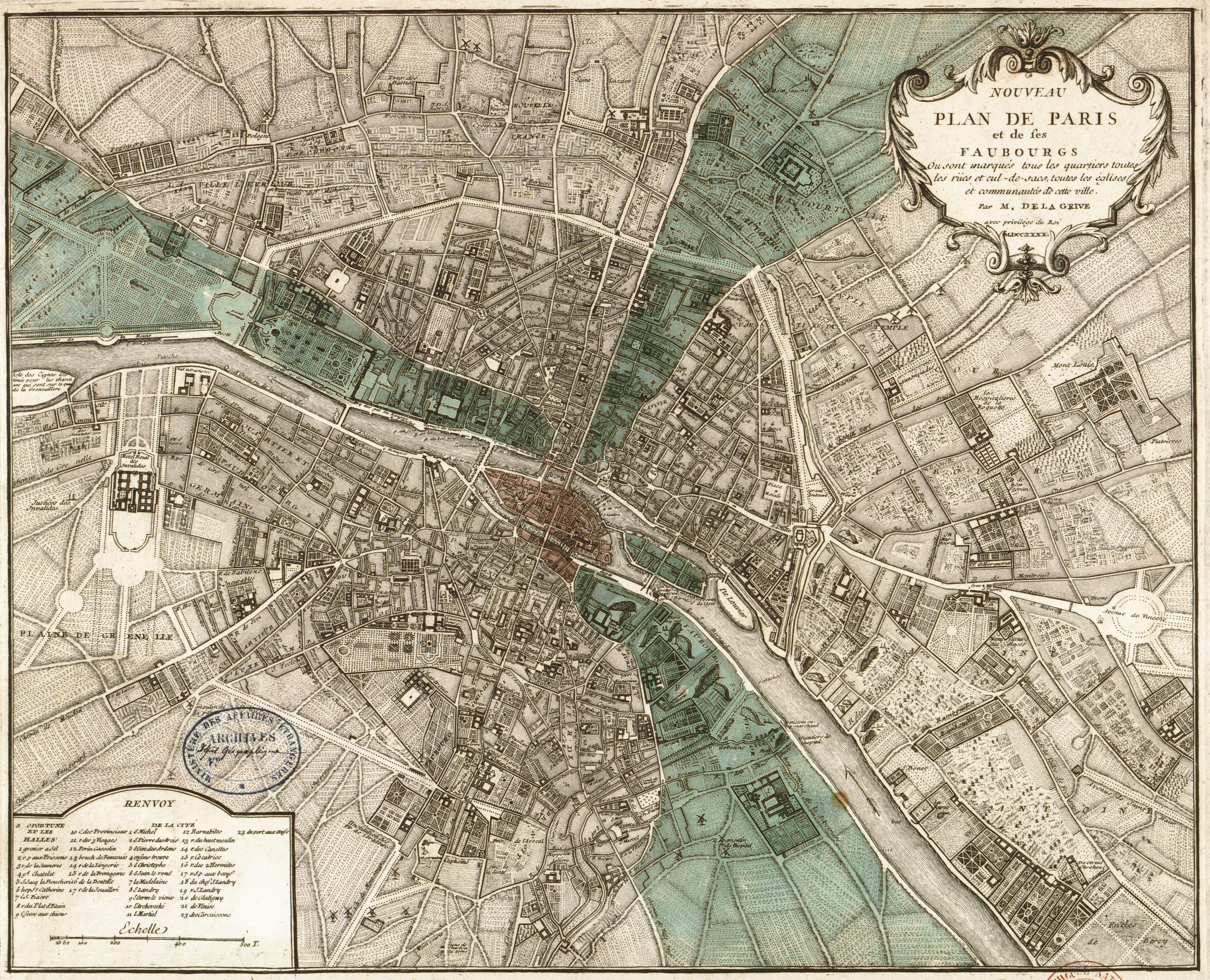
A 1740 map of Paris.

Ortelius World Map, 1570

Historical geography is the branch of geography that studies the ways in which geographic phenomena have changed over time. In its modern form, it is a synthesizing discipline which shares both topical and methodological similarities with history, anthropology, ecology, geology, environmental studies, literary studies, and other fields. Although the majority of work in historical geography is considered human geography, the field also encompasses studies of geographic change which are not primarily anthropogenic. Historical geography is often a major component of school and university curricula in geography and social studies. Current research in historical geography is being performed by scholars in more than forty countries.

- Subfields include: Archaeogeography.

=== Politics ===
Political geography is concerned with the study of both the spatially uneven outcomes of political processes and how political processes are themselves affected by spatial structures.

- Subfields include: Electoral geography, Geopolitics, Strategic geography and Military geography. The latter is fundamentally linked to the "geography of security" focusing on how spatial intelligence of a living space is leveraged to gain strategic advantages and protect national border.

=== Population ===
Satellite image of Earth at night

Population geography is the study of the distribution, composition, migration, and growth of human populations in relation to the geographic characteristics of specific area. It focuses on how populations are distributed across space, the factors influencing these distributions, and the implications for resources, environment, and societal development. This branch of geography integrates demographic data with spatial analysis to understand patterns such as population density, urbanization, and migration trends. Population geography involves demography in a geographical perspective. (Note: While population geography focuses on the impacts of population on spatial structures and processes, geodemography analyzes the effects of space on demographic structures and processes. However, the boundary between population geography and demography is becoming more and more blurred.) It focuses on the characteristics of population distributions that change in a spatial context. This often involves factors such as where population is found and how the size and composition of these population is regulated by the demographic processes of fertility, mortality, and migration.

Contributions to population geography are cross-disciplinary because geographical epistemologies related to environment, place and space have been developed at various times. Related disciplines include geography, demography, sociology, and economics.

=== Settlement ===
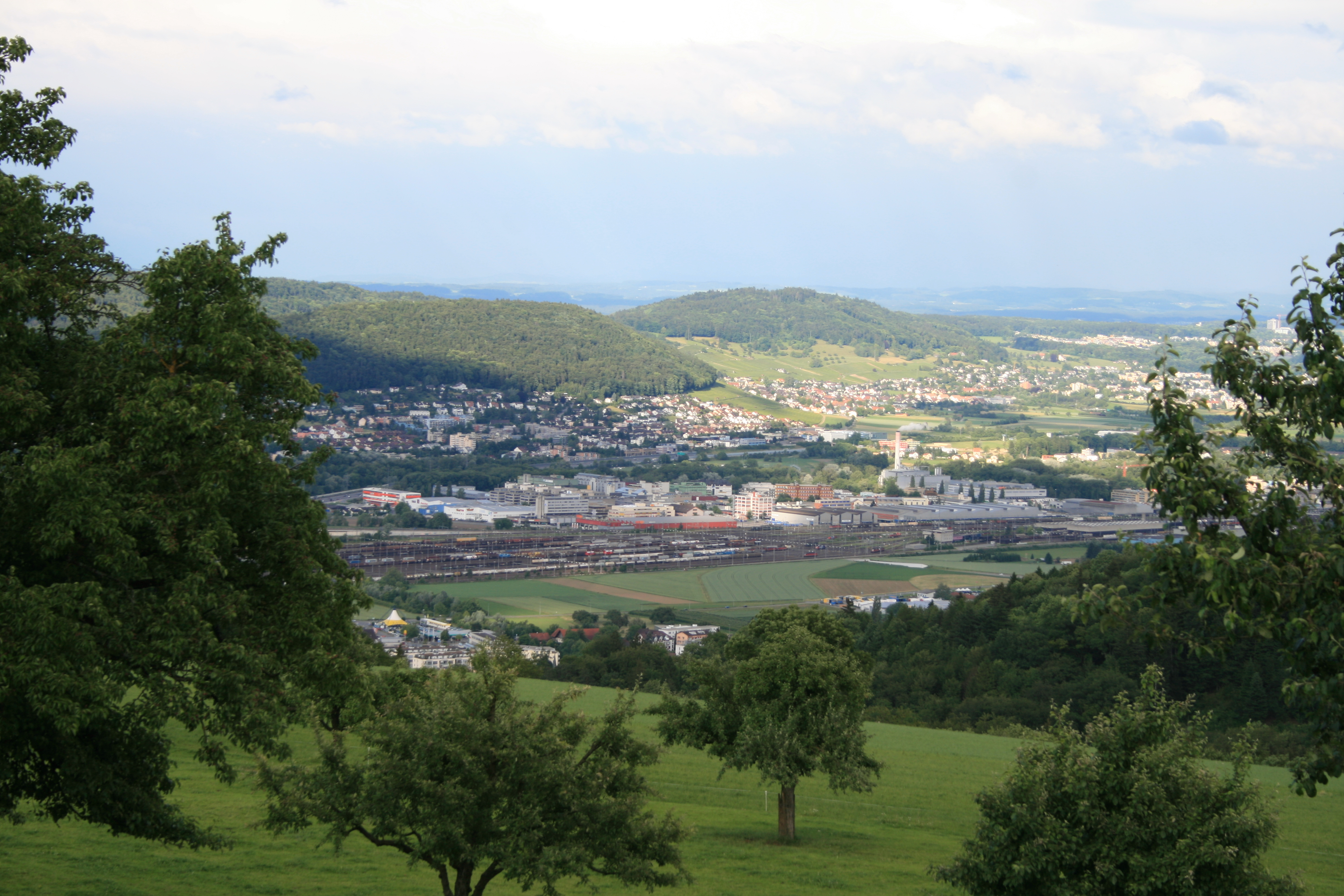
The Swiss Limmat Valley, a periurban settlement structure.

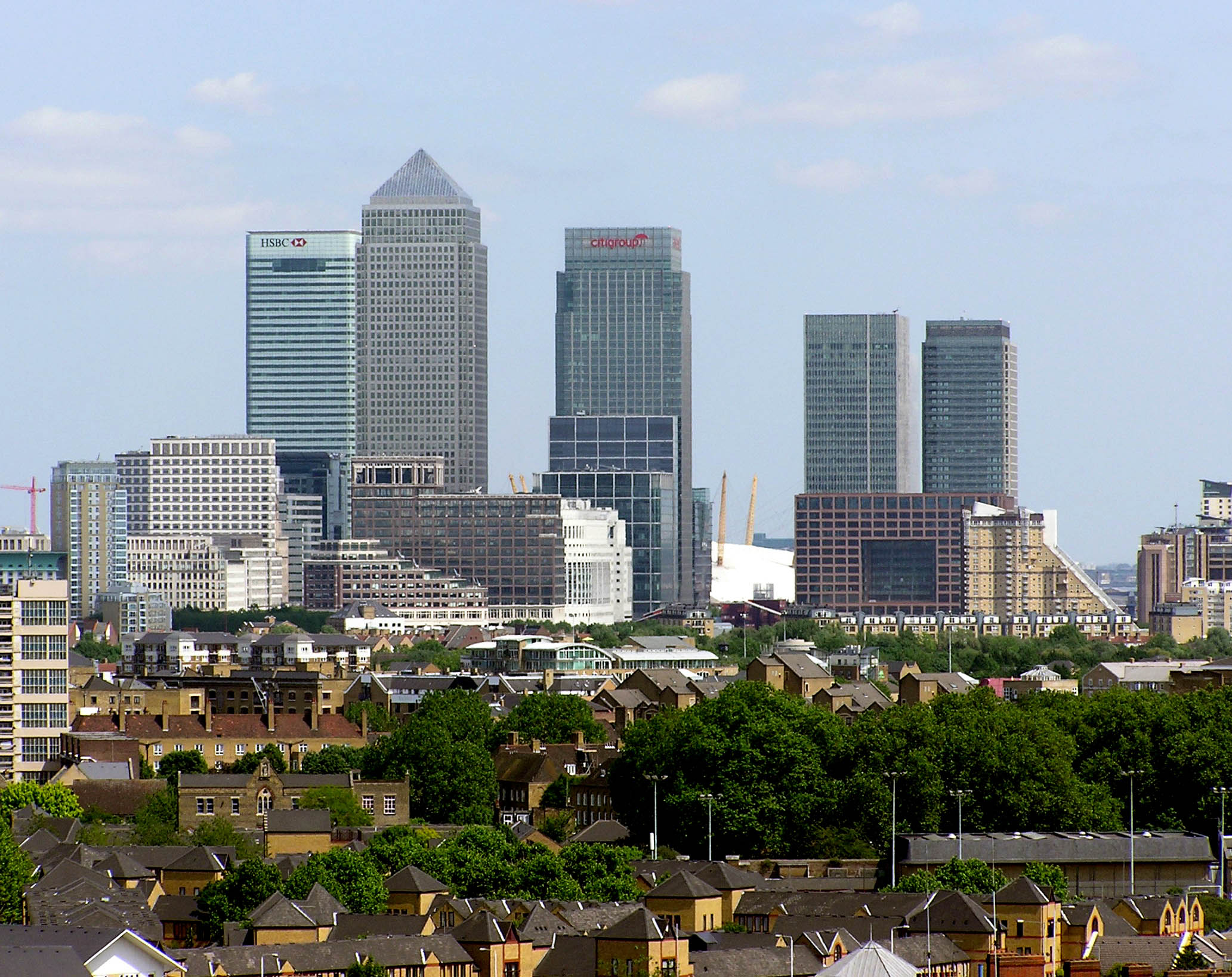
City of London

Settlement geography is a branch of human geography that investigates the Earth's surface's part settled by humans. According to the United Nations' Vancouver Declaration on Human Settlements (1976), "human settlements means the totality of the human community – whether city, town or village – with all the social, material, organizational, spiritual and cultural elements that sustain it."

=== Urbanism ===
Urban geography is the study of cities, towns, and other areas of relatively dense settlement. Two main interests are site (how a settlement is positioned relative to the physical environment) and situation (how a settlement is positioned relative to other settlements). Another area of interest is the internal organization of urban areas, including how different demographic groups are distributed and the layout of infrastructure. This subdiscipline also draws on ideas from other branches of Human Geography to see their involvement in the processes and patterns evident in an urban area. Subfields include: Economic geography, Population geography, and Settlement geography. These are clearly not the only subfields that could be used to assist in the study of Urban geography, but they are some major players.

=== Media ===
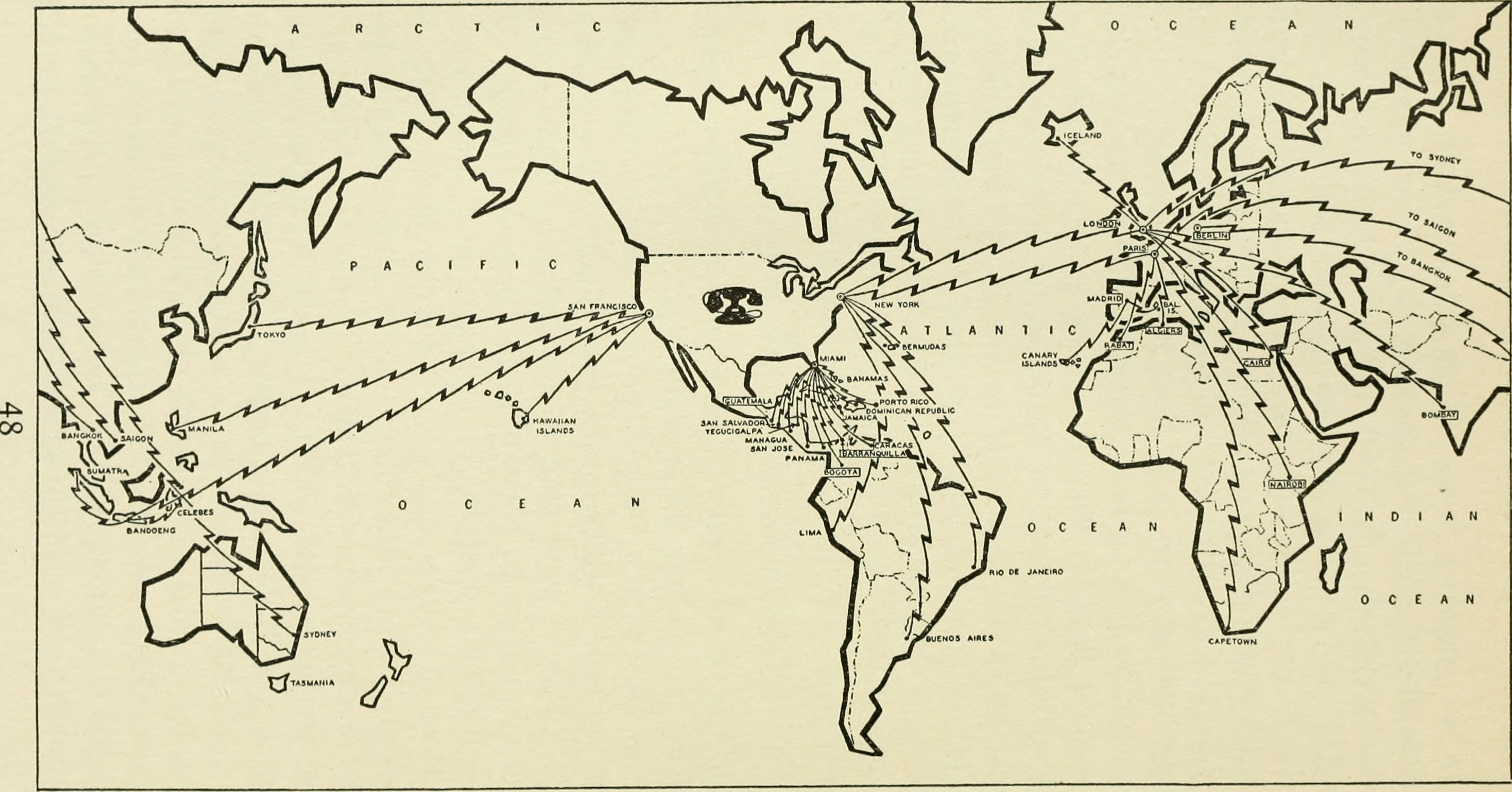
World map showing international telephone connections from Bell telephone magazine, 1922.

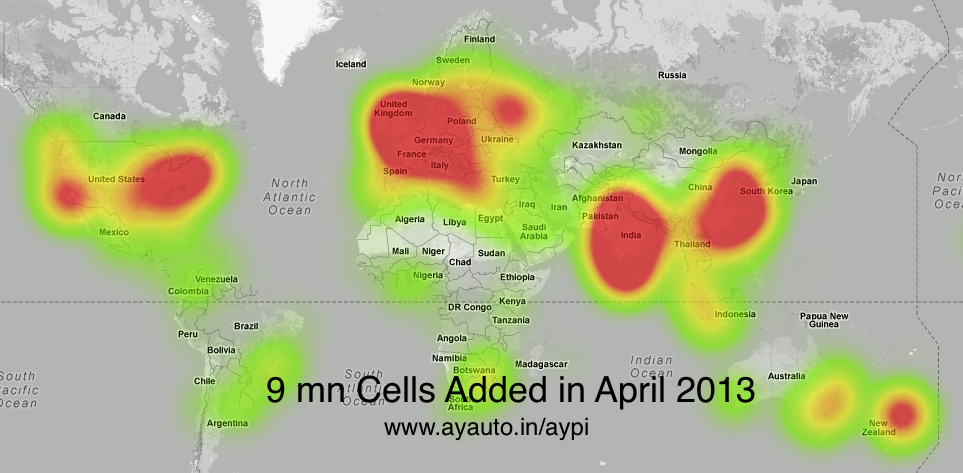
World map showing density of cell phone towers in 2013.

Geography of media and communication (also known as communication geography, media geography and geographies of media) is an interdisciplinary research area bringing together human geography with media studies and communication theory. Research addressing the geography of media and communication seeks to understand how acts of communication and the systems they depend on both shape and are shaped by geographical patterns and processes. This topic addresses the prominence of certain types of communication in differing geographical areas, including how new technology allows for new types of communication for a multitude of global locations.

=== Energy ===
Energy geography is a subfield of human geography that studies the spatial dimensions of energy systems. It examines how energy is produced, distributed, and consumed across different places, and how these processes are shaped by social, economic, political, and environmental factors. Energy geography also explores the impacts of energy systems on regions and communities, including issues such as energy access, infrastructure, environmental change, and energy justice.

=== Legal ===
Legal geography is a subfield of geography that examines the relationship between law and space, focusing on how legal systems shape spatial relations and how geographical contexts influence the production and application of law.

=== Infrastructural ===
Infrastructural geographies is a field of human geography that examines how material and organizational infrastructures—such as transport, energy, water, housing, and institutional systems—shape spatial relations, enable social and economic life, and operate as instruments through which states, institutions, and inequalities are produced and governed.

== Philosophical and theoretical approaches ==
Within each subfield, various philosophical approaches can be used in research; therefore, an urban geographer could be a Feminist or Marxist geographer, among others.

Such approaches are:

- Animal geographies
- Behavioral geography
- Cognitive geography
- Critical geography
- Feminist geography
- Marxist geography
- Non-representational theory
- Positivism
- Postcolonialism
- Poststructuralist geography
- Psychoanalytic geography
- Psychogeography
- Spatial analysis
- Time geography

== See also ==
- Areography (geography of Mars) – Delineation and characterization of Martian regions
- Concepts and Techniques in Modern Geography – Series of geography texts, 1975–1996
- History of cartography – Evolution of the art and science of mapmaking
- Neogeography – Amateur-focused geography
- Planetary science – Science of planets and planetary systems
- Political ecology – Study of political, economic and social factors about environmental issues
