= Marion Newbigin =

Scottish geographer and biologist

Marion Isabel Newbigin
- Born: 1869; Alnwick, Northumberland, England
- Died: 20 July 1934 (aged 64–65); Edinburgh, Scotland
- Education: Edinburgh Association for the University Education of Women; University College, Aberystwyth
- Alma mater: Edinburgh School of Medicine for Women; University of London
- Known for: editor of Scottish Geographical Magazine
- Scientific career
- Fields: zoogeography

Marion Isabel Newbigin (1869 – 20 July 1934) was a Scottish geographer, biologist and academic author. She was noted for her book Animal Geography, a key work in the field of animal geography/zoogeography, and as editor of the Scottish Geographical Magazine.

== Early life and education ==
Newbigin was born at Alnwick, Northumberland the daughter of local pharmacist James Lesslie Newbigin. She had four sisters and three brothers. She and all of her sisters were ardent feminists, and two of them also had academic careers. Universities in Scotland did not admit women, so she took courses at the Edinburgh Association for the University Education of Women, a private organisation that offered lectures by the faculty of the University of Edinburgh; at University College, Aberystwyth, in Wales; and at the Edinburgh School of Medicine for Women, once it was formed. Finally, she moved to the University of London, where in 1893 she received a BSc, and in 1898 a PhD. While a student in Edinburgh she started to work as an assistant for zoologist J. Arthur Thomson, then a lecturer at the School of Medicine for Women, who was a great influence on her.

== Scientific career ==
While a student in London, Newbigin began conducting research, based at the laboratories of the Royal College of Physicians. Her research was wide ranging and included the colouration of plants and animals, especially marine species. Her findings were published in journal articles, which she authored individually or with collaborators, most notably N.D. Paton. Later she studied and reported on the large collections of marine organisms collected by the Challenger expedition, and undertook further research, expanding her natural history knowledge at the Marine Biological Station Millport. She brought her work and the published literature on marine organisms' colouration together in Colour in Nature (1898) and Life by the Sea Shore (1901), which were praised as both scientifically rigorous and remarkably accessible. These early works of hers remained widely read for many years after their publication.

After completing her degrees in London, Newbigin returned to Edinburgh, where she took up her mentor Thomson's position as lecturer of biology and zoology at the School of Medicine for Women. She was highly regarded by her students and those who saw her public lectures. She continued to lecture at various institutions, and later in her life devoted much of her time to writing geography textbooks.

In 1902, she was employed as editor of the Scottish Geographical Magazine and held the position for 32 years until her death in 1934. During her time as editor she helped shape geography as a new and developing academic discipline of geography. She used her platform amply write popular articles on various aspects of geography. As editor, and in various institutional roles, she mentored and encouraged an entire generation of British geographers. She contributed numerous academic works, and unusually even for her time, her geographical interests were wide-ranging, covering essentially every subfield of geography. Her most prominent work was Animal Geography (1913) and others on animal geographies and other areas at the intersection of biology and geography. However she also wrote about political geography (e.g. Aftermath, 1920, an acclaimed work on the aftermath of World War I), travel (Frequented Ways, 1922), and cartography (Ordnance Survey Maps, 1913), among other topics. Among the recognition she received was the Livingstone Gold Medal of the Royal Scottish Geographical Society, the Back Award of the Royal Geographical Society (1921) and the presidency of the geographical section of the British Association.

== Later life ==
At Chamberlain Road, Edinburgh she lived for many years with her sisters Hilda and Alice, as well as Maude once the latter retired. It was there that she died on 20 July 1934.

== Selected bibliography ==
Among the published works of Marion Newbigin are:

- Newbigin, Marion L. (1898). Colour in Nature, a Study in Biology. London: John Murray. OCLC 1594265 (all editions).
- Introduction to physical geography (1912)
- An elementary geography of Scotland (1913). Oxford : The Clarendon Press
- Animal geography: the faunas of the natural regions of the globe (1913). Oxford : The Clarendon Press.
- Ordnance survey maps : their meaning and use; with descriptions of typical sheets (1913). Edinburgh: W. & A.K. Johnston.
- Geographical Aspects of Balkan problems in their relation to the great European war (1915). Oxford : The Clarendon Press.
- Aftermath (1920)
