= Tokyo Junshin University =

Japan private women's college

Coordinates: 35°41′36.3″N 139°20′5.6″E

Tokyo Junshin Women's College (東京純心女子大学, Tōkyō junshin joshi daigaku) is a private women's college in Hachiōji, Tokyo, Japan.

== History ==
The predecessor of the school was founded in 1934, and it was chartered as a junior college in 1967. In 1996 it became a four-year college.

The name was changed in 2015 to Tokyo Junshin University (東京純心大学, Tōkyō junshin daigaku), and it became a mixed-gender Catholic university.

Since 2015, both men and women can major in children's culture or nursing.

== Courses ==
There are courses available allowing students who major in children's culture to become qualified as National Certified Childcare Workers to obtain a Teaching Licenses for kindergarten and elementary schools in Japan.

Students who major in nursing can earn the right to take the examinations to become a National Certified Nurse in Japan.
