= Kurt James Gray =

Social psychologist

Kurt Gray
- Education: University of Waterloo (BSc); Harvard University (PhD)
- Known for: Mind perception; Moral typecasting; Theory of dyadic morality
- Notable work: The Mind Club (2016); Outraged (2025)
- Awards: SPSP Theoretical Innovation Prize (2013); APS Janet Taylor Spence Award (2014); SESP Career Trajectory Award (2025)
- Scientific career
- Fields: Social psychology; Moral psychology
- Workplaces: Ohio State University; University of North Carolina at Chapel Hill; University of Maryland, College Park
- Doctoral advisor: Daniel Wegner
- Website: kurtjgray.com

Kurt Gray is a social psychologist whose research concerns mind perception, moral judgment, and political polarization. He holds the Weary Foundation Endowed Chair in Social Psychology at Ohio State University. With Chelsea Schein, he developed the theory of dyadic morality, which emphasizes perceived harm in moral judgment. He received the Association for Psychological Science's Janet Taylor Spence Award in 2014.

Gray's early work with Heather M. Gray and Daniel Wegner proposed that people perceive minds along two dimensions: agency, the capacity to plan and act, and experience, the capacity to feel. With Wegner he co-wrote The Mind Club (2016), a book for general readers on how people perceive minds. His 2025 book Outraged applies the harm-based account to political conflict. A New Scientist reviewer called it "clear and insightful", while Elizabeth Kolbert, in The New Yorker, questioned its proposed remedy of harm-based storytelling.

== Early life and education ==
Gray studied geophysics in college before turning to psychology. He received an honours BSc from the University of Waterloo in 2003, in psychology with a minor in earth sciences. He then completed a PhD at Harvard University in 2010, with Wegner as his advisor.

== Career ==
Gray was an assistant professor of psychology at the University of Maryland, College Park from 2010 to 2012, and in July 2012 joined the social psychology program at the University of North Carolina at Chapel Hill as an assistant professor. He later became a professor of psychology and neuroscience at UNC, where he directed the Deepest Beliefs Lab and the Center for the Science of Moral Understanding, which he founded in 2019.

Gray joined Ohio State in autumn 2025 as the inaugural Weary Foundation Endowed Chair in Social Psychology and faculty director of the Collaborative on the Science of Polarization and Misinformation (C-SPAM), positions funded by a gift from Gifford Weary.

== Research ==
=== Mind perception ===
With Heather M. Gray and Wegner, Gray reported in Science in 2007 that people perceive minds along two dimensions: agency (such as self-control and planning) and experience (the capacity to feel sensations such as hunger, fear, and pain). Respondents rated an infant as high in experience but low in agency, and God as high in agency but low in experience. In a 2017 PNAS paper, Kara Weisman, Carol S. Dweck, and Ellen M. Markman called this "pioneering work", but argued that it captured how people distinguish between kinds of beings rather than how they divide up mental life; their own studies found three components, relating to the body, the heart, and the mind.

Gray and Wegner later proposed that humanlike robots seem unsettling when people attribute to them experience, the capacity to feel and sense. In a 2012 article in Psychological Inquiry, published with responses from other researchers, Gray, Liane Young, and Adam Waytz argued that moral judgment rests on a template of two perceived minds: an intentional agent and a suffering patient. In a commentary in the same issue, Andrew E. Monroe, Steve Guglielmo, and Bertram F. Malle argued that intentionality, harm, and suffering are not necessary for moral judgment, and that mind perception is only one of several processes involved.

=== Moral typecasting and dyadic morality ===
Gray and Wegner described moral typecasting as a tendency to see people who perform good or evil acts as less vulnerable to receiving them, and recipients as less capable of performing them.

The theory of dyadic morality holds that acts are condemned in proportion to how far they break norms, how much negative emotion they provoke, and how harmful they seem, with harm understood as an intentional agent causing damage to a vulnerable patient. In a 2014 paper, Gray, Schein, and Adrian F. Ward reported that people perceive victims even in ostensibly harmless wrongs. The theory is presented as an alternative to moral foundations theory, which treats care, fairness, loyalty, authority, and sanctity as partly independent foundations.

Other researchers have disputed the theory. In a 2015 comment, Jesse Graham argued that Gray and Jonathan Keeney had not shown that severity and typicality account for the differences between judgments of harm and impurity. Edward B. Royzman and Samuel H. Borislow, who described the dyadic account as "one prominent view" of the link between harm and wrongdoing, reported "wrongless harms": behavior that people judged intended, self-serving, and foreseeably harmful, yet not immoral.

Gray has applied the theory to political disagreement. In a 2025 Annual Review of Psychology article, he and Samuel Pratt argued that moral judgments share a focus on perceived harm and that different perceptions of harm help drive political disagreements. In twelve studies published in 2026, Jake Womick, Emily Kubin, Gray, and colleagues reported that liberals and conservatives disagree about who is especially vulnerable to victimization, and that these assumptions explained the link between ideology and moral judgment, usually better than moral foundations.

=== Polarization ===
In a 2021 study, Gray and colleagues reported that people showed greater respect for political opponents who supported their views with personal experiences of harm than for opponents who presented facts. The authors attributed this effect to increased perceptions that the opponents were rational. He co-authored a 2022 Nature Human Behaviour review that grouped interventions to reduce partisan animosity into those targeting thoughts, relationships, and institutions.

=== Robots and artificial intelligence ===
With Yochanan Bigman, Gray reported in nine studies that people are averse to machines making moral decisions. The authors linked this aversion to perceptions that machines cannot fully think or feel. In studies of gender discrimination in hiring, Bigman, Gray, and colleagues found less moral outrage when discrimination was attributed to an algorithm than to a person, which they linked to people ascribing less prejudiced motivation to algorithms.

=== Religion ===
Gray and colleagues studied how a representative sample of American Christians visualize God's face; liberals saw God as more feminine, more African American, and more loving than conservatives did. Other work with Michele Gelfand linked culturally "tight" societies, which have strict norms and punishment, to belief in punitive gods.

== Books and reception ==
Gray co-wrote The Mind Club (2016) with Wegner and co-edited the Atlas of Moral Psychology (2018) with Jesse Graham. His 2025 book Outraged was reviewed in several outlets. In The New Yorker, Kolbert summarized its argument that perceived harm underlies moral judgment, but questioned whether harm-based storytelling could bridge political divides, noting that victimhood narratives can also spread falsehoods. In New Scientist, Chen Ly called the book "clear and insightful", while suggesting that some of its observations might seem familiar.

- Wegner, Daniel M.; Gray, Kurt (2016). The Mind Club: Who Thinks, What Feels, and Why It Matters. New York: Viking. ISBN 978-0-670-78583-4.
- Gray, Kurt; Graham, Jesse, eds. (2018). Atlas of Moral Psychology. New York: Guilford Press. ISBN 978-1-4625-3256-8.
- Gray, Kurt (2025). Outraged: Why We Fight About Morality and Politics and How to Find Common Ground. New York: Pantheon Books. ISBN 978-0-593-31743-3.

== Awards ==
Gray, Young, and Waytz shared the Society for Personality and Social Psychology's 2013 Theoretical Innovation Prize for their 2012 article "Mind Perception Is the Essence of Morality". He received the APS Janet Taylor Spence Award in 2014, was named an SPSP fellow in 2023, and received the Society of Experimental Social Psychology's Career Trajectory Award in 2025.

== Personal life ==
Gray is married to the psychologist Kristen Lindquist, who joined Ohio State with him in 2025 as the Robert K. and Dale J. Weary Chair in Social Psychology.

== Selected publications ==
- Gray, Heather M.; Gray, Kurt; Wegner, Daniel M. (2007). "Dimensions of Mind Perception". Science. 315 (5812): 619. doi:10.1126/science.1134475. PMID 17272713.
- Gray, Kurt; Wegner, Daniel M. (2009). "Moral typecasting: Divergent perceptions of moral agents and moral patients". Journal of Personality and Social Psychology. 96 (3): 505–520. doi:10.1037/a0013748. PMID 19254100.
- Gray, Kurt; Young, Liane; Waytz, Adam (2012). "Mind Perception Is the Essence of Morality". Psychological Inquiry. 23 (2): 101–124. doi:10.1080/1047840X.2012.651387. PMC 3379786. PMID 22754268.
- Schein, Chelsea; Gray, Kurt (2018). "The Theory of Dyadic Morality: Reinventing Moral Judgment by Redefining Harm". Personality and Social Psychology Review. 22 (1): 32–70. doi:10.1177/1088868317698288. PMID 28504021.
- Kubin, Emily; Puryear, Curtis; Schein, Chelsea; Gray, Kurt (2021). "Personal experiences bridge moral and political divides better than facts". Proceedings of the National Academy of Sciences. 118 (6) e2008389118. doi:10.1073/pnas.2008389118. PMC 8017692. PMID 33495361.
- Womick, Jake; Kubin, Emily; Goya-Tocchetto, Daniela; et al. (2026). "Liberals and Conservatives See Different Victims: Moral Disagreement Is Explained by Different Assumptions of Vulnerability". Personality and Social Psychology Bulletin. doi:10.1177/01461672261422957. PMID 41814650.

== See also ==
- Moral foundations theory
- Social intuitionism
- Theory of mind
- Political polarization
