= Berry Mayall =

British academic and sociologist (c.1936–2021)

- Born: c. 1936; Leicester, England
- Died: 25 October 2021
- Education: Newnham College, Cambridge
- Occupation(s): Academic, sociologist
- Known for: Childhood studies, children's rights advocacy

Berry Mayall (c. 1936–2021) was a British academic and sociologist.

Mayall was born in Leicester. In 1958, she graduated in English from Newnham College in the University of Cambridge.

She worked at the Institute of Education (now part of the University College London) as a childhood studies academic researcher and set up the Sociology of Childhood and Children's Rights masters' degree at the university. She argued that modern Western societies often marginalised input from children and adolescents, and saw children as oppressed within society. She also noted the connections between the children's rights movement and the early 20th-century feminist movement, especially in the latter's aims to improve the health and education of primary school-aged children.

She died of cancer on 25 October 2021, aged 85.

== See also ==
- Sociology of the family
