= Emotional geography =

Subtopic within human cultural geography

Emotional geography is a subtopic within human geography, more specifically cultural geography, which applies psychological theories of emotion. It is an interdisciplinary field relating emotions, geographic places and their contextual environments. These subjective feelings can be applied to individual and social contexts. Emotional geography specifically focuses on how human emotions relate to, or affect, the environment around them.

Firstly, there is a difference between emotional and affectual geography and they have their respective geographical sub-fields. The former refers to theories of expressed feelings and the social constructs of expressed feelings which can be generalisable and understood globally. The latter refers to theories underlying inexpressible feelings that are independent, embodied, and hard to understand.

Emotional geography approaches geographical concepts and research from an expressed and generalisable perspective. Historically, emotions have an ultimate adaptive significance by accentuating a non-verbal form of communication that is universal. This dates back to Darwin's theory of emotion, which explains the evolutionary development of expressed emotion. This aids individual and societal relationships as there is the presence of emotional communication. For example, when studying social phenomena, individuals' emotions can connect and create a social emotion which can define the event happening.

So, emotional geography applies emotional theory to places, emphasising the individual and social presence of it.

== History ==
Emotions in geography have previously been ignored and classified as unimportant, leading to misconceptions and methodological issues. So, this appearance of emotions in geography is part of the cultural turn. Previously emotions were not accounted for due to historical reasons which include: the analytic mindset refusing to express emotion (from the Enlightenment), sexist connotations of emotions, cultural taboos of emotion and the idea of the objective researcher who does not account for emotions in their research.

As individuals express a constant circulation of emotion, researchers also encompass these subjective emotional fluxes which extend beyond the individual and influence the research, both intentionally and unintentionally. This emotional awareness changed geographical research methodology, as accounting for the integration of the researcher has induced interconnectivity. This can be especially important when trying to understand the feelings of the 'other' as situational and personal awareness is required from the researcher to achieve a rational perspective. By including emotion in research, it has induced research reflexivity and provoked a paradigm shift, aiding the reputation of geography as a social science.

== Individuals ==
The complex lives of individuals lead them to constantly have an emotional perspective. So, feeling emotions is humanely omnipresent and is another type of knowledge. Emotions are internal but influenced by varying external conditions. Emotional geography studies how these emotions are varying fluxes in an individual which are then flowing between the individuals and between their environments. This leads to people identifying with certain places, such as through a sense of place and topophilia, which in turn influences the perception of a place based on an individual's emotion. However, due to the subjective nature of emotions, everyone's perception of a location is completely different.

== Society ==
Emotional geography has implications for societal emotions which lead to social and cultural geographical concepts that are related to emotions. Contemporarily, emotions are integrated into society, which differs from its historical restriction to the private life, thus allowing relationships between people and their locations.

Consequently, personal emotions express themselves in the social realm which is influenced by the space and the framing of the place. This is present when people share and experience a collective emotion or even recreate it. These collective emotions, such as heightened emotions during social events, can also lead to dominant norms, allowing the possibility of systemic change. Collective emotions have been studied through social inequality including racism, sexism and the societal discrimination of other marginalised societies, which could lead to institutional change. However, there is a diversity of cross-cultural emotional expression and interpretation which should be accounted for in policy change.

== Limitations ==
The limitations of emotional geography are the following:

- ignorance of affect, leading to misunderstood feelings as only expressed emotions are accounted for,
- generalisation of expressed emotion, which includes reducing emotions to the six basic ones,
- lack of distinction between thought and emotion, consequently leaving out their relationship,
- subjective nature of emotions, whereby the researcher may incorrectly alter the research.

This shows a potential lack of inadequacy and incapability of real world applications. To overcome these limitations, emotional geographers could reflect on the basis of their field and avoid presuming emotions while simultaneously accounting for thoughts, affects, etc...

== Examples ==
Real world-applications of this field are numerous and include studies demonstrating:

- emotional geographies of healthcare,
- childcare through the emotional geography of mothers,
- emotional engagements with an LGBTQ monument,
- the understanding of a place through the emotional geography of oppressed people, such as women of colour,
- emotional geographies of a classroom and the relationships between students, parents and teachers,
- situational emotional geographies, i.e. elderly incarcerated people, which highlights the Shoelace model of Emotional Geography,
- the potential increase of emotional connections to cities by increasing public spaces,
- the possibility of environmental implications to promote an emotional connection and sense of place to nature,
- the prospect of global application as emotions are amplified during social marginalisation, economic crises and health and natural catastrophes.

There is a wide range of literature addressing emotional geography which extends beyond this list and findings may be applied socio-culturally, morally, professionally, physically, and politically.

== Communities ==
The leading community for emotional geography is an organisation known as EMME (Eliciting, Mapping and Managing Emotions). It has its home in the Festival of Emotions which can be found at: www.emotional-geography.com. It consists of 84 Geographers of Emotions, citizens of the world with no borders or agenda, who come together to share their knowledge and experience with others through courses, journeys, games and community events. Furthermore, there is a schollarly journal, Emotion, Space and Society (ISSN 1878-0040), which specialises in the relationship between emotion and geography and aims to increase awareness by hosting conferences and publishing journals.

== See also ==
- Cultural geography
- Environment (biophysical)
- Natural environment
- Physical environments
- Social environment
