= Kristen Lindquist =

Psychologist and affective neuroscientist

- Occupation: Full Professor
- Title: Robert K. and Dale J. Weary Chair in Social Psychology
- Awards: Association for Psychological Science Rising Star Award (2013)

Academic background
- Education: Boston College
- Thesis: The brain basis of emotion: A meta-analytic review
- Doctoral advisor: Lisa Feldman Barrett

Academic work
- Discipline: Psychologist, Neuroscientist
- Sub-discipline: Social Psychologist, Affective Cognitive Neuroscientist
- Institutions: The Ohio State University
- Main interests: Emotion, Emotion Perception, Emotional Development
- Website: http://www.kristenalindquist.com

Kristen A. Lindquist, Ph.D., is a social psychologist and affective neuroscientist whose research focuses on the psychological and neural mechanisms of emotional experiences and perceptions, and how these mechanisms relate to cultural and developmental factors, including language and conceptual development. She is known for her research on the brain basis of emotion which suggests that the instantiation of perceiving or experiencing emotions such as fear relies on several regions across the brain, and that no single neural region preferentially activates for a particular emotion. Lindquist is also known for her research on emotion words, suggesting that when speakers of different languages discuss emotions like love, they likely convey different meanings between the speaker and the listener. Her findings run counter to the view that a certain set of so-called basic emotions are universal, experienced uniformly across the world.

Lindquist is the incoming Robert K. and Dale J. Weary Chair in Social Psychology at The Ohio State University. Prior to that, she was Professor of Psychology and Neuroscience and Director of the Affective Science Lab at The University of North Carolina at Chapel Hill.

Lindquist received the Rising Star Award from the Association for Psychological Science in 2013 and is a Fellow of the Society of Experimental Social Psychology.

== Biography ==
Lindquist received a B.A. in Psychology and English from Boston College in 2004, and her Ph.D. in Psychology from Boston College in 2010, where she was a student of Lisa Feldman Barrett. Lindquist was a postdoctoral fellow at the Harvard University Mind/Brain/Behavior Initiative and the Martinos Center for Biomedical Imaging at Massachusetts General Hospital, where she worked with Bradford Dickerson.

After completing her Ph.D, Lindquist joined the faculty of the Department of Psychology and Neuroscience at the University of North Carolina, Chapel Hill where she is a member of the Social Psychology Program and the Human Neuroimaging Group. She received the UNC Office of the Provost Johnston Excellence in Teaching Award in 2016. Lindquist serves as Associate Editor of the Journal of Experimental Psychology: General. She is one of the co-founders of the Emotion News blog.

== Research ==
Lindquist studies emotions and affective neuroscience. She believes that in order to understand how emotions impact decision making and interpersonal communication, and how they go awry, psychological and neural mechanisms must be understood. Her research has demonstrated how body changes, emotional concepts, and attention form emotional experiences and perceptions, which then map on to distributed brain networks.

Using the tools of social cognition, physiology and neuroscience, Lindquist works to understand how people experience emotions in their bodies and how they see emotions in others. Among her studies, Lindquist found how words play a crucial part in forming recognizable emotions from experiences; that the brain categorizes information using language and groups abstract feelings into coherent categories. Through analysis of emotion words in 2,474 languages, Lindquist and her colleagues found that word meanings can vary widely across cultures. Using the phenomenon of colexification, which is when a word names two or more concepts, they found that "emotions cluster differently in different languages."

== Representative publications ==
- Lindquist, K. A., & Barrett, L. F. (2008). Emotional complexity. In M. Lewis, J. M. Haviland-Jones, & L. F. Barrett (Eds.), Handbook of emotions (p. 513–530). The Guilford Press.
- Lindquist, K. A., & Barrett, L. F. (2012). A functional architecture of the human brain: emerging insights from the science of emotion. Trends in Cognitive Sciences, 16(11), 533-540.
- Lindquist, K. A., Barrett, L. F., Bliss-Moreau, E., & Russell, J. A. (2006). Language and the perception of emotion. Emotion, 6(1), 125.
- Lindquist, K. A., & Gendron, M. (2013). What's in a word? Language constructs emotion perception. Emotion Review, 5(1), 66-71.
- Lindquist, K. A., Wager, T. D., Kober, H., Bliss-Moreau, E., & Barrett, L. F. (2012). The brain basis of emotion: a meta-analytic review. Behavioral and Brain Sciences, 35(3), 121-143.
