= Otherness of childhood =

The otherness of childhood describes the substantial differences between children's and adults' lived worlds, and the otherness of the former from the latter's perspective. These differences are suggested to emerge from complex outcomes of divergent states of physical, neurological, emotional, affective and experiential being between children's and adults' lives. This is of interest to children's geographies, as children's experiences and practices of, say, a city, and its spaces might be very different from those of adults, and very difficult to recreate through adult sensibilities, with implications for research.

The approach suggests that adult researchers need to be cautious in their claims about understanding the world from a child's perspective. It is not claimed that there are no connections between these two worlds, but rather that they can be at once very connected and close and very far apart. This is a common theme in some literature which considers childhood. Ideas of the otherness of childhood have connections with some children's affinity with disordered spaces (those not managed and tidied by adult society) like waste ground in cities. They also have implications for trying to remember what it was like to be a child as a form of research and knowing childhood. This is, at best, a highly complex and multifaceted process which, again, cannot be assumed to give easy access to children's worlds. This issue has raised some critical response within children's geographies.

== See also ==
- Childhood studies

== Bibliography ==
- Cloke, P.; Jones, O. (2005). "Unclaimed Territory: Childhood and Disordered Spaces(s)". Social and Cultural Geography. 6 (3): 311–323. doi:10.1080/14649360500111154. S2CID 143112325.
- Philo, C. (2003). "To Go Back up the Side Hill: Memories, Imaginations and Reveries of Childhood". Geographies of Childhood. 1 (1): 7–23. doi:10.1080/14733280302188. S2CID 145501646.
