= Ronald Bordessa =

Canadian academic administrator

Ronald Bordessa is the current President Emeritus of the University of Ontario Institute of Technology, having served as its President and Vice Chancellor from 2006 to 2011, when on July 1 he was succeeded by Tim McTiernan.

Bordessa was born in Wales and educated at the University of Wales at Swansea and Liverpool University.

A geographer and academic of over 30 years, Bordessa was provost at Royal Roads University in British Columbia and was former dean of York University's Atkinson Faculty of Liberal & Professional Studies before his appointment at the UOIT.

In 1975 with William Bunge Bordessa co-wrote the book The Canadian Alternative: Survival, Expeditions and Urban Change, which contains a chapter entitled "Machineism versus Lifeism" in which they wrote that "Lifeism, which places man-kind's survival as central..." must defeat its opposite, Machineism, the open-ended worship of machines.

Bordessa is a visiting professor of Geography at the University of Western Australia in Perth, Australia and serves the same role at Helsinki University in Finland, and at the University of Joensuu in Finland.

He is married to Mari Peepre, a former academic director at Royal Roads University.

Preceded by Gary Polonsky	President and Vice-Chancellor of the University of Ontario Institute of Technology; 2006-2011	Succeeded by Tim McTiernan
