= Children's culture =

Children's relation to broader culture

Children's culture includes children's cultural artifacts, children's media and literature, and the myths and discourses spun around the notion of childhood. Children's culture has been studied within academia in cultural studies, media studies, and literature departments. The interdisciplinary focus of childhood studies could also be considered in the paradigm of social theory concerning the study of children's culture.

== Children's cultural studies ==
In recent years, cultural studies scholars from various fields of study have deconstructed and assessed sociological issues specifically dealing with children's roles within a society's culture. The phrase "children's culture" was made most popular by a body of works known as The Children's Culture Reader. The collection, edited by MIT's Henry Jenkins, features various scholars discussing cultural themes about childhood and what it means to be a child. Jenkins describes the collection as being "about how our culture defines what it means to be a child, how adult institutions impact children’s lives, and how children construct their cultural and social identities". These scholars view children as “active participants” that possess social and political "agency," American historian Steven Mintz echoes that critics of children's culture focus on commercialization, commodification, and colonization of children

More recently, media studies scholars such as Rebecca Hains, Sharon Mazzarella, and Nancy Jennings have called for cultural studies approaches to exploring how children's consumer culture, media, and toy marketing are interrelated. They have published edited collections such as The Marketing of Children's Toys: Critical Perspectives on Children's Consumer Culture and Cultural Studies of LEGO: More Than Just Bricks to fill these gaps in the literature.

=== Socialization of children ===
Consumer socialization and consumerism are concerned with the stages by which young people develop consumer related skills, knowledge, and attitudes. In a retrospective study, written by University of Minnesota's Carlson School of Management Chair of Marketing, Deborah Roedder John looks at 25 years of research and focuses her discussion on, "children's knowledge of products, brands, advertising, shopping, pricing, decision-making strategies, parental influence strategies, and consumption motives and values". The model proposed for the development of consumer behavior is framed through the use of age-related patterns. Using characteristics of knowledge and reasoning and developmental mechanisms, cognitive and social stages are defined by way of Piaget's theory of cognitive development which describes developmental stages that are mastered as children obtain the ability to cognitively interpret mediated messages. She expands pulling from Information processing theories explaining the storing and retrieval of information. John references Robert L. Selmen, a Professor of Education, Human Development, and Psychology in Medicine at Harvard University discussing the development of social perspectives in young children.

== Children's media studies ==
Children's studies relating to the media use and consumption, access and literacy, content and exposure are all themes found within the body of research concerning the habits of young people. Because of the rapidly evolving media environment researchers from various academic fields are seeking to understand beyond consumption, looking more at the depths of new media technologies that allow for mobility and differing capacities to communicate and interact. In today's society young people have been reported to use five to seven to even seven and a half hours per day on average using media. Specifically entertainment medias including: television and bedroom TVs, cable/satellite, movies, music, computer, the Internet, video games (via online, CD-ROM, or gaming console), mobile/cellular phones, advertising, and print forms In today's society young people have been reported to use five. Other scholars, Wartella, Huston, Rideout, and Robb (2009), also call for more research specifically examining variances in content to assess quality versus quantity of consumption across media formats.

=== Media literacy ===
A research review done on behalf of Ofcom, an independent regulator in the U.K. communications industry, scholars from the Centre for the Study of Children, Youth and Media Institute of Education, University of London researchers reviewed literature relating to children's media literacy focusing on the media formats of television, radio, internet, and the mobile telephone. The study also addressed various barriers to and enablers of usage and access, understanding, and creativity. Ofcom defines media literacy as "the skills and competencies needed to gain access to media content by using available technologies and associated software".

Media literacy encompasses concepts like 'net-literacy' and children being screen-wise versus book-wise, with scholars such as Renee Hobbs, a professor at the University of Rhode Island, advocating for increased attention to strategies for digital and media literacy. For example, Sonia Livingstone, a professor of Social Psychology and head of the Department of Media and Communications at London School of Economics, and her collaborator have long argued that screen formats are becoming increasingly critical to education, work and leisure and even forms of interaction and engagement. These scholars point to the importance of media and computer education, citing it as "essential for the acquisition of the necessary skills". The authors go on to say that at schools children need to be taught how to:

- "operate the technology so as to integrate the computer into their working and leisure lives,"
- "handle processes of information search and information management, including the potential information overload,"
- "critically appraise and assess the relative value of information from different sources,"
- "gain competencies in understanding the construction, forms, strengths and limitations of screen-based contents, including the development of their own screen-related creative skills."

==== Access and usage ====
In addressing various barriers to and enablers of media usage, access, understanding, and creative initiative all play their roles in media literacy. In order to access media there must be physical access and then the ability to manipulate the media. An emerging concept within the discussion of access and usage is the digital divide. The digital divide is the notion that people with less access have less opportunities to develop skills (p. 33). Roberts and Feohr (2008), refer to the term as, "variations in access (in homes, schools, or other public locations) to personal computers and allied technologies, such as Internet connections, according to differences in socioeconomic status, race and ethnicity, gender, and geography (rural and urban location)". Despite the proliferation of new media for personal use, those children that reported they used the internet on a typical day at their schools has remained consistent at 19% in 2004 and 20% in 2009. Diversifying media landscapes have expanded the options young people have to consume. The Kaiser Family Foundation study that spans 10 years (1999-2009) highlights several areas in which media access has branched into new platforms including: the increase of high-speed home Internet access, the crossing over of television content available online, and the expansion of new applications such as social networking and YouTube. The same Kaiser study from 2010 highlights computer and internet access of children based on ethnicity and level of parents' education. 94% of white children have computer access and 88% have internet access, compared to Hispanics' 92% computer and 74% internet, and Blacks’ 89% computer and 78% internet access. When looking at levels of parents' education, of those that had a high school education or less 87% had computer access and 74% had internet access, 94% of those that had some college had computer access and 84% had internet, versus the 97% computer and 91% internet access to those children whose parents had a college education (p. 23).

=== Entertainment media ===
Common Sense Media conducted a 2012 study that specifically examined what they defined as children's entertainment media, which consisted of "TV shows, music, video games, texting, iPods, cell phone games, social networking sites, apps, computer programs, online videos, and websites used for fun". In a similar study in 2010, the Kaiser researchers defined recreational media as, "non-school related media use" (p. 6). Bee and Boyd (2010) specifies entertainment media only as: television, movies, MP3 players, video games, and computers. While interest in areas of newer forms of entertainment media are expanding, television still has the most predominant effects. Easily accessible at home, TV's incorporation of sound and digital images make for an entertaining medium that has both informational and social values that other new media have not yet tapped. From an interpersonal communication standpoint, Stanford scholars discussing media multitasking versus face-to-face multitasking observed girl's media use across several similar platforms including: video and video games, listening to music, e-mailing and posting on social network sites, texting and instant messaging, talking on phones, and video chatting. According to Livingston and Bovill of the London School of Economics and Political Science, almost all (99%) of 6-17 year olds watch television in their leisure time, over four in every five watch videos (81%), two-thirds play computer games (64%), almost nine in ten (86%) listen to music (often while doing something else), just over half (57%) read books that are not for school, a third (36%) use a personal computer (PC) not for games in their leisure time, and one in five (19%) personally use the Internet somewhere (mostly in school).

=== New media technology ===
The longitudinal study from Kaiser saw a drop in usage of the more traditional form of regularly scheduled broadcast TV by almost half an hour from 3 hours and 4 minutes to 2 hours and 39minutes; however, that statistic alone can be deceiving because the consumption of TV content has actually increased daily TV consumption by 38 minutes. Newer forms of media have allowed children to consume television in several ways. Now 8-to 18-year-olds are watching an average of 24 minutes a day of TV/movies on the Internet, 15 minutes watching on cell phones, about 16 minutes watching on iPods. Time-shifting technologies (On Demand, TiVo, DVR/VCR) are also changing how children watch TV. While 59% watch TV traditionally, 41% of consumption is now time-shifted or occurs on a platform other that a TV set. In terms of ownership of these new media technologies, from 2004 to 2009 cell phone ownership has increased from 39% to 66% and iPods and MP3 players saw the most significant increases of 18% to 76% ownership.

=== Era of media and technology ===
"The choices that our children are making—when and how they engage with these media and in what situations—are shaping their social relationships, social well-being, and time availabilities for school-related study and other activities." Children are increasing their consumption of media and their media multitasking. Media is recognized as central in childhood socialization, yet because scholars continue to recognize face-to-face communication with peers and adults as key determinant of social and emotional development, some feel it is imperative to understand how the progressing digital climate is being utilized by and thus influencing youth. In 2010, Rideout, Foehr, and Roberts found substantial differences in children that are heavy compared to light media users in numerous socioemotional areas of life. These scholars reported that heavy users are 10% more likely to feel sad or unhappy; 12% more likely to report feelings of boredom. As a part of the National Survey of Children's Health, researchers found that each additional hour of television viewing was associated with greater odds of overweight/obesity, poorer oral health, social-emotional problems, concern about self-esteem, and lower social competence; more time spent on the computer, meanwhile, was only associated with overweight/obesity.

Electronic and digital media especially are increasingly being studied for their influential role in community, cultural, and societal shaping. Calvert and Wilson (2008), describe experiences with screen media as normative for children in western societies, so much that authors point out a phenomenon called media multitasking. Reports of spreading attention across platforms indicated that some 68% of seventh through twelfth graders reported media multitasking while watching TV either 'some of the time' (29%) or 'most of the time' (39%).

In a study from scholars at Stanford Graduate School of Education, Professor of Learning Sciences and Education, Roy Pea and his team conducted an online survey of 3,461 girls ages 8–12 to study relationships between the young girls’ social well-being, media use, and face-to-face communication. According to the Stanford researchers, levels of media use that center around interpersonal interaction (e.g., phone, online communication) were found to be positively associated with negative social well-being. A negatively associated relationship between face-to-face communication and media multitasking was found. In the study, media multitasking was associated with negative social indicators and face-to-face communication was strongly associated with positive social well-being. In particular, video usage was strongly associated with negative social well-being. Of the girls surveyed, the media formats of music, talking on the phone, and online communication were found to be positively related to media multitasking, and even greater levels of media multitasking were seen with cell phone ownership and having TV in the bedroom. With that, the scholars also linked the two to less sleep. While the research indicated that face-to-face communication was positively related to hours of sleep, they found media multitasking, video use, and online communication to be negatively related to hours of sleep.

The rapidly fluctuating media ecologies now more than ever are changing the very interactions that form social developments. According to Kinder (1999), children's reactions to media and its transforming culture are more "active, variable, and negotiated" than perhaps scholars realize, because often the responses are rooted in the context of play and other leisure activities. Increasingly, studies are focusing on the ways in which youth spend their time. For many scholars context and content set the parameters for health and wellness in the lives of children. High mediated-saturation levels can lead to the development of certain outlooks and perspectives.

There is research now from large national organizations studying media effects specially those of children and adolescents. Foundations like the Kaiser Family Foundation have conducted longitudinal studies relating the media habits of children and adolescents. Through the years nationwide, over 2,000 youth, ages 8 to 18, have participated to track changes through developing stages of childhood and adolescents. Data collected with children's self-reports of a typical day measured: which media are being used, how much time is spent with each, how new media platforms are changing consumption, the role are mobile and online media playing, the use of computers and the Internet. Authors also investigated the media environment of young people, as well as usage patterns over the years and across different age groups. Gender differences and ethnicity were also studied. In 2010, Strasburger, Jordan, and Donnerstein discussed the effects of media on health and well-being. While studies have shown that media can be positive for development and provide information about safe healthy practices that can foster social connectedness, some scholars continue to express concerns regarding potential negative effects of media's outcomes such as: aggression, sexual behavior, substance use, disordered eating, and academic difficulties. Other scholars have contended, however, that these fears are unfounded or at least exaggerated, noting that it was difficult to separate careful science from moral crusading.

According to a 2000 media study done by Livingston and Bovill of the London School of Economics and Political Science, almost all (99%) of 6-17 year olds watch television in their leisure time, over four in every five watch videos (81%), two-thirds play computer games (64%), almost nine in ten (86%) listen to music (often while doing something else), just over half (57%) read books that are not for school, a third (36%) use a personal computer (PC) not for games in their leisure time, and one in five (19%) personally use the Internet somewhere (mostly in school).

Common Sense Media, a non-partisan, nonprofit organization that provides information and resources for families to research and network about media, conducted a study which sought the perspectives from teachers regarding media effects recognizable in children. 71% of teachers ('a lot': 34% and 'somewhat': 37%) noted effects to attention spans, six out of ten (58%) teachers noted a decline in writing skills, and 59% in face-to-face communication. Neglect of homework and class preparedness and a decline in critical thinking skills were also noted. According to the study, amongst elementary school students the most problematic media formats are reported by teachers as video games (75%), television (61%), and computer games (60%); while in middle school and high school problematic technologies take on more interpersonal roles such as texting and social media. In the context of new media benefits however, 63% of teachers surveyed said students are better at finding information, 34% can multitask effectively, and almost 20% teachers noted positive outcomes leading to prosocial behaviors and broadened perspectives. Heavy media users are also said to be 15% less likely to get good grades (A's and B's), and 24% more likely to have grades averaging C's or below. They also note that media exposure has increased from 7 hours and 29 minutes in 1999, to 10 hours and 45 minutes in 2009. Links to personal contentment were also recorded in relation to heavy, moderate, and light media use.

== The study of childhood ==
Children's studies and the study of childhood is an interdisciplinary field of study in which pedagogy and research examines themes specific to infants, children, and adolescents. Several universities through the world are now starting to develop programs that focus only on the study of youth populations. In 1991, Brooklyn College became the first university in the U.S. to initiate a program of its kind. According to the university's website research is conducted, "on behalf of children and youth and assistance to governmental and advocacy agencies as well as community-based organizations in their work on behalf of children and young people". According to the City College of New York web-site the discipline prepares for jobs in:

- Advertising and corporate sectors with focus on children
- Arts education
- Attorneys, judges, prosecutors and legal experts, who work with children in family and criminal courts, juvenile justice systems, child protective local and state agencies, and law firms representing children and young people
- Child advocacy organizations (local, national and international)
- Child life specialist
- Child protective services
- Child welfare
- Children and the media and publishing industries
- Children and mental/public health
- Education
- Guidance counselor
- Human rights organizations (local, state and international)
- Juvenile justice
- Pediatrics
- Research
- Social work
- Youth and after-school programs

Rutgers University features a similar program, the Department of Childhood Studies, which focuses on issues, concepts and debates related to childhood in a "multidisciplinary approach" informed by both humanistic and social science perspectives. Studies include theorizing and capturing the essence of the representation of the Child in order to, "study children and childhoods within contemporary cultural and global contexts".

The University of Sheffield is home to the Centre for the Study of Childhood and Youth (CSCY), established in 2002, which is an interdisciplinary research centre for the study of childhood and youth. The center is composed of members of various university departments. The centre also "has a number of international partners from around the globe, creating opportunities for collaborative research on theoretical and substantive issues".

The International Childhood and Youth Research Network (ICYRNet) is an organization that brings together the field of youth studies by conducting joint research programs, organizing researchers, disseminating information, publishing research, training staff and students, and serving as a "Virtual Resource Center" for researchers of childhood. This list is taken in part from ICYRNet references to colleges and universities that have programs in Childhood and Youth Studies:

- Brandeis University, The Family and Child Policy Center
- Brunel University, Centre for Child-Focused Anthropological Research
- Case Western Reserve University, Schubert Center for Child Development
- Columbia University, Center for Children and Families
- Columbia University, Institute for Child and Family Policy
- Columbia University, The Clearinghouse on International Developments in Child, Youth and Family Policies
- Columbia University, National Center for Children in Poverty
- Ghent University, Children's Rights Center
- Georgetown University, Center for Child and Human Development
- Georgetown University, National Center for Education in Maternal and Child Health
- Harvard University, Harvard's Children's Initiative
- Harvard University, Harvard Family Research Project
- Indiana University at Bloomington, Center for Adolescent Studies
- Johns Hopkins University, Welfare, Children, and Families
- Leeds University, The Centre for Research on Family, Kinship and Childhood
- Mahidol University, Bangkok, National Institute for Child and Family Development
- Penn State University, Children, Youth and Families Consortium
- Norwegian University of Science and Technology, The Norwegian Center for Child Research
- Princeton University, Center for Research on Child Well Being
- Queens University, Institute of Child Care Research
- Rutgers University, Center for Children and Childhood Studies
- Salem State University, Center for Childhood and Youth Studies
- Stanford University, Stanford Center on Adolescence
- Tata Institute of Social Sciences, Unit for Child and Youth Research
- Trinity College Dublin, Children's Research Centre
- University of California, Berkeley, Center for Child and Youth Policy
- University of California, Santa Cruz, Center for Research on Education, Diversity & Excellence
- University of Cape Town, The Children's Institute
- University of Cambridge, Center for Family Research
- University of Chicago, Chapin Hall Center for Children
- University of Colombo, Sri Lanka, The National Education Research and Evaluation Centre
- University of Copenhagen, Center for Youth and Media Studies
- University of Florida, Center for Children s Literature and Culture
- University of Glasgow, Youth, Education and Employment Research Unit
- University of Iowa, National Resource Center for Family Centered Practice
- University of London, Programme on International Rights of the Child
- University of Maryland, Collaborative Center for Child Well-being
- University of Michigan, Child Development Supplement to the Panel Study of Income Dynamics, Institute of Social Research
- University of Nebraska-Lincoln, The Center on Children, Families and the Law
- University of New Hampshire at Durham, Family Research Laboratory
- University of Northern Iowa, National Coalition for Campus Children's Centers
- University of North Carolina at Chapel Hill, Frank Porter Graham Child Development Center
- University of Otago, New Zealand, Children's Issues Centre
- University of Pennsylvania, National Center on Fathers and Families
- University of London, Institute of Education, PATHWAYS Programme
- University of Sheffield, Center for the Study of Childhood and Youth
- University of South Carolina, The Center for Child and Family Studies
- University of Virginia, Center for Children, Families and Law
- University of Winnipeg, Center for Research in Young People's Texts and Cultures
- Yale University, School of the 21st Century

== See also ==
- Center on Media and Child Health (CMCH)
- Children's song
- Children's street culture
- Children's geographies
- Children's television series
- Girl studies / Girlhood studies

== Related journals ==
- American Behavioral Scientist
- Applied Development Psychology
- Children
- Children and Computer Technology
- Girlhood Studies
- Journal of Adolescents
- Journal of Children and Media
- Journal of Child and Family Studies
- Journal of Child Psychology and Psychiatry
- Journal of Consumer Research
- Journal of Media & Cultural Studies
- Journal of the American Academy of Child and Adolescent Psychiatry
- Mass Communication and Society
- Pediatrics
