= Jeylan Mortimer =

American sociologist

Jeylan T. Mortimer
- Born: United States
- Occupations: Sociologist, academic and author

Academic background
- Education: B.A., Sociology; M.A., Sociology; PHD, Sociology
- Alma mater: Tufts University; University of Michigan

Jeylan T. Mortimer is an American sociologist. She is Professor Emeritus at the University of Minnesota, where she founded the Life Course Center and served as its Director from 1986 to 2006.

== Early life and education ==
Mortimer was born August 12, 1943, in Chicago. She earned her Bachelor of Arts degree from Jackson College for Women, Tufts University (1965) and her Master's (1967) and PhD (1972) degrees in sociology from the University of Michigan.

== Career ==
Mortimer began her academic career at the University of Maryland as Instructor and then assistant professor of sociology from 1971 to 1973. She then moved to the University of Minnesota where she progressed through the ranks from Visiting Assistant Professor to Professor (1973–1982). In 2021, she retired as professor emeritus of Sociology at the University of Minnesota.

Mortimer served as the Founding Director of the Life Course Center from 1986 to 2006, while concurrently holding the position of Associate Chair of Sociology at the University of Minnesota during the periods 1984 to 1987, 1993 to 1996, and 1999 to 2002. Additionally, she served as the Director of Graduate Studies in Sociology from 2016 to 2020.

== Scholarly contributions ==
Mortimer and her collaborators have authored more than 200 publications spanning the fields of sociology, social psychology, the life course, developmental psychology and family studies. She is Principal Investigator of the longitudinal, three-generation Youth Development Study, which has followed a cohort of youth over three decades from mid-adolescence to mid-life. Among her authored and edited works are publications in leading academic journals as well as research monographs and edited volumes.

=== Multigenerational attainment processes ===
Mortimer's early research examined the impacts of parental occupations on the occupational choices of college students, focusing on key dimensions of work (entrepreneurial-bureaucratic, work with people vs. data or things). Subsequently, she found pervasive effects of parental work experiences and hardship on children's achievement orientations, intrinsic and extrinsic work values, and occupational destinations. Her research has also examined educational attainment, including the impacts of grandparents' and parents' educations on parents' expectations for their children, the transmission of educational plans and advantage across three generations, and the determinants of upward educational mobility. Moreover, her research revealed differences in educational attainment processes across contemporary parent and child cohorts.

=== The developmental impacts of work experience ===
Mortimer's early research showed that adult work experiences influence psychological development, including occupational values, a sense of personal efficacy, commitment to work, political orientation, and the interrelations of prominent work attitudes (job satisfaction and involvement).

Mortimer's book, Working and Growing Up in America revealed developmental benefits of teenage employment, contrary to the common notion that adolescent work is problematic. Her Youth Development Study followed teens from ninth grade to adulthood, finding that those who worked moderately during high school (20 hours or fewer per week in most months of observation) had higher levels of educational attainment than those who worked more intensively, who moved quickly into jobs they considered "careers". More problematic outcomes were experienced by adolescents who worked sporadically, without a consistent pattern of schooling and working. Early work experiences were found to influence adolescent self-esteem, control orientation, occupational values, and vocational development, as well as adolescent depressed mood, behavioral adjustment, and family relationships. Her research also revealed that teenage employment is reflected in the response to work experiences during the transition to adulthood. Her more recent studies show substantial continuity of work quality from adolescence to mid-life (in work autonomy, opportunities for learning and advancement, wage satisfaction, and work stressors). Moreover, her research also revealed positive developmental consequences of another form of adolescent work, volunteering.

=== Attitudinal stability through the life course ===
Mortimer has contributed to the understanding of stability in the self-concept and other attitudes through the life course, including the conceptualization and measurement of stability. Additionally, her research has demonstrated the differential responsiveness of attitudes to work experiences across phases of life.

=== The transition to adulthood ===
Much of Mortimer's work has focused on the transition to adulthood, including the timing of leaving home, the school to work transition, the process of developing an identity as an adult, and the attainment of financial independence from parents. Her work has shown how parents provide safety nets for their transitioning children and how youth unemployment and parental assistance threaten young adult self-efficacy. Her longitudinal study documented the relative value of educational attainments (high school diplomas, some college, Associates' and BA degrees) in the labor market. Finally, her research has identified transitional experiences that contribute to the motherhood wage penalty.

== Awards and honors ==
- 1984 – Sociological Research Association
- 1987 – Fellow, American Association for the Advancement of Science
- 2004 – Dean's Medal, College of Liberal Arts, University of Minnesota
- 2011 – Cooley-Mead Award, Section on Social Psychology, American Sociological Association
- 2016 – Distinguished Career Award, Section on Children and Youth, American Sociological Association
- 2020 – John Bynner Distinguished Scholar Award, Society for Longitudinal and Life Course Studies

== Personal life ==
Mortimer is married to Jeffrey Broadbent, professor emeritus at the University of Minnesota.

== Bibliography ==
=== Books ===
- Mortimer, Jeylan T.; Lorence, Jon; Kumka, Donald S. (1986). Work, Family, and Personality: Transition of Adulthood. Bloomsbury Academic. ISBN 978-0-89391-293-2.
- Mortimer, Jeylan T.; Shanahan, Michael J., eds. (2003). Handbook of the Life Course. Handbooks of Sociology and Social Research. doi:10.1007/b100507. ISBN 978-0-306-47498-9.
- Mortimer, Jeylan T. (2003). Working and Growing up in America. doi:10.4159/9780674041240. ISBN 978-0-674-04124-0.
- Shanahan, Michael J.; Mortimer, Jeylan T.; Johnson, Monica Kirkpatrick, eds. (2016). Handbook of the Life Course. Handbooks of Sociology and Social Research. doi:10.1007/978-3-319-20880-0. ISBN 978-3-319-20879-4.

=== Selected articles ===
- Mortimer, Jeylan T.; Lorence, Jon (1979). "Work Experience and Occupational Value Socialization: A Longitudinal Study". American Journal of Sociology. 84 (6): 1361–1385. doi:10.1086/226938. JSTOR 2777896. S2CID 143580550.
- Mortimer, J. T.; Finch, M.D.; Kumka, D. (1982). "Persistence and change in development: The multidimensional self-concept". In Baltes, Paul B. (ed.). Life-span Development and Behavior. Academic Press. pp. 263–313. ISBN 978-0-12-431804-5.
- Mortimer, Jeylan T. (March 2012). "The Evolution, Contributions, and Prospects of the Youth Development Study: An Investigation in Life Course Social Psychology". Social Psychology Quarterly. 75 (1): 5–27. doi:10.1177/0190272511434911. PMC 3404601. PMID 22844173.
- Mortimer, Jeylan T.; Zhang, Lei; Wu, Chen-Yu; Hussemann, Jeanette; Johnson, Monica Kirkpatrick (March 2017). "Familial Transmission of Educational Plans and the Academic Self-Concept: A Three-Generation Longitudinal Study". Social Psychology Quarterly. 80 (1): 85–107. doi:10.1177/0190272516670582. PMC 5384102. PMID 28396611.
- Mortimer, Jeylan T. (April 2022). "Agency, linked lives and historical time: evidence from the longitudinal three-generation Youth Development Study". Longitudinal and Life Course Studies. 13 (2): 195–216. doi:10.1332/175795921X16398283564306. PMC 9350070. PMID 35920620.
