= Non-representational theory =

Post-structuralist human geography theory

Non-representational theory is a form of theory developed in human geography. It is the work of Nigel Thrift. The theory is based on using social theory, conducting geographical research, and the 'embodied experience.'

== Definition ==
Instead of studying and representing social relationships, non-representational theory focuses upon practices – how human and nonhuman formations are enacted or performed – not simply on what is produced. "First, it valorizes those processes that operate before … conscious, reflective thought … [and] second, it insists on the necessity of not prioritizing representations as the primary epistemological vehicles through which knowledge is extracted from the world". Recent studies have examined a wide range of activities including dance, musical performance, walking, gardening, rave, listening to music and children's play.

== Post-structuralist origins ==
This is a post-structuralist theory inspired in part by the ideas of the physicist-philosopher Niels Bohr, and continental thinkers such as Karen Barad, Gilles Deleuze, Michel Foucault, Félix Guattari, Bruno Latour and Michel Serres, and by phenomenonologists such as Martin Heidegger and Maurice Merleau-Ponty. More recently it considers views from political science (including ideas about radical democracy) and anthropological discussions of the material dimensions of human life. It parallels the conception of "hybrid geographies" developed by Sarah Whatmore.

== Criticism ==
Critics have suggested that Thrift's use of the term "non-representational theory" is problematic, and that other non-representational theories could be developed. Richard G. Smith said that Baudrillard's work could be considered a "non-representational theory", for example, which has fostered some debate. In 2005, Hayden Lorimer (Glasgow University) said that the term "more-than-representational" was preferable.
