= Zoogeography =

Science of the geographic distribution of animal species

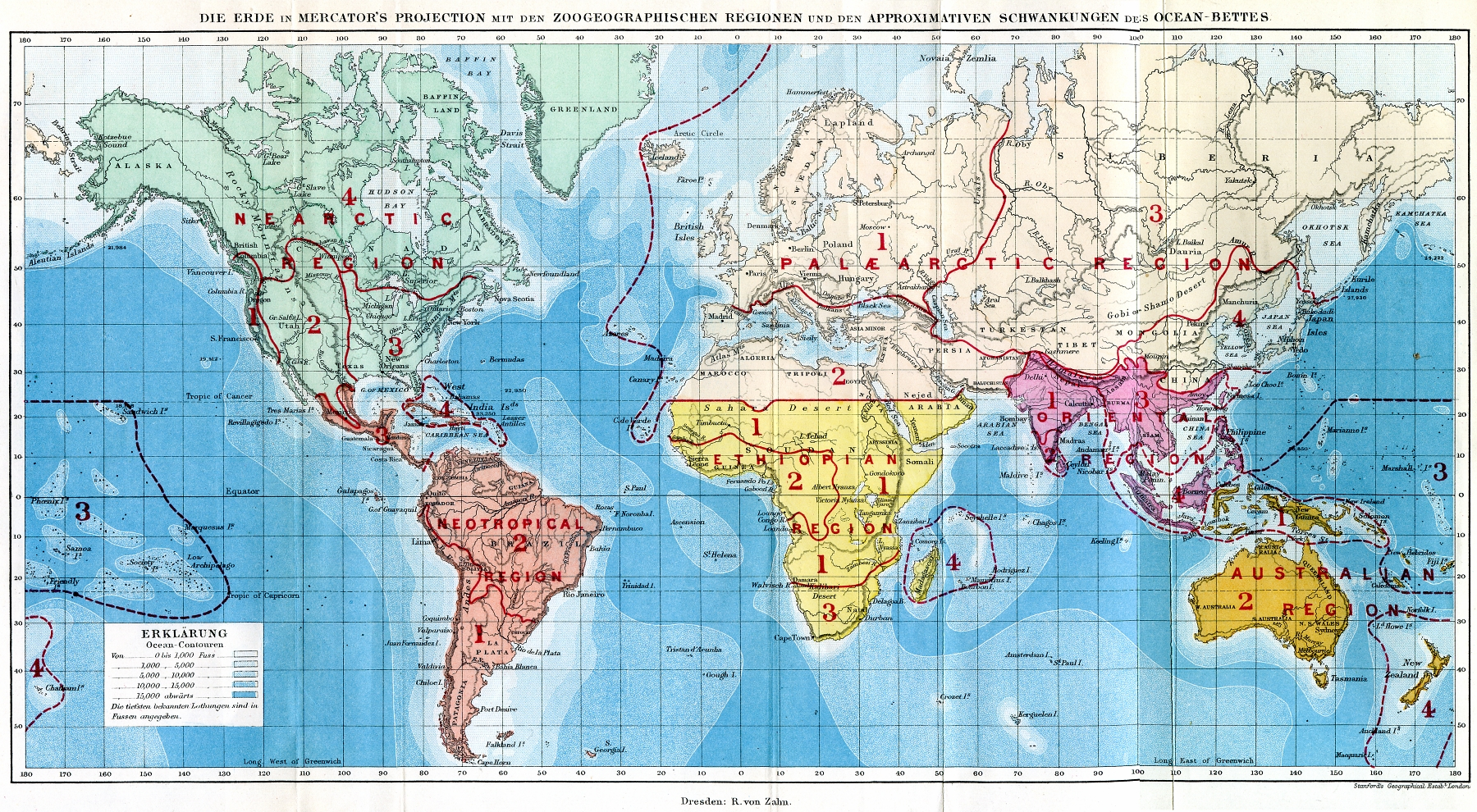
Zoogeographic regions of Wallace, 1876

Zoogeography is the branch of the science of biogeography that is concerned with geographic distribution (present and past) of animal species.

As a multifaceted field of study, zoogeography incorporates methods of molecular biology, genetics, morphology, phylogenetics, and Geographic Information Systems (GIS) to delineate evolutionary events within defined regions of study around the globe. As proposed by Alfred Russel Wallace, known as the father of zoogeography, phylogenetic affinities can be quantified among zoogeographic regions, further elucidating the phenomena surrounding geographic distributions of organisms and explaining evolutionary relationships of taxa.

Advancements in molecular biology and theory of evolution within zoological research has unraveled questions concerning speciation events and has expanded phylogenic relationships amongst taxa. Integration of phylogenetics with GIS provides a means for communicating evolutionary origins through cartographic design. Related research linking phylogenetics and GIS has been conducted in areas of the southern Atlantic, Mediterranean, and Pacific Oceans. Recent innovations in DNA bar-coding, for example, have allowed for explanations of phylogenetic relationships within two families of marine venomous fishes, scorpaenidae and tetraodontidae, residing in the Andaman Sea. Continued efforts to understand species evolutionary divergence articulated in the geologic time scale based on fossil records for killifish (Aphanius and Aphanolebias) in locales of the Mediterranean and Paratethys areas revealed climatological influences during the Miocene Further development of research within zoogeography has expanded upon knowledge of the productivity of South Atlantic ocean regions and distribution of organisms in analogous regions, providing both ecological and geographic data to supply a framework for the taxonomic relationships and evolutionary branching of benthic polychaetes.

Modern-day zoogeography also places a reliance on GIS to integrate a more precise understanding and predictive model of the past, current, and future population dynamics of animal species both on land and in the ocean. Through employment of GIS technology, linkages between abiotic factors of habitat such as topography, latitude, longitude, temperatures, and sea level can serve to explain the distribution of species populations through geologic time. Understanding correlations of habitat formation and the migration patterns of organisms at an ecological level allows for explanations of speciation events that may have arisen due to physical geographic isolation events or the incorporation of new refugia to survive unfavorable environmental conditions

== Zoogeographic regions ==
Schmarda (1853) proposed 21 regions, while Woodward proposed 27 terrestrial and 18 marine, Murray (1866) proposed 4, Blyth (1871) proposed 7, Allen (1871) 8 regions, Heilprin (1871) proposed 6, Newton (1893) proposed 6, Gadow (1893) proposed 4.

Philip Sclater (1858) and Alfred Wallace (1876) identified the main zoogeographic regions of the world used today: Palaearctic, Aethiopian (today Afrotropic), India (today Indomalayan), Australasian, Nearctic and Neotropical.

Marine regionalization began with Ortmann (1896).

In a similar way to geobotanic divisions, our planet is divided in zoogeographical (or faunal) regions (further divided as provinces, territories and districts), sometimes including the categories Empire and Domain.

The current trend is to classify the floristic kingdoms of botany or zoogeographic regions of zoology as biogeographic realms.

Following, some examples of regionalizations:

=== Sclater (1857) ===
Creatio Palaeogeana

- I. Regio Palaearctica
- II. Regio Aethiopica
- III. Regio Indica
- IV. Regio Australiana

Creatio Neogeana

- V. Regio Nearctica
- VI. Regio Neotropica

=== Huxley (1868) ===
Huxley (1868) scheme:

- Arctogea
  - Nearctic province
  - Palaearctic province
  - Ethiopian province
  - Indian province
- Notogea
  - Austro-Columbia province (= Neotropical)
  - Australasia province (= Australian; Eastern Palaeotropical)

=== Wallace (1876) ===
- Palaearctic region
- Ethiopian region
- Oriental region
- Australian region
- Neotropical region
- Nearctic region

=== Trouessart (1890) ===
Scheme by Trouessart (1890):

- Arctic region
- Antarctic region
- Palearctic region
- Nearctic region
- Ethiopian region
- Oriental region
- Neotropical region
- Australian region

=== Darlington (1957) ===
First scheme:

- Realm Megagea (Arctogea): the main part of the world
  - 1. Ethiopian Region: Africa (except the northern corner), with part of southern Arabia
  - 2. Oriental Region: tropical Asia, with associated continental islands
  - 3. Palearctic Region: Eurasia above the tropics, with the northern corner of Africa
  - 4. Nearctic Region: North America, excepting the tropical part of Mexico
- Realm Neogea
  - 5. Neotropical Region: South and Central America with the tropical part of Mexico
- Realm Notogea
  - 6. Australian Region: Australia, with New Guinea, etc.

Second scheme:

- Climate-limited regions
  - 1. Palearctic Region
  - 2. Nearctic Region
- Main regions of the Old World tropics
  - 3. Oriental Region
  - 4. Ethiopian Region
- Barrier-limited regions
  - 5. Neotropical Region
  - 6. Australian Region

== See also ==
- Animal geographies
- Fauna
- Animals
- Zoology
- Léon Croizat

== Bibliography ==
- Bodenheimer, F.S. (1935). Animal life in Palestine. An introduction to the problems of animal ecology and zoogeography. L. Mayer: Jerusalem. 506 p., .
- Ekman, Sven (1953). Zoogeography of the sea. London, Sidgwick and Jackson. 417 p.
