= William Bunge =

American geographer (1928–2013)

William Wheeler Bunge Jr.
- Born: 1928; La Crosse, Wisconsin, U.S.
- Died: October 31, 2013 (aged 85); Canada
- Education: University of Wisconsin; University of Washington
- Scientific career
- Fields: Quantitative geography, Theoretical geography, Radical geography
- Workplaces: State University of Iowa; Wayne State University; University of Western Ontario; York University
- Academic advisors: Richard Hartshorne

William Wheeler Bunge Jr. (born 1928, La Crosse, Wisconsin; died October 31, 2013, Canada) was an American geographer active mainly as a quantitative geographer and spatial theorist. He also became a radical geographer and anti-war activist in the US and Canada.

== Personal life ==
Bunge served in the American Fifth Army during the height of the Korean War, November 1950 to November 1952, where he served in the Chemical, Biological and Radiological (CBRN) Wartime School at Camp McCoy, Wisconsin. He completed a master's degree at the University of Wisconsin in 1955. He studied under Richard Hartshorne, the first professional geographer he had ever met. He gained a PhD in quantitative geography from the Department of Geography, University of Washington in 1960.

His first job teaching geography was at the State University of Iowa, from 1960 to 1961. Bunge reports he was fired from this position. He worked as an assistant professor at Wayne State University, Detroit, Michigan from 1962 to 1969 but became disillusioned with conservative US politics, racism, and the Vietnam War and its supporters. He was blacklisted as a communist sympathizer by the Chairman of the U.S. House of Representatives Internal Security Committee, who included him as one of 65 radicals. He moved to Canada and taught at the University of Western Ontario from 1970 to 1971 and at York University (1972–1973). He resided in Quebec, and in 1998 became the "Representative of the Parti Communiste du Québec to the Federal government".

Bunge was married to Elizabeth Carpenter (Betty), from Milwaukee, Wisconsin. He met and married Donia in 1971. They met in Guadeloupe and married in Canada. He was father to Susan, Jane, Jocelyn and Carl.

== Academic contributions ==
Bunge made major contributions to theoretical, quantitative spatial analysis earlier in his career (Bunge, 1962). Almost at the same time, he became an urban radical, supporting applied geography of social change and justice in inner city America and Canada. He formed the Detroit Geographical Expedition in partnership with Gwendolyn Warren in 1968 and the Society for Human Exploration in 1971. The Toronto Geographical Expedition ran from 1973. All of these projects turned geography "in" to the immediate surroundings and issues of the inner city, rather than "out" to exciting new discoveries in foreign climes (Bunge 1971).

He did not work in an academic environment after 1973, when he was employed at York, colleagues finding him too threatening and confrontational (Wisner nd; Goodchild 2008). In 1975 Bunge and Ronald Bordessa's book The Canadian Alternative: Survival, Expeditions and Urban Change contained a chapter entitled "Machineism versus Lifeism" in which they wrote that "Lifeism, which places man-kind's survival as central..." must defeat its opposite, Machineism, the open-ended worship of machines.

Bunge himself came to dislike academic institutions. Goodchild reports "The graduate seminar he gave at the University of Western Ontario was well received by many of the students, but his openly expressed disgust with the political positions of some of his colleagues made it impossible to renew his contract. He drove taxis for a time in Toronto, and eventually settled in small-town Quebec." Nonetheless, his latest book was published in 1988, and was well received (Bunge 1988).

His legacy has been discussed in several articles and his work on "geographical expeditions" to the uncharted areas of the inner city, rather than to distant shores, was path breaking (Warren et al. 2019; Katz 1996; Merrifield 1995). It involved policy lobbying, direct support to poor households, and analysis of urban problems. He said of his Detroit Expedition "Exploring humans in a meaningful way is fraught with physical danger."

His cartographic representations of spatial patterns, particularly in theoretical geography, were also innovative, although somewhat eclipsed by later innovations in geographic information systems (Goodchild 2008). Barnes (1996) suggests he remained wedded to 'scientific' socialism, setting him apart from colleagues like David Harvey who soon rejected their roots in quantitative geography and scientific method when they took on Marxist forms of analysis. Bunge consistently argued that geometrical patterns and morphological laws express disadvantage and injustice under contemporary capitalism, and that identified patterns could be remedied by rational methods.

== Publications ==
- Bunge, W., 1962. Theoretical Geography. First Edition. Lund Studies in Geography Series C: General and Mathematical Geography. Lund, Sweden: Gleerup.
- Bunge, W., 1964. Geographical Dialectics. The Professional Geographer,16(4):28 - 29 doi:10.1111/j.0033-0124.1964.028_q.x
- Bunge, W., 1966. Gerrymandering, Geography, and Grouping. Geographical Review, Vol. 56, pp. 256–263.
- Bunge, W., 1966. Locations Are Not Unique. Annals of the Association of American Geographers, Vol. 56, pp. 375–376.
- Bunge, W., 1966. Theoretical Geography. Second Edition. Lund Studies in Geography Series C: General and Mathematical Geography, No. 1. Lund, Sweden: Gleerup.
- Bunge, W., 1968. Fred K. Schaefer and the science of geography. Harvard Papers in Theoretical Geography, Special Papers Series, Paper A, Laboratory for Computer Graphics and Spatial Analysis, Harvard University, Cambridge, MA.
- Bunge, W., 1969. The first years of the Detroit Geographical Expedition: a personal report Published by Detroit, Society for Human Exploration. 59 p. LCCN:72180053 Dewey:910/.7/11 LC: G74.5 .B8
- Bunge, W., 1969. Atlas of Love and Hate. Detroit: The Society for Human Exploration
- Bunge, W., 1971. Fitzgerald; Geography of a Revolution. Cambridge, MA: Schenkman. A book about one square mile in the centre of Detroit.
- Bunge, W., 1973. The Geography. Professional Geographer, Vol. 25, pp. 331–337.
- Bunge, W., 1973. The Geography of Human Survival. Annals of the Association of American Geographers, Vol. 63, pp. 275–295.
- Bunge, W., 1973. Commentary: spatial prediction. Annals of the Association of American Geographers 63(4): 566–568.
- Bunge, W., 1974. Fitzgerald from a Distance. Annals of the Association of American Geographers, Vol. 64, pp. 485–489.
- Bunge, W. and R. Bordessa. 1975. The Canadian Alternative - Survival. Expeditions and urban change. York University, Toronto.
- Bunge, W., 1979. Perspective on Theoretical Geography. Annals of the Association of American Geographers 69: 169–174.
- Bunge, W., 1979. Fred K. Schaefer and the Science of Geography. Annals of the Association of American Geographers, Vol. 69, pp. 128–132.
- Bunge, W., 1988. The Nuclear War Atlas. New York: Blackwell.

== Discussion in the literature ==
- Rich Heyman. 2007. Who's going to man the factories and be the sexual slaves if we all get PhDs? Democratizing Knowledge Production, Pedagogy, and the Detroit Geographical Expedition and Institute. Antipode, pp. 99–120
- Trevor J. Barnes. 1996. Logics of dislocation: models, metaphors, and meanings of economic space. Guilford Press. ISBN 978-1-57230-039-2
- Goodchild, M.F. 2008. Theoretical Geography (1962): William Bunge. In P. Hubbard, R. Kitchin, and G. Valentine, (eds.) Key Texts in Human Geography. Los Angeles: SAGE, pp. 9–16.
- Merrifield A. 1995. SITUATED KNOWLEDGE THROUGH EXPLORATION: REFLECTIONS ON BUNGE'S 'GEOGRAPHICAL EXPEDITIONS' Antipode 27 (1):49-70
- Wisner, B. nd. Notes from Underground: The Beginning of Antipode. Antipode Online
- Cindi Katz. 1996. The Expeditions of Conjurors: Ethnography, Power, and Pretense. In D.L. Wolf (Ed.) Feminist Dilemmas in Field Research. Westview Press pp. 170-84.
- Gwendolyn Warren, Cindi Katz, and Nik Heynen. 2019. Myths, Cults, Memories, and Revisions in Radical Geographic History: Revisiting the Detroit

Geographical Expedition and Institute. In T.J. Barnes and E. Sheppard (Eds.) Spatial Histories of Radical Geography North America and Beyond, Oxford: Wiley and Sons. pp. 59-85.
