= Childhood studies =

Multi-disciplinary field

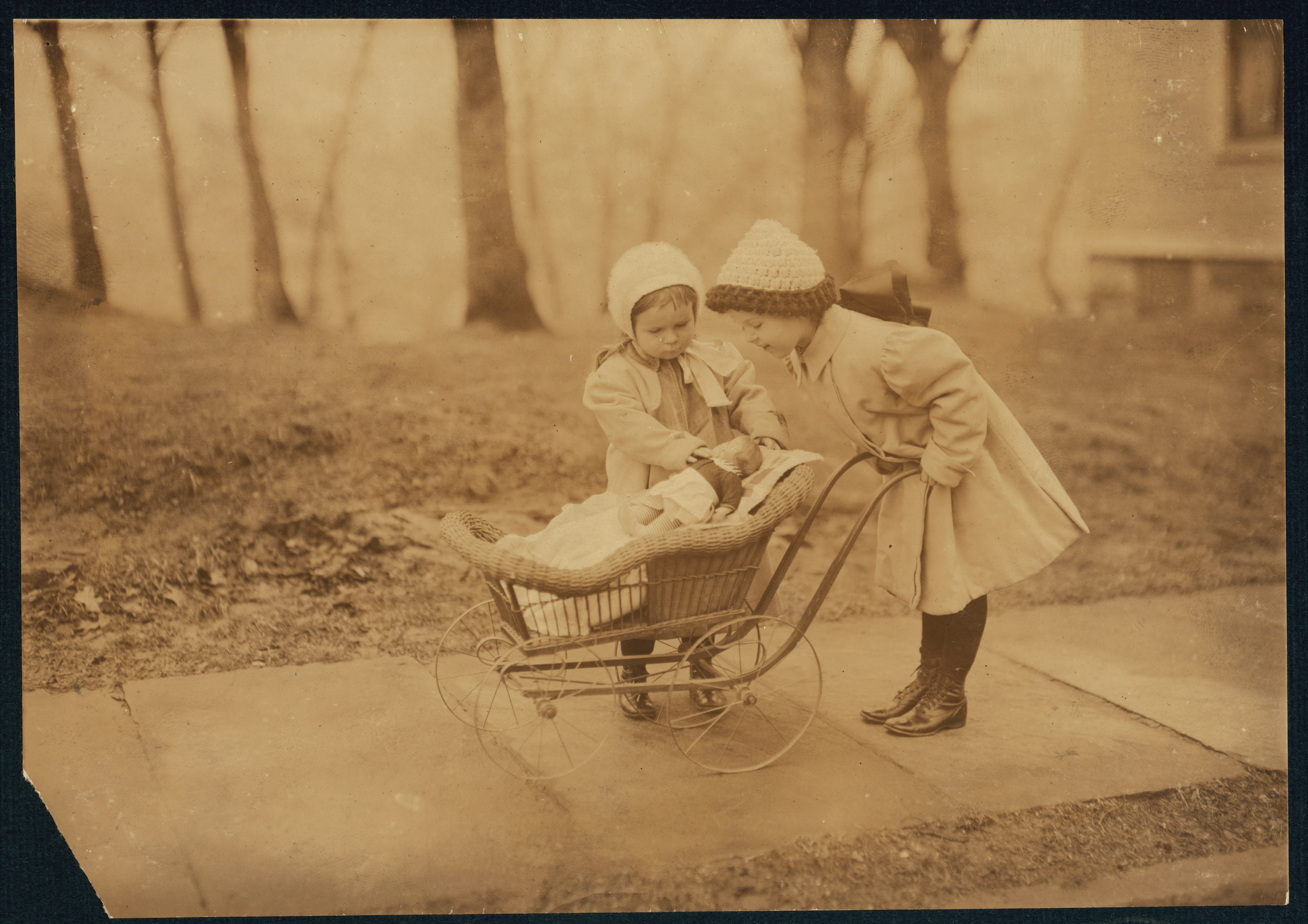
Photograph of children playing

Child studies, Childhood studies and/or children's studies (CS) is an interdisciplinary field that seeks to understand the experience of children and childhood, both historically and in the contemporary world. CS views childhood as a complex social phenomenon with an emphasis on children's agency as social actors, and acknowledges that childhood is socially constructed as the concept of childhood is not universal. CS draws on scholarship in the social sciences (specifically anthropology, economics, history, and sociology), the humanities (especially literature, religion, philosophy, and the fine arts), and the behavioral sciences (with an emphasis on psychology).

== History ==
=== Founding ===
The field emerged during the late 1980's and early 1990's in different parts of the Nordic countries and the UK. The interdisciplinary field of children's studies in the US was founded at Brooklyn College of The City University of New York in the fall of 1991. Its aim was to promote a unified approach to the study of children and youth across the arts, humanities, natural sciences, social sciences, medicine, and law. This new concept emphasized an interdisciplinary and comprehensive approach to studying children aged 0 to 18 years old. The concept of CS was introduced and coined in contradistinction to the Child Study Movement initiated by Stanley Hall at the turn of the 20th century, which focuses on child psychology and development.

After Brooklyn College initiated this field in 1991, other academic institutions established children's studies programs, and in subsequent years the concept of childhood studies and the field of children's studies emerged. Today there are children's studies and childhood studies programs at numerous academic institutions worldwide.

=== Academic growth, interdisciplinary subfields ===
In 1988, the first PhD degree programme in CS was established in Linköping University, Sweden. In the 1990s, Northumbria University was one of the first to offer a degree in childhood studies in the UK. Rutgers University-Camden developed the first Childhood Studies Department in the United States to award degrees from BA through Ph.D. This is a multi-disciplinary department in which Ph.D. students study a range of methodologies to explore cultural constructions of childhood. In the United States, there are now dozens of children/childhood "modules", minors, or concentrations available within degree programs. There are also BA and master's programs across the globe.

Rutgers University-Camden also operates The Center for Children's and Childhood Studies, the Rutgers University Press Book Series in Childhood Studies, and The Exploring Childhood Studies listserve, an online community of over 1500 academics and practitioners studying children and childhood in every discipline and around the world. The Children's Studies Center for Research, Policy, and Public Service was established at Brooklyn College in 1997. In 2011, the title of the children's studies program at Brooklyn College was officially changed to "Children and Youth Studies". Childhood, a major international journal in the field, was established in 1993. The Palgrave Handbook of Childhood Studies, edited by Jens Qvortrup, William Corsaro, and Michael-Sebastian Honig was published in 2009.

York University in Canada quotes Lenzer in its proposal for a new degree program in Children's Studies, writing "In a special issue of The Lion and the Unicorn in 2001, Gertrud Lenzer, co-founder and Director of the Children's Studies Program and Children's Studies Center at Brooklyn College, provides a brief history of, and rationale for, the emerging field of children's studies. According to Lenzer, before the 1990s, most disciplines in the arts and sciences failed to "provide a special focus on children"; indeed, advertisers and politicians "discovered" childhood before scholars did. Only during the past two decades, Lenzer argues, has "an increasing number of disciplines in the arts and sciences ... begun to manifest an interest in children and youth. In the humanities, these growing subfields include children's literature, the history of childhood, and the philosophy of children." However, Lenzer suggests, even "the recent sharpening focus on children and youth in the humanities, social sciences, and international law" limited the efficacy of studies of children and childhood because "the intellectual division of labor in children-related scholarship across the disciplines was largely adding new subspecialties of and within the disciplines themselves."

By contrast, Lenzer emphasizes the need for holistic, interdisciplinary—indeed, humanities-based—approaches to children's studies: "... [C]hildren are not fully characterized by psychological developmental processes, nor ... by any single perspective. ... [C]hildren also exist ... as individuals, as a social and cultural class, and as a historical generation." York's children's studies program adopts many goals Lenzer proposes for this emerging area "as a genuinely interdisciplinary, multidisciplinary new field of study. By bringing carefully chosen knowledge of children from different studies to bear upon the class or category of children to students in a Liberal Arts course of learning, we hope that a more holistic understanding of children and childhood should emerge, which in the end will represent more than simply the sum of its parts. ... Children's Studies ... makes the ontological claim that children must be viewed in their fullness as human beings." The importance of this field of study was underscored in March 2005, at the "Off to See the Wizard: Quests and Memory in Children's Literature" conference, when Roni Natov, author of Poetics of Childhood (2002), suggested that "interdisciplinary childhood studies" would transform future understandings of children and children's literature."

=== International childhood studies ===
The emerging field of "international childhood studies" is a notable new development in the field of childhood studies. International childhood studies are interested in how global and international structures and processes shape children's lives and the cultures of childhood. Birkbeck College offers MSc and Ph.D. studies in international childhood studies in the Department of Geography, Environment, and Development Studies, reflecting the strong interest of this field in the intersections between childhood and international development. Karen Wells writes in Childhood in a Global Perspective (Polity 2009) that "global processes and structures—especially the increasing influence of international law and international NGOs are reshaping childhood" (2009:1).

Further developments in this area include the launch in 2011 of a new journal, Global Studies of Childhood, and a two-year ESRC seminar series, Violence and Childhood: international perspectives (www.internationalchildhoodstudies.org). Other important developments include the establishment of the research Section "Sociology of Children and Youth" in the American Sociological Association and the thematic group on "Sociology of Childhood" in the International Sociological Association. For the "Sociology of Children and Youth" section, William Corsaro and Jeylan Mortimer were the first recipients of the Distinguished Career Awards and Viviana Zelizer and Jens Qvortrup were the first recipients of the Distinguished Career Service Awards.

== See also ==
- History of childhood
- History of childhood in the United States
- Otherness of childhood
