= Animal geography =

Animal geography is a subfield of the nature–society/human–environment branch of geography as well as a part of the larger, interdisciplinary umbrella of human–animal studies (HAS). Animal geography is defined as the study of "the complex entanglings of human–animal relations with space, place, location, environment and landscape" or "the study of where, when, why and how nonhuman animals intersect with human societies". Recent work advances these perspectives to argue about an ecology of relations in which humans and animals are enmeshed, taking seriously the lived spaces of animals themselves and their sentient interactions with not just human but other nonhuman bodies as well.

The Animal Geography Specialty Group of the Association of American Geographers was founded in 2009 by Monica Ogra and Julie Urbanik, and the Animal Geography Research Network was founded in 2011 by Daniel Allen.

== Overview ==
=== First wave ===
The first wave of animal geography, known as zoogeography, came to prominence as a geographic subfield from the late 1800s through the early part of the 20th century. During this time the study of animals was seen as a key part of the discipline and the goal was "the scientific study of animal life with reference to the distribution of animals on the earth and the mutual influence of environment and animals upon each other". The animals that were the focus of studies were almost exclusively wild animals and zoogeographers were building on the new theories of evolution and natural selection. They mapped the evolution and movement of species across time and space and also sought to understand how animals adapted to different ecosystems. "The ambition was to establish general laws of how animals arranged themselves across the earth's surface or, at smaller scales, to establish patterns of spatial co-variation between animals and other environmental factors." Key works include Newbigin's Animal Geography, Bartholomew, Clarke, and Grimshaw's Atlas of Zoogeography, and Allee and Schmidt's Ecological Animal Geography.

By the middle of the 20th century, emerging disciplines such as biology and zoology began taking on the traditional zoogeographic cataloging of species, their distributions, and ecologies. In geography zoogeography exists today as the vibrant subfield of biogeography.

=== Second wave ===
The middle of the 20th century saw a turn away from zoogeography (while never fully relinquishing it) towards questions about and interest in the impact of humans on wildlife and in human relations with livestock. Two key geographers shaping this wave of animal geography were Carl Sauer and Charles Bennett. Sauer's interest in the cultural landscape – or cultural ecology (how human cultures are shaped and are shaped by their environment)—necessarily involved addressing the topic of animal domestication. In Sauer's research he focused on the history of domestication and how human uses of livestock shaped the landscape (via fencing, grazing, and shelters). Bennett called for a 'cultural animal geography' that focused on the interactions of animals and human cultures such as subsistence hunting and fishing. The shift from the first wave to the second wave of animal geography had to do with the species being studied. Second wave animal geography brought domesticated livestock into the view instead of just focusing on wildlife. For the next several decades animal geography, as cultural ecology, was dominated by research into the origins of domestication, cultural rituals around domestication, and different cultures livestock relations (sedentary versus nomadic herding). Key works include Simoons and Simoons' A Ceremonial Ox of India, Gades' work on the guinea pig, and Cansdale's Animals and Man. Baldwin provides an excellent overview of second wave animal geography research.

=== Third wave ===
In the early 1990s several things happened to cause geographers with an interest in animals and human–animal studies to rethink what was possible within animal geography. The 1980s and early 1990s saw the rise of the worldwide animal advocacy movement addressing everything from pet overpopulation to saving endangered species, exposing cruelty to animals in industrial farming (factory farms or concentrated animal feeding operations), and protesting circuses, the use of fur, and hunting – all an effort to raise the visibility of how humans treat non-human others amongst the general public. In the academy, biologists and ethologists were studying animal behavior and species loss/discovery raising awareness about the experiential lives of animals as well as their perilous existence alongside humans. Social scientists were reassessing what it means to be a subject and breaking into the black box of nature to explore new understandings of the relations between humans and the rest of the planet. Animal geographers realized there was a whole spectrum of human–animal relations that should be addressed from a geographic perspective. At the forefront of this third wave of animal geography was Tuan's work on pets in Dominance and Affection and a special topics issue of the journal Environment and Planning D: Society and Space edited by Wolch and Emel.

The two key features of the third wave of animal geography that distinguish it from the earlier waves are (1) an expanded notion of human–animal relations to include all time periods and locations of human–animal encounters (rather than just wildlife or livestock), and (2) attempts to bring in the animals themselves as subjects. Since the 1995 publication there has been an explosion of case studies and theorizing. Key works that bring together third wave animal geography are Wolch and Emel's Animal Geographies: Place, Politics and Identity in the Nature–Culture Borderlands, Philo and Wilbert's Animal Spaces, Beastly Places: New Geographies of Human–Animal Relations, Urbanik's Placing Animals: An Introduction to the Geography of Human–Animal Relations, Gillespie and Collard's Critical Animal Geographies: Politics, Intersections and Hierarchies in a Multispecies World, and Wilcox and Rutherford's Historical Animal Geographies.

== Areas of focus ==
There are presently nine areas of focus within animal geography:

1. Theorizing animal geography. Two major works addressing how to think about human–animal relations as a whole are Whatmore's Hybrid Geographies, Hobson's work on political animals through the practice of bear-file farming, and new scholarship that look at animals' relations with the material world.
2. Urban animal geography. Researchers in this area seek to understand that cities are, historically and today, multi-species spaces. Theoretical work comes from Wolch et al. on what constitutes a transspecies urban theory and Wolch on manifesting a multi-species city, along with Philo's work on the historical context for the removal of livestock from the city.
3. Ethics and animal geography. How space, place, and time shape what practices on other species are right or wrong is the concern of this area. Articles by Lynn on what he terms geoethics and Jones on what he terms an ethics of encounter are a good place to start.
4. Human identities and animals. How humans use animals to identify themselves as humans or to distinguish between human groups has a fascinating geographical history. Brown and Rasmussen examine the issue of bestiality, Elder et al. explore how animals are used to discriminate against human groups, and Neo studies how ethnicity comes into play with pig production in Malaysia. Others such as Barua argue that the identities of animals may be cosmopolitan, constituted by the circulation of animals and their contact with divergent cultures. These are all excellent case studies.
5. Animals as subjects. One of the most difficult aspects of studying animals is the fact that they can't talk back to us in human language. Animal geographers have been tackling how, exactly, to address the fact that individuals of other species are experiential entities. Examples include work by Barua on elephants, Bear on fish, Hinchliffe et al. on water voles, and Lorimer on nonhuman charisma. Geographers are also contending with how to reconstruct the lives of animal subjects in the past, how these lives may be resurrected from the historical record, and how spatially situated human–animal relations have changed through time.
6. Pets. One of the most intimate relationships that people have with other species is often through the animals living in their homes. How we have shaped these animals to fit human lifestyles and what this means for negotiating a more-than-human existence is the concern here. Key articles include Fox on dogs, Lulka on the American Kennel Club, and Nast on critical pet studies.
7. Working animals. Human uses of other species as labor are quite extensive both historically and today. From logging elephants to laboratory mice and zoo animals to military dogs and draft animals, the spaces and places of how animals work for us make fascinating geographies. For insight see Anderson's work on zoos, Davies' work on virtual zoos and laboratory mice, and Urbanik's work on the politics of animal biotechnology.
8. Farmed animals. How we raise and farm animals – both as food and for their parts (e.g., fur) – is the largest category of actual use of animals. Research in this area has focused on the development of industrial farming systems, the ethics of consuming animals, and how livestock relations impact notions of place. Buller and Morris discuss farm animal welfare, Holloway examines technological advances in dairy production, Hovorka looks at urban livestock in Africa, and Yarwood et al. explore the livestock landscape.
9. Wild animals. To date, animal geographers have done the most work with this category of human–animal relations. From theoretical explorations of wildlife classification to case studies of human–wildlife conflict, wildlife tourism, to particular human–wild animal geographies, this has proven a dynamic avenue. Key articles include Emel's work on wolves, work on wildlife and mobility, Vaccaro and Beltran's work on reintroductions, Whatmore and Thorne's work on relational typologies of wildlife, and further extensions of the latter's work through explorations of animals and conservation in historical and contemporary trans-national contexts.

== Animals of focus ==
Despite an entire menagerie of animals being the subjects of the animal geographies project, certain species have received more attention than others. These creatures have been ideal 'model' organisms for asking questions about animals in geographical thought.

=== Elephants ===
Elephants have featured most prominently in animal geography, beginning with the work of Whatmore & Thorne on the spatial configurations of wildlife. They ask questions about how the African elephant Duchess is configured by different practices in zoos, contrasting her with counterparts in the wild. Whatmore & Thorne's exploration of becoming-elephant was a milestone in animal and more-than-human geographies. Asian elephants have also been the feature of historical animal geographies, the subjects of animal geography methods, interdisciplinary biogeographies. They have been the mainstay of new work on cosmopolitan ecologies, and in thinking about the links between political ecology and nonrepresentational theory.

=== Wild cats ===
Wild cat species have also been featured in recent scholarship in animal geography, including Gullo, Lassiter and Wolch and Collard's work on place-specific relational geographies, use of shared landscapes, and interactions between cougars and people. Doubleday's work on tigers in India and Wilcox's work on jaguars in the Americas also explore socially constructed affective logics and their impacts on conservation priorities across a range of geographies and time periods.

=== Dogs ===
Dogs have featured heavily in animal geography scholarship in recent years. Notable work includes that of Haraway and Instone and Sweeney on human-dog hybridity, and work by Srinivasan on street dogs in India. More recent work examines how walking dogs displaying unwanted behaviour - animals falling short of our collective expectations of what a ‘pet’ should be - extracts a potentially considerable "social and emotional toll" for dog owners.

== See also ==
- Biogeography
- Fauna
- Phytogeography
- Zoology
