= Evolution of emotion =

Study of the evolution of emotions

Evolutionary explanations for the existence of discrete emotions such as fear and joy are one of many theoretical approaches to understanding the ontological nature of emotions. Historically, evolutionary theoretical approaches to emotions, including basic emotion theory, have postulated that certain so-called basic emotions (usually fear, joy, anger, disgust, and sadness) have evolved over human phylogeny to serve specific functions (for example, fear alerts a human mind of imminent danger). So-called basic emotions are often linked causally to subcortical structures of the brain, including the amygdala (pronounced uh-MIG-duh-luh). In other words, subcortical structures have historically been considered the causes of emotions, while neocortical (neo- meaning new, recent and cortical meaning relating to cortex) structures, especially the prefrontal cortex, are almost invariably understood as the cause of reason. Those ideas about the brain are old; they're traceable at least to Aristotle and were later incorporated into Paul MacLean's mistaken model of brain organization, the "triune brain." These ideas have led to the widespread, erroneous belief that animal brains, including human brains, evolve in a linear fashion, such that, along the course of evolution, new layers of brain tissue are stacked upon older layers of brain tissue, much like the formation of sedimentary rocks. Brain evolution is a lot more complicated than that.

Evolution and natural selection has been applied to the study of human communication, mainly by Charles Darwin in his 1872 work, The Expression of the Emotions in Man and Animals. Darwin researched the expression of emotions in an effort to support his materialist theory of unguided evolution. He proposed that much like other traits found in animals, emotions apparently also evolved and were adapted over time. His work looked at not only facial expressions in animals and specifically humans, but attempted to point out parallels between behaviors in humans and other animals.

Evolutionary psychologists consider human emotions to be best adapted to the life our ancestors led in nomadic foraging bands.

== Origins ==
Darwin's original plan was to include his findings about expression of emotions in a chapter of his work, The Descent of Man, and Selection in Relation to Sex (Darwin, 1871) but found that he had enough material for a whole book. It was based on observations, both those around him and of people in many parts of the world. One important observation he made was that even in individuals who were born blind, body and facial expressions displayed are similar to those of anyone else. The ideas found in his book on universality of emotions were intended to go against Sir Charles Bell's 1844 claim that human facial muscles were created to give them the unique ability to express emotions. The main purpose of Darwin's work was to support the theory of evolution by demonstrating that emotions in humans and other animals are similar. Most of the similarities he found were between species closely related, but he found some similarities between distantly related species as well. He proposed the idea that emotional states are adaptive, and therefore only those able to express certain emotions passed on their characteristics.

=== Darwin's principles ===
In the 1872 work, Darwin proposed three principles. The first of the three is the "principle of serviceable habits", which he defined as we have certain habits or we perform different actions in certain states of mind, which get associated when that state of mind is induced, even when its not needed then. He used as an example contracting of eyebrows (furrowing the brow), which he noted is serviceable to prevent too much light from entering the eyes. He also said that the raising of eyebrows serves to increase the field of vision. He cited examples of people attempting to remember something and raising their brows, as though they could "see" what they were trying to remember.

The second of the principles is that of antithesis. While some habits are serviceable, Darwin proposed that some actions or habits are carried out merely because they are opposite in nature to a serviceable habit, but are not serviceable themselves. Shrugging of the shoulders is an example Darwin used of antithesis, because it has no service. Shoulder shrugging is a passive expression, and very opposite of a confident or aggressive expression.

The third of the principles is expressive habits, or nervous discharge from the nervous system. This principle proposes that some habits are performed because of a build-up to the nervous system, which causes a discharge of the excitement. Examples include foot and finger tapping, as well as vocal expressions and expressions of anger. Darwin noted that many animals rarely make noises, even when in pain, but under extreme circumstances they vocalize in response to pain and fear.

== Research ==
Paul Ekman is most noted in this field for conducting research involving facial expressions of emotions. His work provided data to back up Darwin's ideas about universality of facial expressions, even across cultures. He conducted research by showing photographs exhibiting expressions of basic emotion to people and asking them to identify what emotion was being expressed. In 1971, Ekman and Wallace Friesen presented to people in a preliterate culture a story involving a certain emotion, along with photographs of specific facial expressions. The photographs had been previously used in studies using subjects from Western cultures. When asked to choose, from two or three photographs, the emotion being expressed in the story, the preliterate subjects' choices matched those of the Western subjects most of the time. These results indicated that certain expressions are universally associated with particular emotions, even in instances in which the people had little or no exposure to Western culture. The only emotions the preliterate people found hard to distinguish between were fear and surprise. Ekman noted that while universal expressions do not necessarily prove Darwin's theory that they evolved, they do provide strong evidence of the possibility. He mentioned the similarities between human expressions and those of other primates, as well as an overall universality of certain expressions to back up Darwin's ideas. The expressions of emotion that Ekman noted as most universal based on research are: anger, fear, disgust, sadness, and enjoyment.

A common view is that facial expressions initially served a non-communicative adaptive function. Thus, the widened eyes in the facial expression of fear have been shown to increase the visual field and the speed of moving the eyes which helps finding and following threats. The wrinkled nose and mouth of the facial expression of disgust limit the intake of foul-smelling and possibly dangerous air and particles. Later, such reactions, which could be observed by other members of the group, increasingly become more distinctive and exaggerated in order to fulfill a primarily socially communicative function. This communicative function can dramatically or subtly influence the behavior of other members in the group. Thus, rhesus monkeys or human infants can learn to fear potential dangers based on only the facial expressions of fear of other group members or parents. Seeing fear expressions increases the tendency for flight responses while seeing anger expressions increases the tendency for fight responses. Classical conditioning studies have found that it is easier to create a pairing between a negative stimulant and anger/fear expressions than between a negative stimulant and a happiness expression. Cross-cultural studies and studies on the congenitally blind have found that these groups display the same expressions of shame and pride in situations related to social status. These expressions have clear similarities to displays of submission and dominance by other primates. Humans viewing expression of pride automatically assign a higher social status to such individuals than to those expressing other emotions.

Expressed emotions and adaptive functions
Expressed emotion	Initial physiological function	Evolved communicative function
Fear	Increased visual field and speed of eye movement from widened eyes. Sensory hypersensitization (e.g. hearing and touch). Substantial adrenal response (e.g. Vomiting and bodily fluid evacuation).	Fight-or-flight (posturing, thanatosis, hostility, etc). Eusocial alerting to potential threats. Appeasement to peer aggressor. Hindered or shutdown learning postures (loops close in favor of survival).
Surprise	Increased visual field from widened eyes, decreased stimulus sharpness. Hormonal shifts (e.g. noradrenaline).	Improved (receptive) learning postures and modified perception filtering.
Disgust	Constriction of head openings reduce dangerous inhalations and ingestions, reduced blood flow and digestion. Nausea and dizziness, vomiting and bodily fluid evacuation.	Warning of dangerous foods (in particular poisons) and stimulus changes. Psychogenic vomiting. Unable to assume learning postures.
Happiness	Vascularization and hormonal rebalancing (e.g. Oxytocin, dopamine, and serotonin shifts). Wide range of physiological signaling (e.g. inarticulate grunts such as laughter).	Absence of threat, Reinforced learning postures. Nurturing.
Sadness	Tears, dysphoria, mirror behavior desensitization, avoidance behavior.	Vision handicapped by tears to show appeasement and evoke juvenile care taking behaviors in vertebrates (engage peer sympathy). Downregulated or shutdown learning postures.
Anger	Primed adrenal responses (pupil dilation, pain desensitization, sweat, gastro-intestinal compartmentalization, hostility)	Warning of impending threats. Dominant posturing. Adversarial learning postures.
Pride	Increased lung volume in preparation for encountering challengers. Arousal.	Increased social status posturing and mating attempts.
Shame/Embarrassment	Reduces and hides vulnerable body areas from potential attacks, arousal downregulation.	Decreased social status posturing and mating attempts. Wish for appeasement.

Robert Zajonc published two reviews in 1989 of the "facial efference theory of emotion", also known as facial feedback theory, which he had first introduced to the scientific literature in an article published in Science in 1985. This theory proposes that the facial musculature of mammals can control the temperature of the base of the brain (in particular the hypothalamus) by varying the degree of forward and backward flow through a vascular network (a so-called rete mirabile). The theory is based on the idea that increasing the temperature of portions of the hypothalamus can produce aggressive behavior, whereas cooling can produce relaxation. Our emotional language has comparable descriptors, such as "hot-head" and "cool-breezy". The theory offers an explanation for the evolution of common facial expressions of emotion in mammals. Little experimental work has been done to extend the theory, however.

Carroll Izard discussed gains and losses associated with the evolution of emotions. He said that discrete emotion experiences emerge in ontogeny before language or conceptual structures that frame the qualia known as discrete emotion feelings are acquired. He noted that in evolution, when humans gained the capability of expressing themselves with language, this contributed greatly to emotional evolution. Not only can humans articulate and share their emotions, they can use their experiences to foresee and take appropriate action in future experiences. He did, however, raise the question of whether or not humans have lost some of their empathy for one another, citing things such as murder and crime against one another as destructive.

Joseph LeDoux focuses much of his research on the emotion fear. Fear can be evoked by two systems in the brain, both involving the thalamus and the amygdala: one old, short and fast, the other more recently evolved, more circuitous and slower. In the older system, sensory information travels directly and quickly from the thalamus to the amygdala where it elicits the autonomic and motor responses we call fear. In the younger system, sensory information travels from the thalamus to the relevant cortical sensory areas (touch to the somatosensory cortex, vision to the visual cortex, etc.) and on to frontal association areas, where appraisal occurs. These frontal areas communicate directly with the amygdala and, in light of appraisal, may reduce or magnify the amygdala's fear response. If you glimpse what looks like a snake, long before your younger frontal areas have had time to determine it is a stick, the old thalamus-amygdala system will have evoked fear. LeDoux hypothesizes that the old fast system persists because a behavioral response at the first hint of danger is of little consequence when mistaken but may mean the difference between life and death when appropriate.

== See also ==
- Animal sexual behaviour § Sex for pleasure
- Empathy § In animals
- Facial expression
- Fear § In animals
- Reward system § Animals vs. humans
- Paul Ekman
- Posture (psychology)
