= Eric Magrane =

American geographer and poet

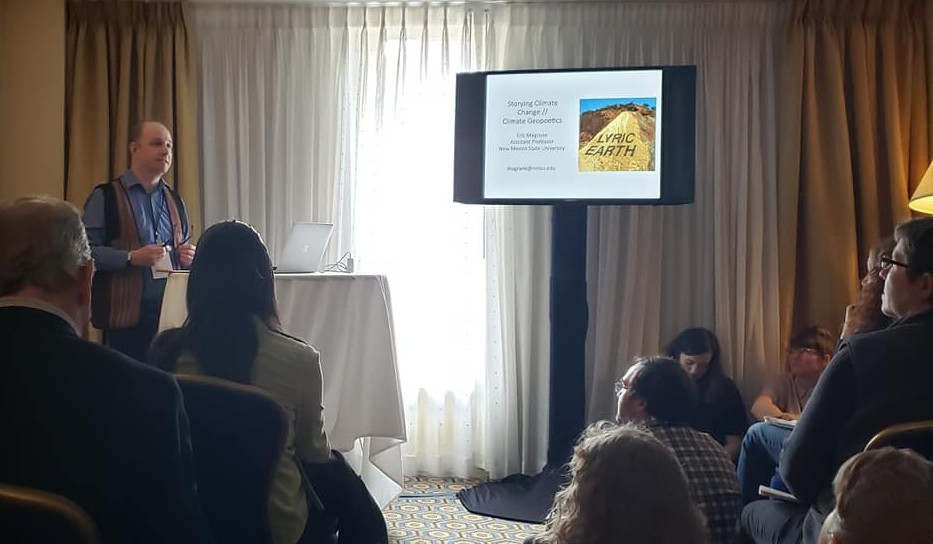
- Eric Magrane presenting Storying Climate Change at the 2019 Association of American Geographers annual conference
- Citizenship: United States of America
- Occupation: Geographer

Academic background
- Education: University of Arizona, Goddard College

Academic work
- Discipline: Geography
- Sub-discipline: Geopoetics
- Institutions: New Mexico State University
- Website: https://ericmagrane.com/

Eric Magrane is a geographer, poet, writer, and assistant professor of geography at New Mexico State University. He has published several poems, peer-reviewed journals, and books. His work is notable in the human geography subfield of geopoetics, both as a contributor and in helping to define the field.

== Education and field ==
Magrane earned their B.A. from Goddard College in 1988. He then moved from New England to Arizona, where he earned both his Masters of Fine Arts in Literature (2001) and Ph.D. in geography (2017) from Arizona State University. His dissertation is titled "Creative Geographies and Environments: Geopoetics in the Anthropocene." Magrane's work ranges from literary to scientific. He focuses on narrative responses and perceptions of the Anthropocene, specifically anthropogenic climate change. He is one of the leading academics in the field of geopoetics.

== Career and publications ==
Magrane worked as a hiking guide in Arizona at Canyon Ranch Health Resorts for nine years between 2003 and 2012 after receiving his Master's Degree. During this time, he published several literary works, performed numerous public poetry readings, and taught courses on poetry and writing at both the University of Arizona Poetry Center and Pima Community College. Magrane has continued to perform public poetry readings throughout his career. While working as a guide, Magrane became interested in geography, ultimately leading to him seeking a geography PhD in 2012 from the University of Arizona. While working on his PhD, he served as a Teaching and Research associate, teaching several classes. In 2017, after Magrane received his PhD, he became a visiting assistant professor at the New Mexico State University Department of geography. In 2018, he took a position as a tenure-track associate professor in the same department.

Magrane's background in creative writing and geography is reflected in his research and publications. The book The Sonoran Desert: A Literary Field Guide which he co-edited, demonstrates this approach by combining a scientific field guide with artistic illustrations and literature about the species represented. This book "harmonizes science and the arts," according to one reviewer. Broadly, his writing focuses on narratives related to the Anthropocene, responses to environmental change, and human perspectives on place. Examples of topics he has had published in peer-reviewed journals include bycatch in the Gulf of California shrimp trawling fishery and anthropogenic climate change.

His background has helped him become a significant figure in the geography subdiscipline of geopoetics. His paper 'Situating geopoetics' appeared in the first issue of the American Association of Geographers journal GeoHumanities and serves as a landmark publication documenting the history of geopolitics, its current status, and possible avenues of future exploration. His paper Climate geopoetics (the earth is a composted poem), published in Dialogues in Human Geography, received several responses, and helped bring attention to geopoetics among mainstream geographers. He co-authored Geopoetics in Practice, a textbook designed to demonstrate the intersection of geography and poetry in a way that academics and lay people can understand.

He serves on the editorial board of the journals Annals of the American Association of Geographers and Terrain.

== Awards and recognition ==
- 2016: Southwest Book Award
- 2016: New Mexico–Arizona Book Award
- 2016: Southwest Books of the Year Top Pick
- 2024: New Mexico State University Early Career Award

== See also ==
- Kenneth White
- Qualitative geography
- Transcript poetry
