= Geopoetics =

Geographic method incorporating poetry

Geopoetics is an interdisciplinary approach that combines elements of geography, poetry, and philosophy to explore the relationship between places, landscapes, and human experience. Geopoetics as a term was coined by Scottish poet Kenneth White in 1979, and his original manifesto and definitions of geopoetics have been expanded upon by researchers and poets in the subsequent decades. Despite this, geopoetics as a concept has been difficult to define clearly.

Geopoetics has been widely employed by critical geography as part of the response to the quantitative revolution in geography, and stresses qualitative approaches. It seeks to bridge the gap between the objective study of physical geography and the subjective, emotional response to landscapes and environments. It is described as harmonizing art and science. In general, poetry can be used as a method for presenting and analyzing data, and geopoetics is in part an outgrowth of this. Within the discipline of geography, poetry can be employed to teach abstract geographic concepts, such as the Four traditions of geography, in the classroom. Geopoetics encourages individuals to engage with the world around them more profoundly and meaningfully, often through creative expressions such as poetry, prose, and art. Geopoetics has gained traction in the 21st century as many geographers seek to incorporate artistic expression into their work and as more artists enter the discipline of geography. While geopoetics can present information in unique ways, analyze phenomena, and express meaning, it can also advocate for potential actions, influence policy, stimulate imagination, and seek to shape potential futures.

== History ==
=== Origins ===
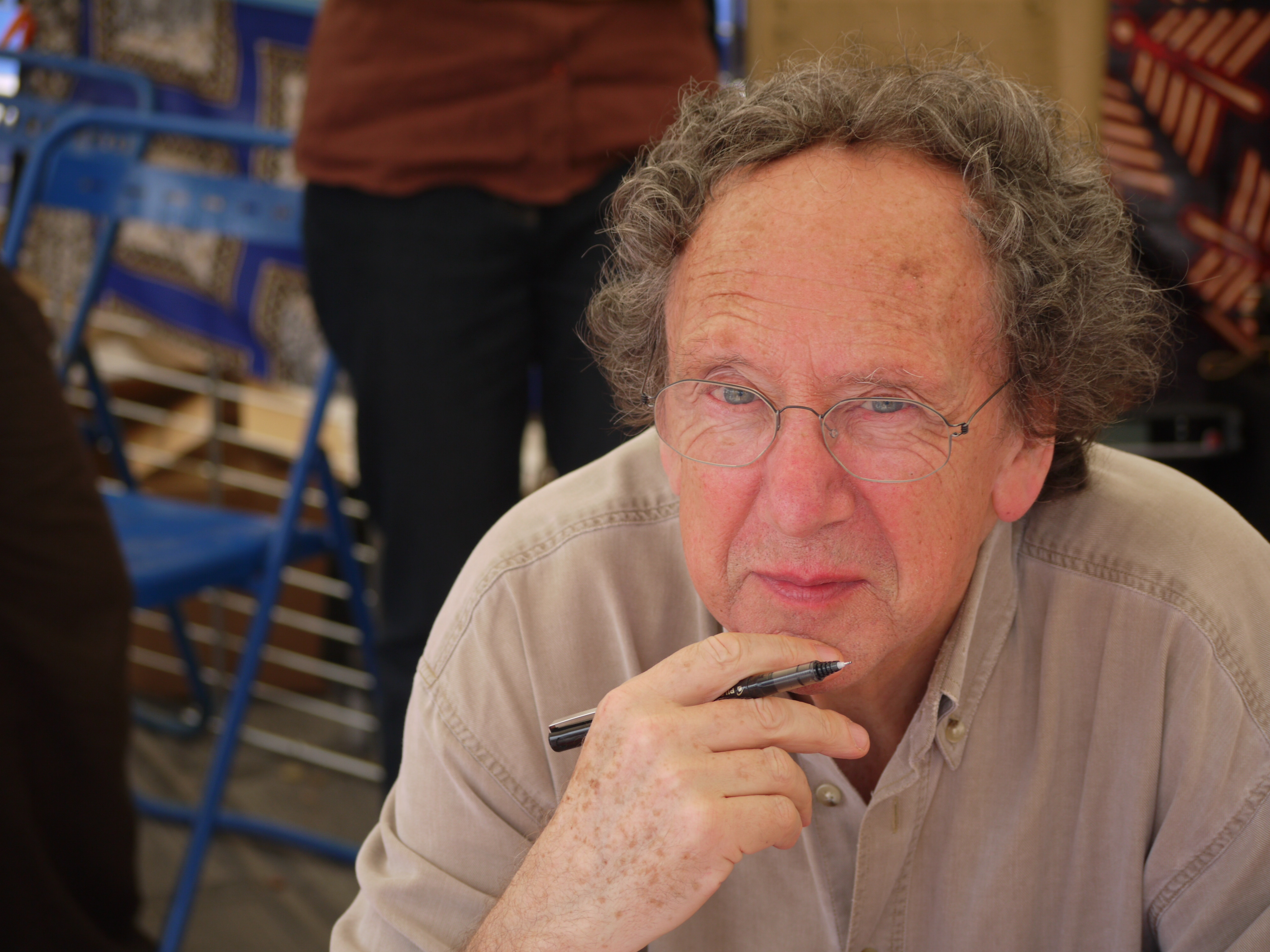
Kenneth White in 2009

The term "geopoetics" was coined by the Scottish poet and writer Kenneth White in the 1970s. White's work was heavily influenced by his experiences traveling and living in various remote and natural landscapes, particularly the Scottish Highlands. His observations and reflections on these places led him to develop the concept of geopoetics to merge the scientific and the artistic in exploring landscapes.

=== Development ===
Geopoetics gained recognition and popularity primarily in academic and literary circles during the late 20th and early 21st centuries. It has been embraced by poets, writers, artists, and scholars worldwide as a way to rethink and reimagine their relationship with the environment. Geopoetics emphasizes the interconnectedness of humans and their surroundings and challenges the traditional separation of the natural world from the cultural and creative realms. Geopoetics has been used to communicate the environmental issues surrounding bycatch in the fishing industry. In one such application, poems were written about non-target species impacted by the shrimp fishing industry to bring attention to the value of these species and illustrate what it is like on a fishing boat. Geopoetics has been employed to communicate information related to anthropogenic climate change.

== Examples ==
Appendix: Wild Hyacinth

"An eye-catcher, she is with a cousin in the Antioch dunes

rock walls, rock slopes—wall flower put her on a postage stamp mark her as endangered by day, by dry soil, freeways, pesticides, frailty, her youth

Range: Monticello Road

Bloom: April–June"

— from the GeoPoetics Poetry Reading at the American Association of Geographers conference in March 2016.,

== Contemporary Relevance ==
Geopoetics is an evolving field of study and artistic expression in the 21st century. It inspires writers, artists, and environmentalists to engage with and reflect upon the environment innovatively. In an era of increasing environmental awareness and concern, geopoetics provides a framework for addressing environmental challenges and fostering a deeper connection to the natural world.

== Notable Figures ==
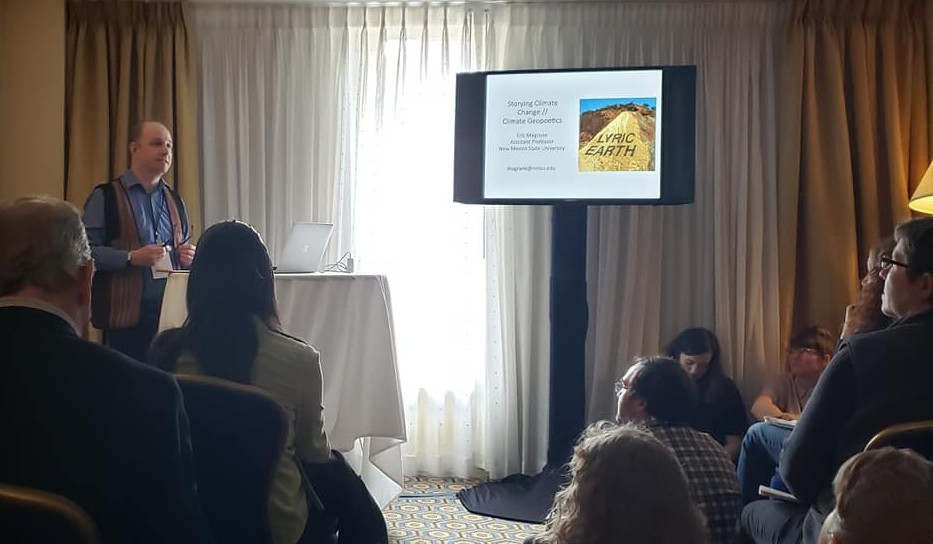
Eric Magrane presenting Storying Climate Change at the 2019 Association of American Geographers annual conference.

- Kenneth White (b. 1936): A Scottish poet, essayist, and geographer, is regarded as the founder of geopoetics.
- Eric Magrane: American geographer and poet who has published significant academic content on geopoetics as a discipline, including peer-reviewed publications and textbooks.
- Gary Snyder: an American poet often associated with the Beat Generation and the San Francisco Renaissance, has explored themes related to nature and geopoetics in his poetry.

== See also ==
- Collaborative mapping
- Counter-mapping
- Geosophy
- Participatory GIS
- Qualitative geography
- Traditional knowledge GIS
- Transcript poetry
