= Qualitative geography =

Subfield of geographic methods

A compound chorochromatic map of Indo-Aryan (Indic) languages in South Asia. The color scheme represents the hierarchical nature of language classification, by grouping similar language families: yellows are Eastern Indic, purples are Dardic, reds are Southern Indic, greens are Western Indic, browns are Northern Indic, and oranges are Central Indic. Maps like these are often referred to as qualitative in the literature.

Qualitative geography is a subfield and methodological approach to geography focusing on nominal data, descriptive information, and the subjective and interpretive aspects of how humans experience and perceive the world. Often, it is concerned with understanding the lived experiences of individuals and groups and the social, cultural, and political contexts in which those experiences occur. Thus, qualitative geography is traditionally placed under the branch of human geography; however, technical geographers are increasingly directing their methods toward interpreting, visualizing, and understanding qualitative datasets, and physical geographers employ nominal qualitative data as well as quanitative. Furthermore, there is increased interest in applying approaches and methods that are generally viewed as more qualitative in nature to physical geography, such as in critical physical geography. While qualitative geography is often viewed as the opposite of quantitative geography, the two sets of techniques are increasingly used to complement each other. Qualitative research can be employed in the scientific process to start the observation process, determine variables to include in research, validate results, and contextualize the results of quantitative research through mixed-methods approaches.

== Approaches ==
Several scientific fields/subfields created or modified and applied specific concepts, theories, methods, principles/laws, techniques/technologies, etc. so to propose specific interdisciplinary approaches for addressing qualitative research-questions of geography. Qualitative geography is the interdisciplinary field of geography gathering these proposed interdisciplinary-approaches from:

- Behavioral geography
- Cognitive geography
- Critical geography
- Cultural geography
- Emotional geography
- Feminist geography
- Geosophy
- Marxist geography
- Social geography
- Ethnography
  - Culture theory
- Time geography

== Concept of place ==
Geography considers place as one of its most significant and complicated concepts, and describing a place is something that qualitative methods are absolutely necessary to accomplish. When referring to human geography, place is a combination of the geographical coordinates of a location, the activities that take place there (past, present, and future), and the interpretations that human individuals and groups assigned to that space. This can be highly intricate because people may have different uses and perceptions of the exact location at different times. Moreover, places are not isolated entities and have complex spatial connections, as geography is interested in how an area is positioned relative to all other locations. Therefore, geography includes all spatial phenomena at a particular site, the various meanings and uses attributed to it, and how it affects and is affected by all other locations on the planet. While quantitative methods can describe spatial coordinates, the concept of place is, in many ways, non-quantifiable. Thus, while quantitative methods are incredibly useful in an understanding of space, qualitative methods are essential.

== Methods ==
Qualitative geography is descriptive rather than numerical or statistical in nature. Qualitative geography involves methods such as ethnography, interviews, and participant observation to gather data and make sense of the complexity and diversity of human geography. It emphasizes the importance of subjectivity, reflexivity, and interpretation in research. Qualitative geography aims to produce rich, detailed accounts of the social and cultural landscapes in which people live. Qualitative research is often exploratory and descriptive, emphasizing the importance of subjectivity, reflexivity, and interpretation. While qualitative methods are often viewed as opposite to quantitative methods, there is an increased emphasis in geography on mixed methods approaches that employ both. Increasingly, technical geographers are exploring GIS methods applied to qualitative datasets.

=== Qualitative cartography ===
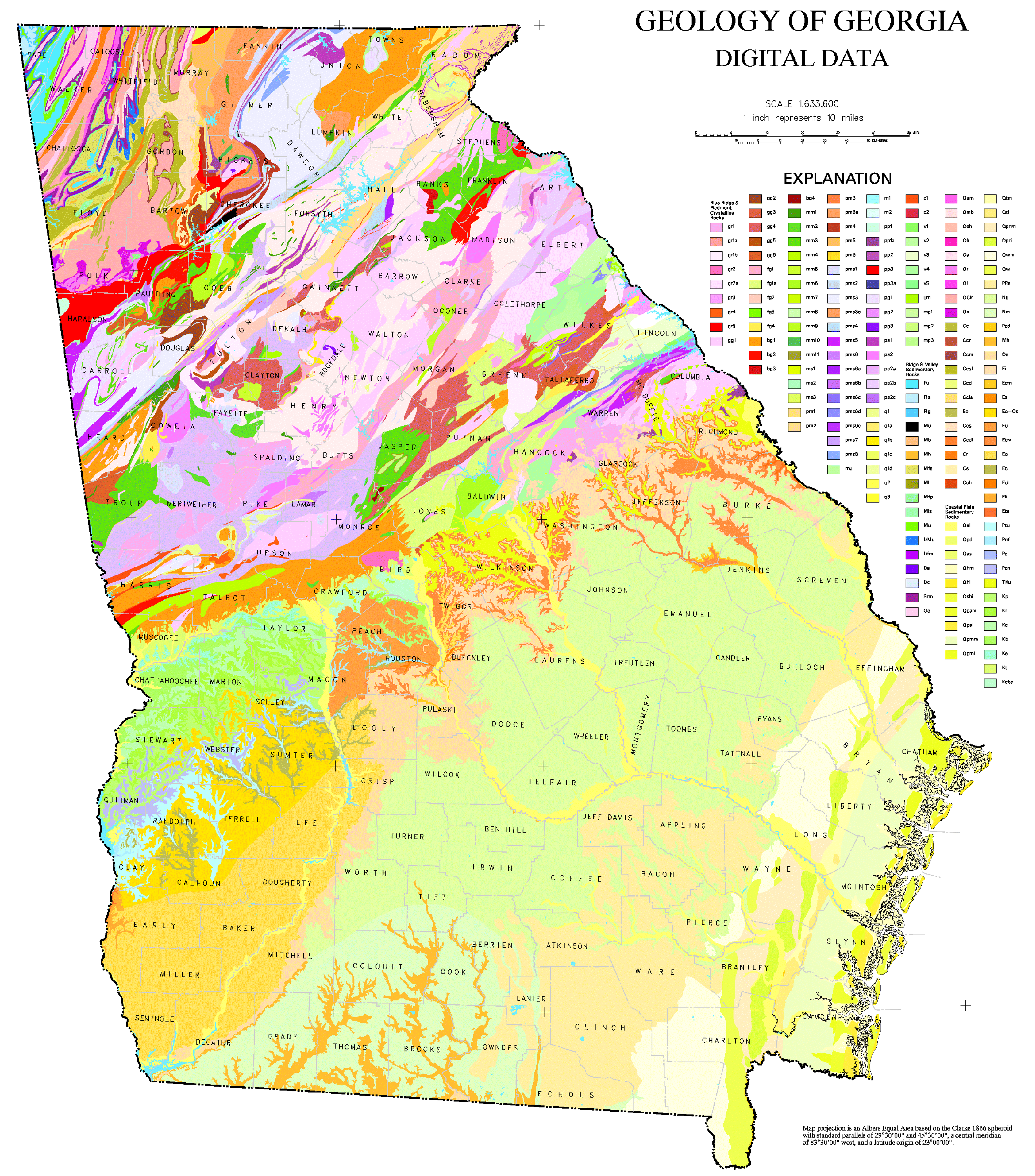
USGS geological map of Georgia that visualizes distinctive geological regions as unique colors using a chorochromatic map. Note that the regions change based on variations in rock type, not preexisting political boundaries.

Qualitative cartography employs many of the same software and techniques as quantitative. It may be employed to inform on map practices, or to visualize perspectives and ideas that are not strictly quantitative in nature. Examples of common qualitative information mapped include Chorochromatic map of nominal data, such as land use and land cover. In such cases, literature suggests using hue, rather than saturation, for displaying qualitative map topics.

Qualitative cartography can be used as art to communicate concepts not necessarily tied to spatial coordinates or to demonstrate the impacts, limitations, and implications of cartography on diverse groups of people.

Qualitative methods are employed by geographers seeking to improve cartographic practices by understanding how subjective cartographic choices impact how data is understood by users.

=== Ethnography ===
Ethnographical research techniques are used by human geographers. In cultural geography, there is a tradition of employing qualitative research techniques, also used in anthropology and sociology. Participant observation and in-depth interviews provide human geographers with qualitative data.

=== Interviews ===
Geographers can employ interviews to gather data and insights from individuals or groups about their experiences, perceptions, and opinions related to geographic phenomena. Interviews can be conducted in various formats, including face-to-face, telephone, online, or written. To employ interviews in research, geographers typically follow a structured or semi-structured format with questions or topics to guide the conversation. These questions elicit specific information about the research topic while allowing participants to share their personal experiences and insights. Geographers also often use open-ended questions to encourage participants to provide more detailed and nuanced responses.

=== Geopoetics ===
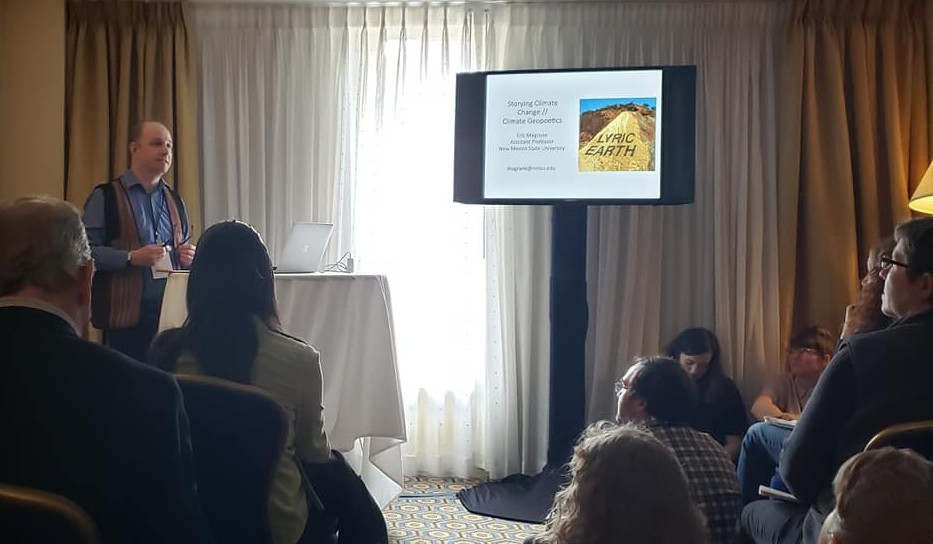
Eric Magrane presenting his work using geopoetics titled Storying Climate Change at the 2019 Association of American Geographers annual conference.

Geopoetics is a discipline that combines geography and poetry to explore, contextualize, and communicate geographic concepts, research, and phenomena. Geopoetics can be viewed as a methodology in itself, but is increasingly used as a mixed methods tool to explain the implications of quantitative geographic research and phenomena. Topics addressed by geopoetics often include impacts of the anthropocene, such as climate change and environmental exploitation.

== Criticisms ==
One of the primary criticisms of qualitative geography is its lack of generalizability. The findings of qualitative geography research are often based on small sample sizes, specific cases, or small-scale phenomena, making it challenging to generalize the results to larger populations or areas or capture larger patterns and trends. The data often rely on the research participants' unique circumstances and experiences, making qualitative research studies challenging to replicate. This makes strictly controlling variables, systematic data collection, and analysis procedures challenging. Finally, qualitative geographic research often relies heavily on the researcher's subjective interpretation of the data, which can introduce potential bias into the study. The researcher's background, experiences, and assumptions can influence their interpretation of the data. Ultimately, these factors of qualitative geographic lead some critics to argue that qualitative research lacks the rigor and objectivity of quantitative analysis. This can limit the applicability of the study to other researchers and policymakers.

== Influential geographers ==
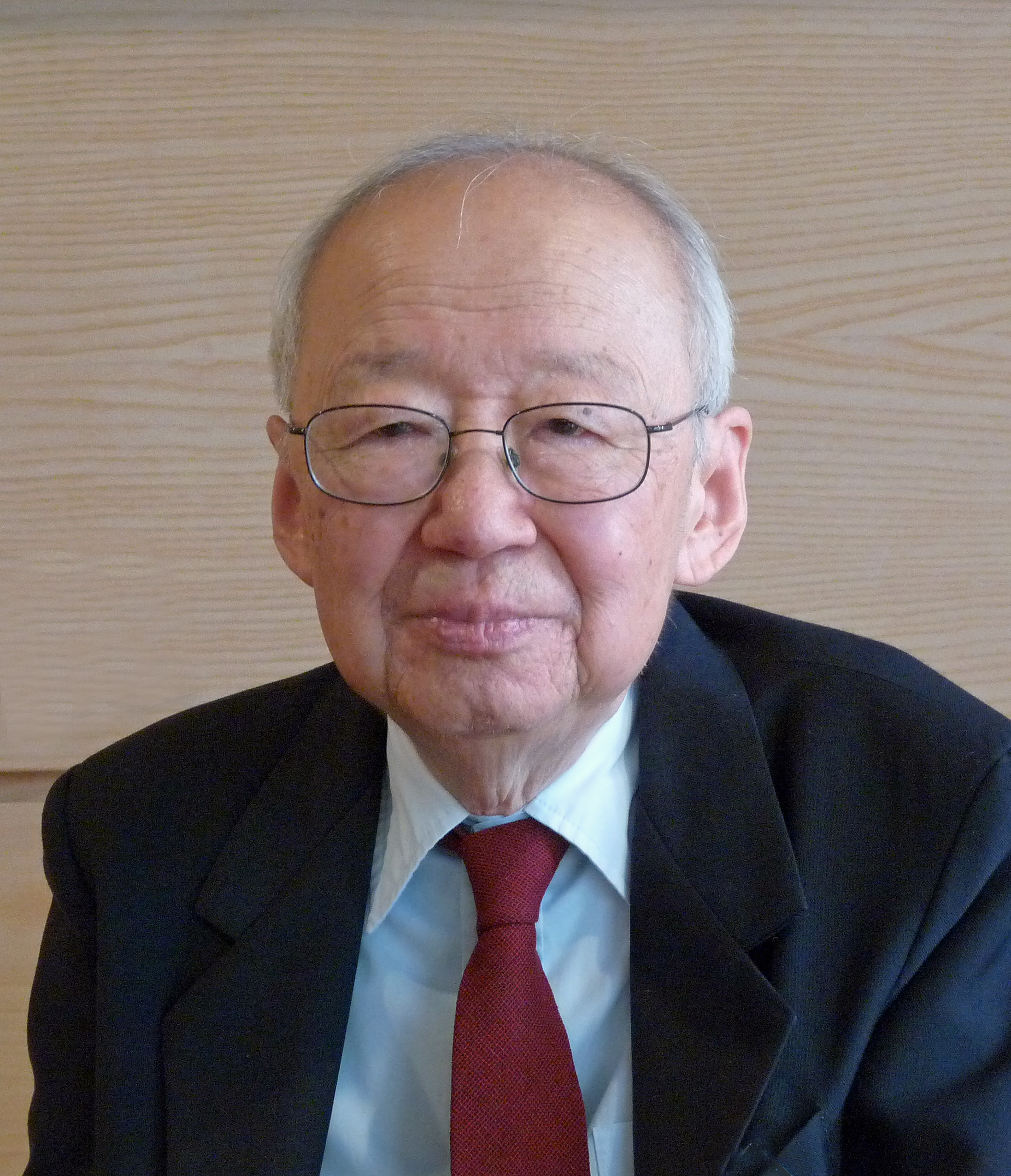
Yi-Fu Tuan in 2012

- Carl O. Sauer (1889–1975) – cultural geographer.
- David Harvey (born 1935) – Marxist geographer and author of theories on spatial and urban geography, winner of the Vautrin Lud Prize.
- Doreen Massey (1944–2016) – scholar in the space and places of globalization and its pluralities; winner of the Vautrin Lud Prize.
- Edward Soja (1940–2015) – worked on regional development, planning, and governance and coined the terms Synekism and Postmetropolis; winner of the Vautrin Lud Prize.
- Eric Magrane – Influential geographer in the geographic subfield of geopoetics.
- Mei-Po Kwan (born 1962) - geographer that coined the Uncertain geographic context problem and the neighborhood effect averaging problem.
- Nigel Thrift (born 1949) – originator of non-representational theory.
- Paul Vidal de La Blache (1845–1918) – founder of the French school of geopolitics, wrote the principles of human geography.
- Walter Christaller (1893–1969) – human geographer and inventor of Central place theory.
- Yi-Fu Tuan (1930–2022) – Chinese-American scholar credited with starting Humanistic Geography as a discipline.

== Publications ==
Main category: Geography Journals

- Annals of the American Association of Geographers
- Antipode
- Concepts and Techniques in Modern Geography
- Dialogues in Human Geography
- Geographia Technica
- Geographical Review
- Geographical Bulletin
- GeoHumanities
- Journal of Rural Studies
- Journal of Maps
- National Geographic
- Progress in Human Geography

== See also ==
- Collaborative mapping
- Counter-mapping
- Historical GIS
- Map communication model
- Methodological dualism
- Online qualitative research
- Participatory GIS
- Qualitative psychological research
- Quantitative history
- Traditional knowledge GIS
