= Mateo Gutiérrez =

Spanish geomorphologist

Mateo Gutiérrez Elorza (1941–2023) was a Spanish geomorphologist, researcher and university professor.

== Career ==
During his career he explored several topics such as karst systems, periglacial geomorphology, neotectonics, geoarchaeology, gully erosion, geomorphological response to extreme rainfall events and the relationship of geomorphology and Holocene climate cycles. He also produced and edited several books on geomorphology in Spanish. His publications include Geomorfología climática (2001) "a work well received in Spanish-speaking countries, and subsequently translated into English". In 2010 his book Geomorfología (2008) was described as "indispensable for specialists in geomorphology" and predicted to be a future "classic" of geomorphology. He was internationally regarded as a leader and crucial person in the development of geomorphology in Spain. Also, Gutiérrez has been internationally recognized for his efforts to reconcile the disciplines of geomorphology and geography.

Gutiérrez was a member of the Spanish Royal Academy of Sciences from 2013 until his death in 2023.
