= Technical geography =

Study of spatial information

Technical geography is the branch of geography that involves using, studying, and creating tools to obtain, analyze, interpret, understand, and communicate spatial information. The spatial data types a technical geographer employs may vary widely, including human and physical geography topics, with the common thread being the techniques and philosophies employed. To accomplish this, technical geographers often create their own software or scripts, which can then be applied more broadly by others. They may also explore applying techniques developed for one application to another unrelated topic, such as applying Kriging, originally developed for mining, to disciplines as diverse as real-estate prices. Further, a technical geographer may explore the relationship between the spatial technology and the end users to improve upon the technology and better understand the impact of the technology on human behavior.

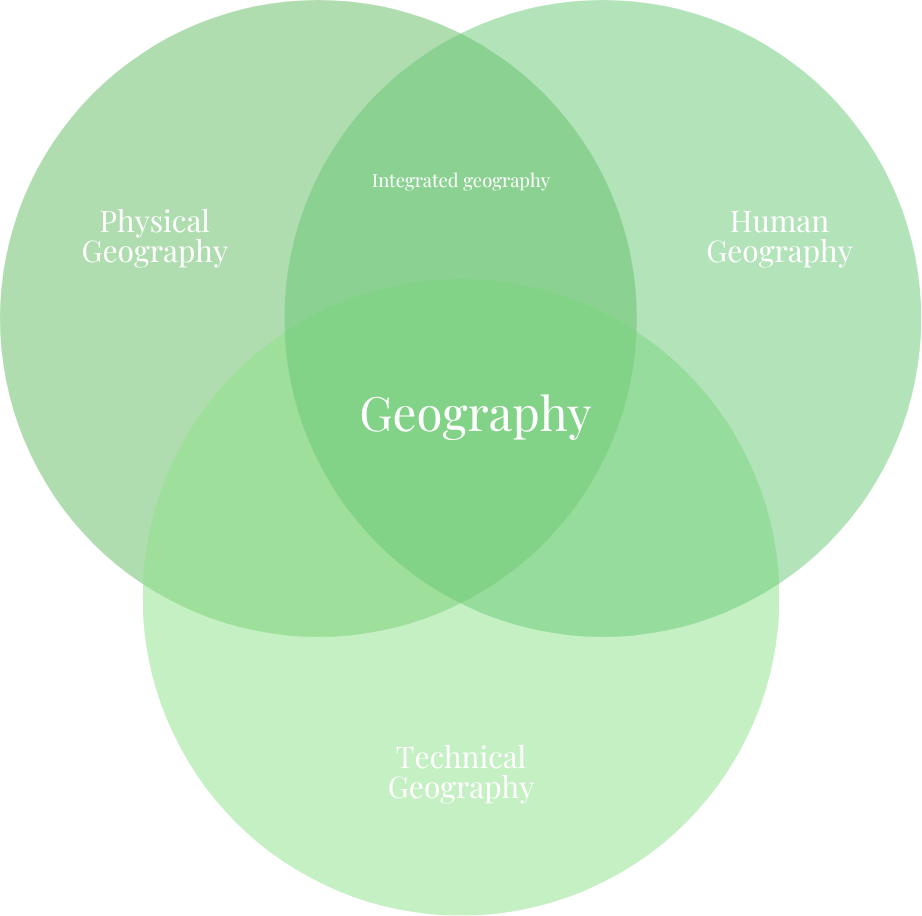
The relationship between the three branches of geography

The other branches of geography, most commonly limited to human geography and physical geography, make extensive use of technical geographies concepts and techniques. Nevertheless, the methods and theory are distinct, and a technical geographer may be more concerned with the technological and theoretical concepts than the nature of the data. In teaching technical geography, instructors often rely on examples from human and physical geography to explain theoretical concepts. While technical geography mostly works with quantitative data, the techniques and technology can be applied to qualitative geography, differentiating it from quantitative geography. Within the branch of technical geography are the major and overlapping subbranches of geographic information science, geomatics, and geoinformatics.

== Fundamentals ==
Technical geography is highly theoretical and focuses on developing and testing methods and technologies for handling spatial-temporal data. These technologies are then applied to datasets and problems within the branches of both human and physical geography. Historically, technical geography was focused on cartography and globe-making. Today, while technical geographers still develop and make maps, the Information Age has pushed the development of information management techniques to handle spatial data and support decision-makers. To this end, technical geographers often adapt technology and techniques from other disciplines to spatial problems rather than create original innovations, such as using computers to aid in cartography. They also explore adapting techniques developed for one area of geography to another, such as kriging, created for estimating gold ore distributions but now applied to topics such as real estate appraisal. Technical geography today is theoretically grounded in information theory, or the study of mathematical laws that govern information systems.

=== Core concepts ===
Several concepts in technical geography are considered central attributes of the discipline. In one paper, autocorrelation and frequency are listed as concepts on which technical geography is based. Central to technical geography are the technologies surrounding cartography and map production, which are only possible through cartographic generalization. More than just reducing the overall level of information, cartographic generalization helps discover patterns and trends in data that underlie many techniques and technologies employed and investigated by technical geographers.

==== Autocorrelation ====
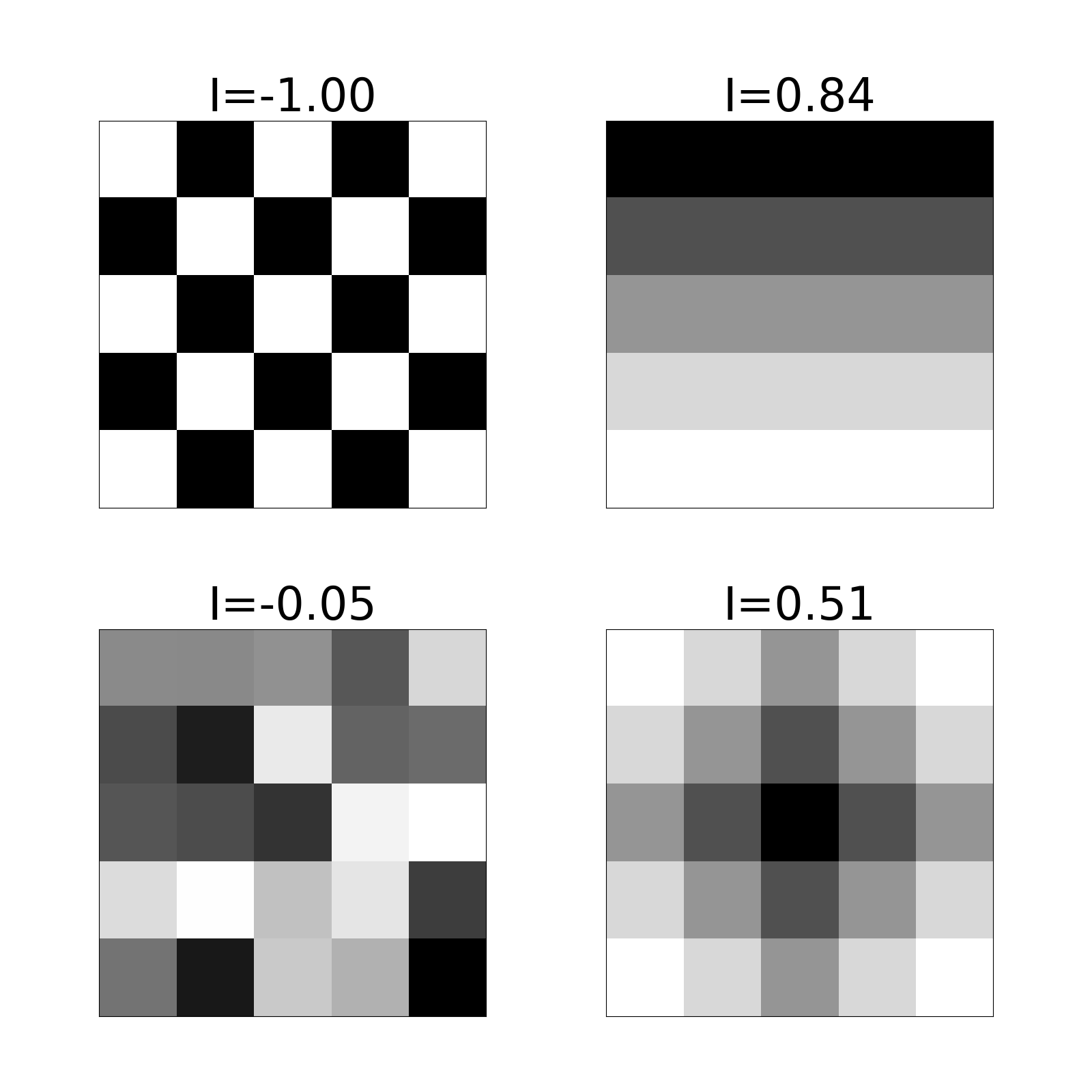
Moran's I statistic computed for different spatial patterns. Using 'rook' neighbors for each grid cell, setting $w_{ij}=1$ for neighbours $j$ of $i$ and then row normalizing the weight matrix. The top left shows an anticorrelation, yielding a negative I. The top right shows a spatial gradient giving a large positive I. The bottom left shows random data giving a value of I near 0 (or $-1/(N-1) \simeq -0.04$). Bottom right shows an 'ink blot' or spreading pattern with positive autocorrelation.

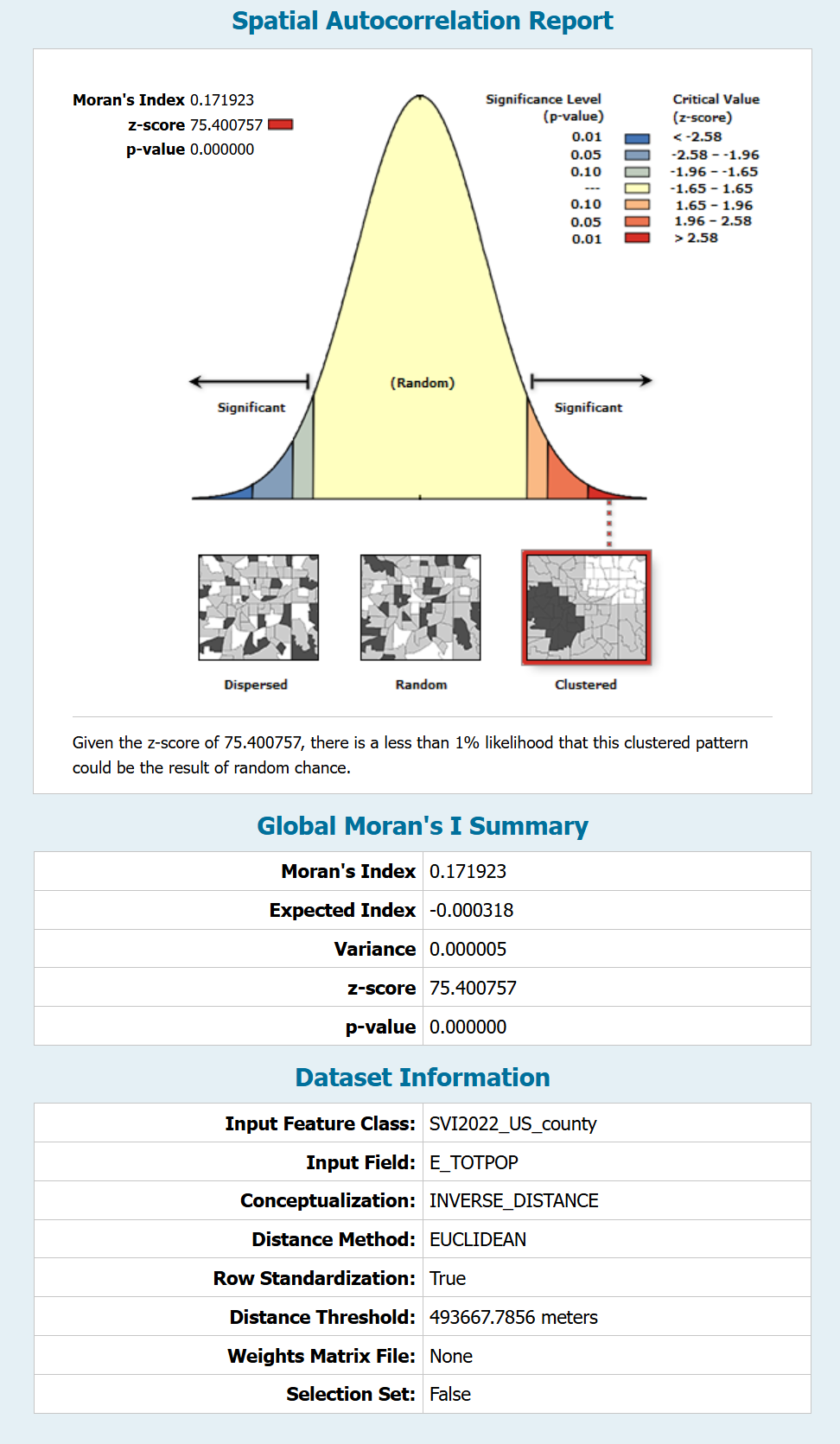
Spatial Autocorrelation Report generated by ArcGIS Pro for 2022 U.S. county population calculated using Global Moran's I.

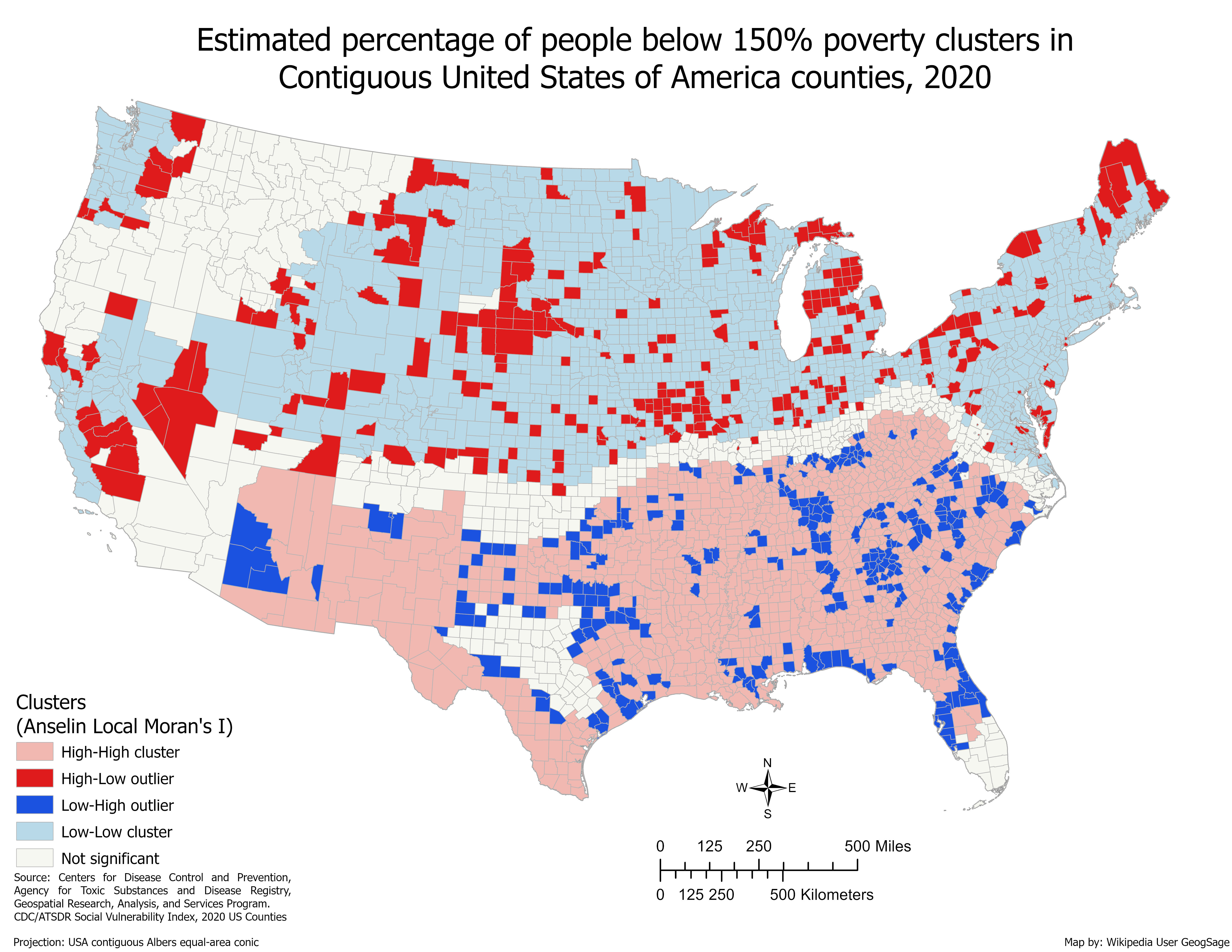
Clusters of the estimated percent of people in poverty by county in the contiguous United States in 2020 calculated using Anselin Local Moran's I.

Spatial autocorrelation examples

Autocorrelation is a statistical measure used to assess the degree to which a given data set is correlated with itself over different time intervals or spatial distances. In essence, it quantifies the similarity between observations as a function of the time lag or spatial distance between them. Autocorrelation can be positive (indicating that similar values cluster together) or negative (indicating that dissimilar values are near each other). Spatial autocorrelation involves the correlation of a variable with itself across different spatial locations. Temporal autocorrelation involves the correlation of a signal with a delayed copy of itself over successive time intervals. Autocorrelation is the foundation of Tobler's first law of geography. Spatial autocorrelation is measured with tools such as Moran's I or Getis–Ord statistics.

Autocorrelation is fundamental to technical geography because it provides critical insights into the spatial and temporal structure of geographical data. It enhances the ability to model, analyze, and interpret spatial patterns and relationships, supporting various applications from environmental monitoring and urban planning to resource management and public health. By understanding and leveraging autocorrelation, geographers can make more informed decisions, improve the accuracy of their analyses, and contribute to solving real-world geographical problems. The techniques and technologies used to leverage this understanding are a core focus of technical geography.

==== Frequency ====
In statistics, frequency refers to the number of occurrences of a particular event or value within a dataset. When dealing with spatial and temporal datasets, the concept of frequency can be applied to understand how often certain events or values occur across different locations (spatial) or over time (temporal). Spatial datasets contain data points that are associated with specific geographic locations, and frequency in spatial datasets can be used to analyze patterns and distributions across different areas. Temporal datasets involve data points that are associated with specific time points, and frequency in temporal datasets helps analyze trends and patterns over time. Analyzing how the frequency of events changes across both space and time can reveal dynamic patterns. Spatial and temporal frequency are core concepts in technical geography because they are fundamental to understanding and analyzing geographic phenomena. Geography is inherently concerned with the distribution and dynamics of features across space and over time, and technical geography researches and develops the techniques to deal with this data.

==== Cartographic generalization ====
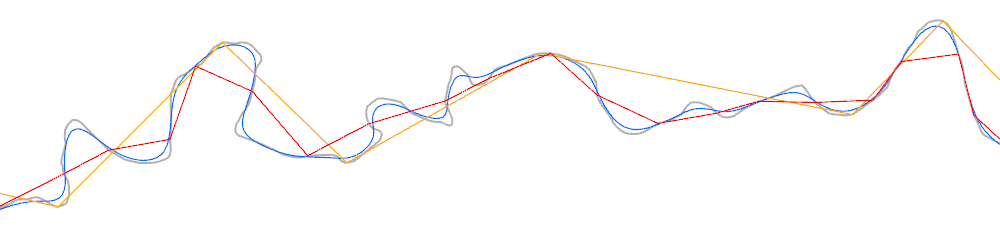
Comparison of several common line generalization algorithms. Gray: original line (394 vertices), orange: 1973 Douglas-Peucker simplification (11 vertices), blue: 2002 PAEK smoothing (483 vertices), red: 2004 Zhou-Jones simplification (31 vertices). All were run with the same tolerance parameters.

Cartographic generalization is the process of simplifying the representation of geographical information on maps, making complex data more understandable and useful for specific purposes or scales. This process involves selectively reducing feature detail to prevent clutter and ensure the map communicates the intended information effectively. The need for generalization arises because maps often depict large areas and scales, where including every detail is impractical and can overwhelm the map reader. The primary goal of cartographic generalization is to balance detail with readability, ensuring that the map serves its intended purpose without sacrificing essential information. By placing data in a spatial context, even though it is generalized, cartographic generalization creates additional information by revealing patterns and trends in the data.

Effective generalization requires a deep understanding of the map's use case, the audience's needs, and the geographical context. Technological advancements, such as the World Wide Web (WWW), Geographic information systems (GIS), and information theory have greatly aided cartographers in generalizing maps more efficiently and consistently. These tools can apply generalization rules systematically, ensuring high-quality outputs even as data volume increases. Cartographic generalization is foundational in technical geography because it ensures that maps are functional, readable, and tailored to their intended use. It balances the need for detail with the practical limitations of scale and medium, enhancing the effectiveness of maps as tools for communication, analysis, and decision-making.

=== Laws of geography ===
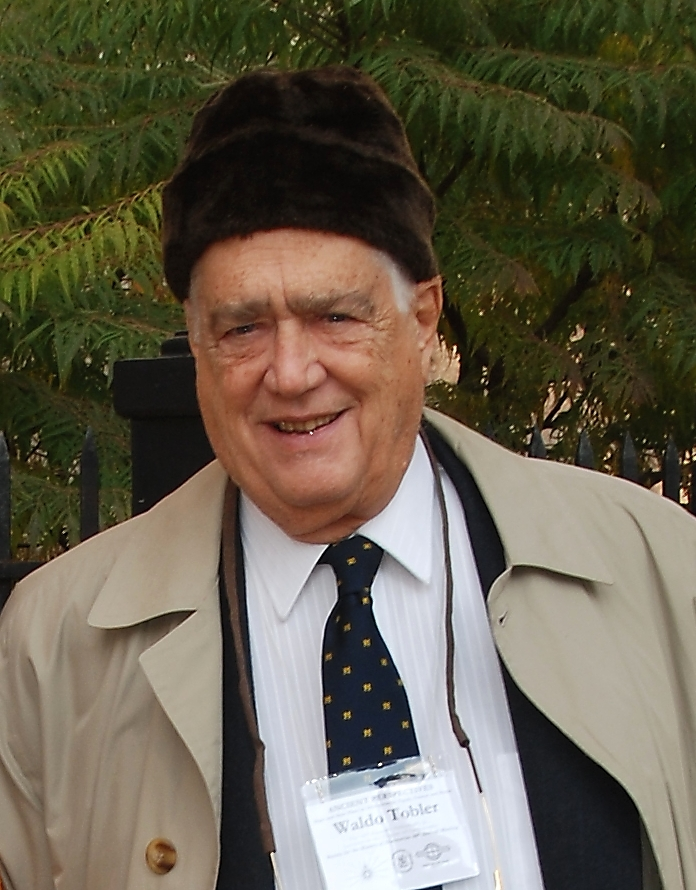
Waldo Tobler, originator of Tobler's first and second law of geography

The quantitative revolution is primarily credited with shifting descriptive, or idiographic, geography to an empirical law-making, or nomothetic, geography. The first of these laws was proposed by Waldo Tobler in a 1970 paper, and more have been proposed since. Some geographers argue against the idea that laws in geography are necessary or even valid. These criticisms have been addressed by Tobler and others. Examples of these laws include Tobler's first law of geography, Tobler's second law of geography, and Arbia's law of geography. French geographer Ionel Haidu noted Tobler's first law of geography, and the associated concept of spatial autocorrelation, as central concepts to technical geography.

== History ==
=== Early history ===
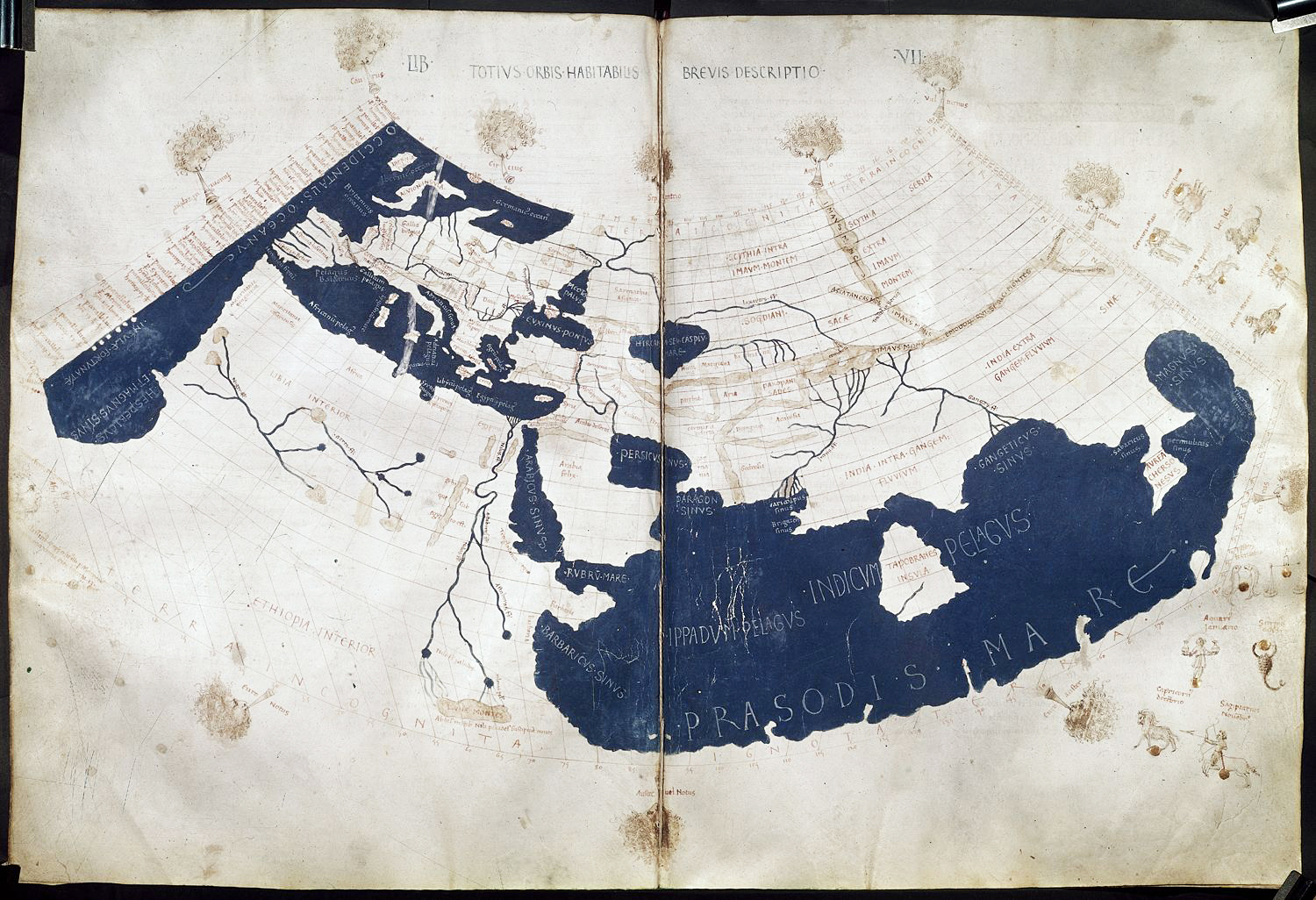
Ptolemy's world map, reconstituted from Ptolemy's Geography (c. 150) in the 15th century

Technical geography as a distinct term in the English language within the discipline of geography dates back at least as far as 1739 to Geography Reform'd, an anonymous book published by English printer Edward Cave at St John's Gate, Clerkenwell. (Note: While Cave published the "Geography reformed: a new system of general geography, according to an accurate analysis of the science in four parts", how much he wrote or edited is unclear. Other authors are not given within the text.) The original authorship is unknown, but researchers believe it appears similar to the work of an anonymous scholar known under the pen names of either "John Green" or "Bradock Mead", both of whom are thought to be the same person. The second edition of the book, republished under the new title of Geography Reformed in 1749, was identical to the first edition except for its title and original preface, which was altered for the new edition. It is divided into four parts, one of which was named "containing technical geography", which focused on both globes and maps, including concepts of cartographic design, and projection. One author described the publication as being "more concerned with the construction of accurate maps (and globes) than with the descriptions that would accompany them." In this book, the author chose to use the term "technical geography" rather than "practical geography" to clarify that the branch is distinct in theory and methods. Geography Reformed defines technical geography with the following:

The Description confider'd as to Form is of three Sorts; The first exhibits the Earth, by a Draught or Delineation; the second by Tables, or Registers; and the third by Treties or Discourse. Hence Technical Geography may be divided into Representatory, Synoptical, and Explanatory.

When the term technical geography first entered the English lexicon is difficult to determine. Technical geography, as a concept, extends across cultures, with techniques dating back to the origins of cartography, surveying, and remote sensing. Technical geography, as a term, is more than place-name recollection and toponymy; it involves spatial relationships between points and theory. Eratosthenes has been called the "founder of mathematical geography", and his activities are described as "little different from what we expect of a technical geographer." Within the "Ptolemaic tradition" of geography started by Ptolemy, scholars have identified distinct "technical elements" in "Ptolemaic cartographic theory" such as map projection, lines of latitude and longitude, coordinates, grids, scales, and the theory of astronomically defined climates. Islamic geographers later adopted these technical elements when Ptolmey's book, Geographia, was translated into Arabic in the ninth century, often mixing them with elements of traditional Islamic cartography. For example, the Kitab al-Buldan, written by Ibn al-Faqih between 902 and 903 C.E., was described by Henri Massé as "technical geography [including] themes of adab."

=== 19th century ===
By the late 1800s, the term "technical geography" was in use to some capacity in American public education and academia. For example, an article in the 1889 edition of the journal School and Home Education stated that "we never hear teachers questioning whether technical geography shall be taught in the schools" and defined the term "technical" to mean "especially appropriate to any art or science." An 1890 publication advertised that the 1891 International Geographical Congress at Berne would have five divisions in its program, with the first being technical geography listing topics like mathematical geography, geodesy, and cartography as examples of content within this division.

=== 20th century ===
==== Early 20th century ====
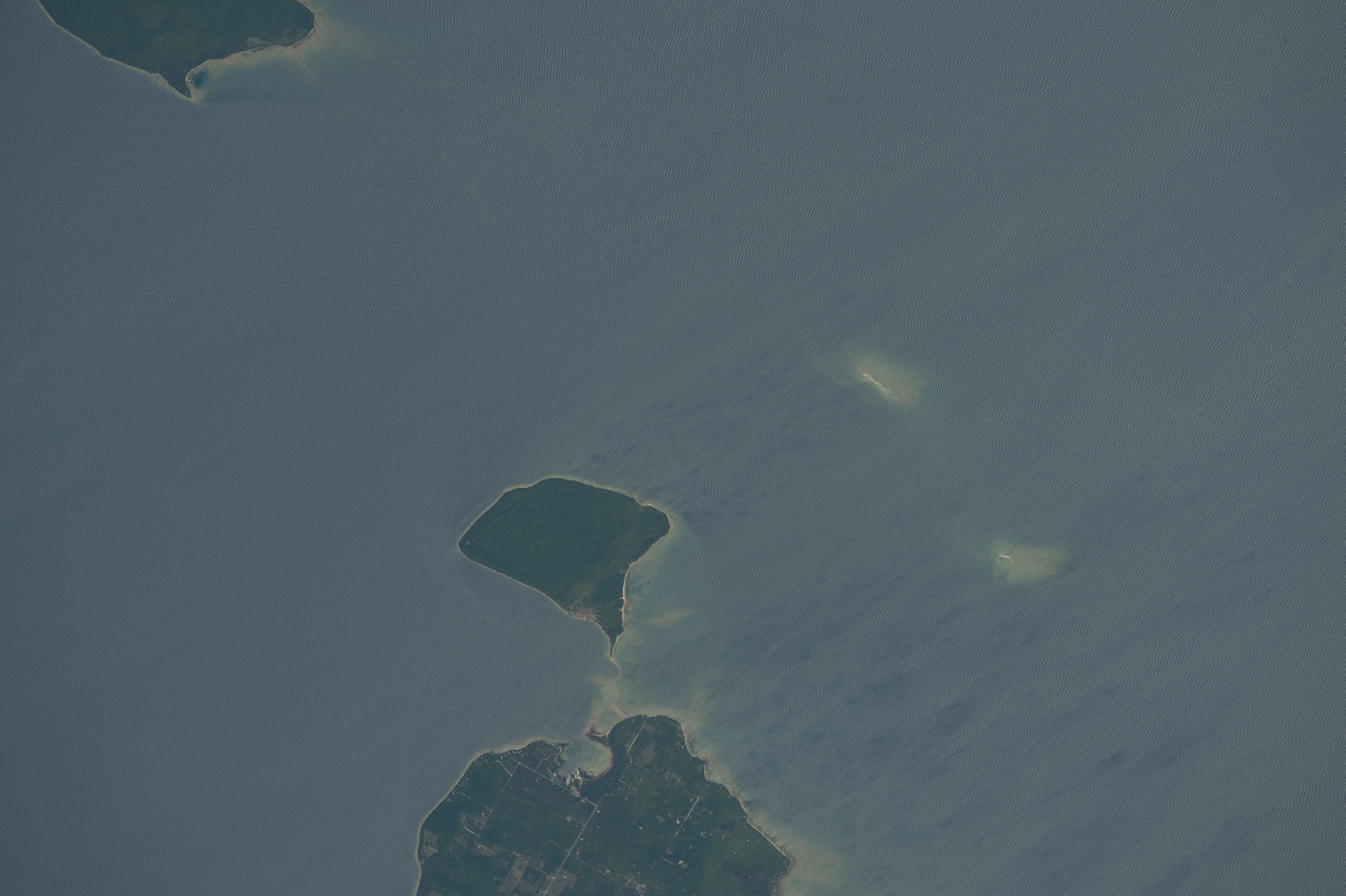
A territorial dispute over the islands in the Rock Island passage between Wisconsin and Michigan in the 1930s resulted in a boundary defined without technical geography.

In 1902, geodesy was suggested as a discipline supporting technical geography by supplying the "backbone, that main axis of indisputable values from which our network of triangulations may spread during the first steps in geographical map-making." In 1908, geography professor George D. Hubbard included technical geography alongside regional geography, physical geography, and general research as courses that should be taught in U.S. university geography departments. Hubbard specifies that technical geography refers to topics such as "mathematical or astronomical geography", as well as cartography. A 1910 publication in the Bulletin of the American Geographical Society introduced the concept of "scientific geography" and discussed employing the scientific method to geographic concepts. This publication proposed how a field of scientific geography could be organized, and specified that "Phytogeography", "Zoogeography", and "Anthropogeography" could be areas where scientific principles could be applied. While this publication did not use the term technical geography in its description, several later publications explicitly link scientific and technical geography. By 1917, technical geography was included among courses taught at some British schools, alongside mathematics, chemistry, and other natural sciences. (Note: The 1917 English review article is unclear on what was included in these British technical geography courses.) As techniques and concepts in technical geography advanced, geographers began to lament the lack of understanding and use of more advanced geographic concepts in society and law. Specifically, this became an issue during the 1930s Michigan-Wisconsin boundary case in the Supreme Court of the United States, where the border was not defined with specific technical geographic concepts. During the 1940s, Oregon State University began focusing on technical geography as part of an applied geography program.

==== Quantitative revolution ====
Technical geography differentiated more clearly during the quantitative revolution in the 1950s and 1960s. Before this, the techniques and methods of handling spatial information were primarily focused on supporting human or physical geography, rather than a subject of study itself. World War II, which saw the extensive use of cartography and aerial photography, revolutionized these techniques and brought a new focus on their benefits. In the years before the quantitative revolution, geography was generally fragmented and focused on descriptive approaches, and many United States universities were eliminating geography departments around the country. To address this, geographers began to debate the merits of more scientific, methods-based approaches to the discipline and to advocate for the benefits these methods had for other technical courses. Some, such as the preeminent cartographer George Jenks, went as far as to suggest that cartography should be a separate academic discipline from geography entirely, even if only at a few academic institutions. This approach was shunned by more traditional geographers, who viewed it as a deviation from how geographers had always viewed and interacted with maps. While the best approach to the technical aspect of geography was heavily debated among geographers, geography departments at universities across the United States began to teach a more scientific approach to geography.

==== 20th century technologies ====
The 20th century saw the rapid emergence of technologies such as computers, satellites, and the corresponding software to operate them. These technologies rapidly changed how geographers operated, and significant effort went into considering how best to incorporate them into the discipline. With these technologies came new disciplines and terms like analytical cartography, which focus on mathematical modeling and theoretical implications of cartography. These terms often compete and overlap with each other and often originate in separate countries, such as geographic information science in the United States, geomatics in France, and geoinformatics in Sweden. Three major technologies, remote sensing (RS), Geographic information systems (GIS), and the global positioning system (GPS) are highlighted as examples of technologies characterizing technical geography. During the late 20th century, geography departments in North America rapidly changed their curricula to incorporate these technologies, as students associated technical geography courses with better jobs after graduation. This shift pushed geography from liberal arts towards a more applied curriculum.

==== New subdisciplines ====
During the quantitative revolution, several new subdisciplines arose from within the field of technical geography. These include quantitative geography, geomatics, geoinformatics, and geographic information science. These terms all overlap to some degree, but at least one study indicates they differ substantially enough to continue using. The proliferation of these new terms may have been detrimental to their popularity, and it has been suggested that they were possibly created carelessly or hastily. This has led to some confusion, and properly defining the areas covered by each term is an active field of research. One paper by Artur Krawczyk on the topic stated the following:

With the appearance of the next new technologies, immediately, new proposals of new sciences, new subdisciplines, appear. Many authors with great ease announce the origination of a new science, frequently not caring for the proper justification of its name definition. The old definitions, developed in the context of previous technological conditions, remain in the shadow of new technologies, and are not modernised. The lack of specific terminological conditions, determined boundaries, or scopes of such definition use, encourages one to define the next terms, and the next science and research disciplines.

==== Emergence of critical geography ====
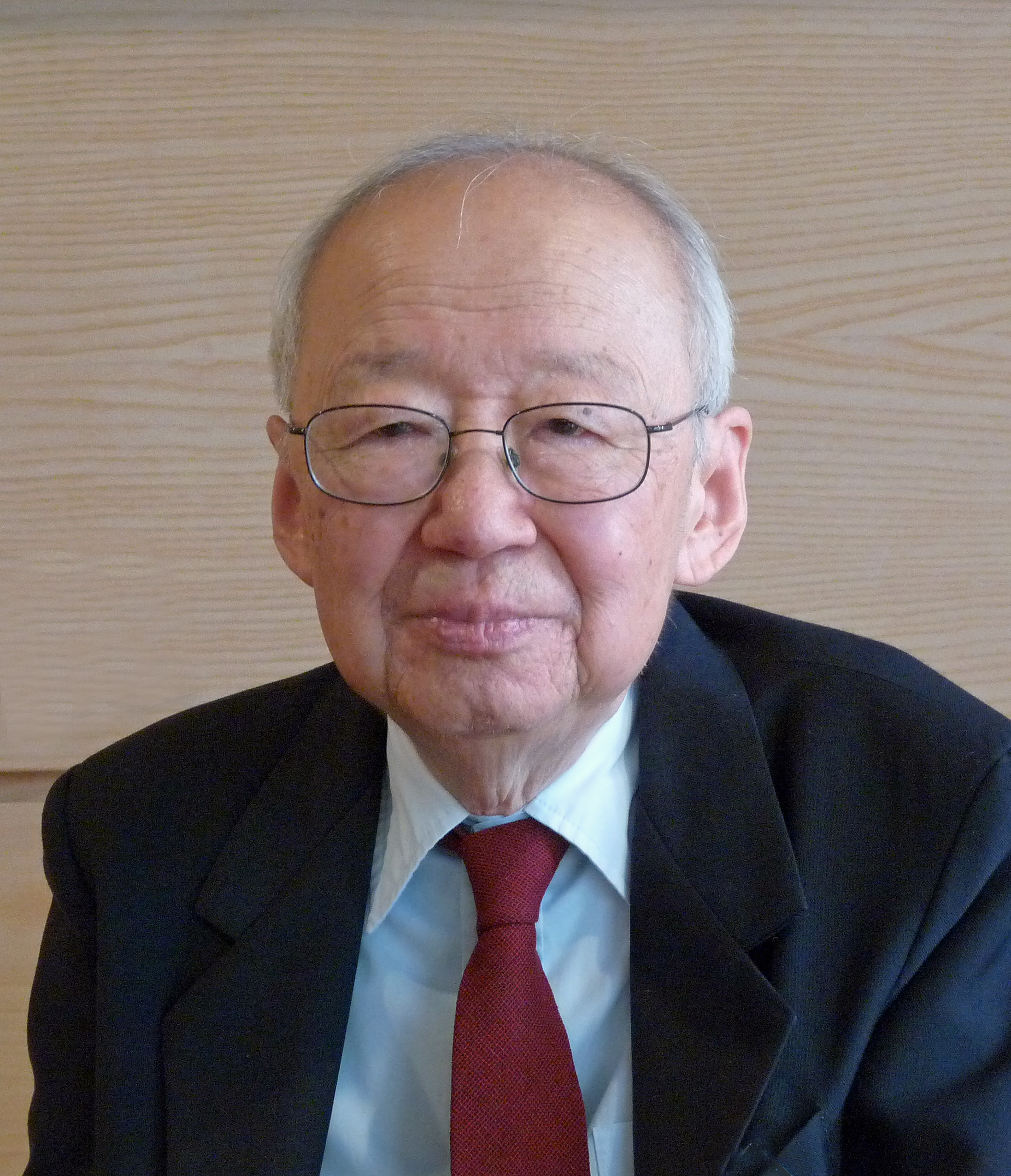
Yi-Fu Tuan, geographer who foregrounded the importance of language in the making of place.

In Cave's discussion of technical geography in Geography Reformed (1749), critical geography was considered an important part of correcting errors in maps and other products to improve models of the world. In the 1970s, critical geography took on the framework of critical theory and Marxist philosophy, and became an umbrella uniting various theoretical frameworks in geography, including Marxist geography, feminist geography, and radical geography (a branch of geography that advocates that geographic research should focus on social issues transforming society). These frameworks were advanced mostly by human geographers, leading to an observed gap between human and physical geographers. In response to the ideas and philosophies advanced during the quantitative revolution, particularly positivism and the emphasis on quantitative methods, the term critical geography was applied to ideological and theoretical criticisms of the methods and ideas of technical geographers. Other geographers, such as Yi-Fu Tuan, criticized the quantitative geography for moving away from the abstract, unquantifiable aspects of place that are essential to the understanding of geography.

In the history of geography since the quantitative revolution, theorists from critical geography are often viewed as in confrontation with those of technical and quantitative geography. Some, such as Peter Gould, argued that these criticisms were largely due to the difficulty in learning the emerging novel technologies. Some geographers, including Stewart Fotheringham, argue that many of the early criticisms of quantitative methods have been addressed with advances in technology, and persist due to ignorance of quantitative geography. Geographer William Graf noted that some physical geographers suspect several of the philosophies underlying critical geography are "fundamentally anti-scientific".

=== 21st century ===
As new technologies and methods applied by geographers, such as spatial analysis, cartography/GIS, remote sensing, and GPS, became widely adopted across disciplines, concern grew among geographers that non-geographers in other disciplines might become better at using them than geographers. In response to this, in 2006, the peer-reviewed journal Geographia Technica was established to serve as an outlet for research employing quantitative, technical, and scientific methods within geography. In a 2016 paper within this journal, Ionel Haidu stated:

The risk is that non-geographers mastering these methods analyze the spatiotemporal data and information better than the geographers. That is why the need to deal with competition induced by other sciences claiming the geographic space as their subject of study and research becomes a serious challenge for geographers. Geographers need to test and adapt to the new methods, models and procedures and implement them in all fields and development trends of Geography. By these also, Technical Geography as a new line of research and professional training becomes a necessity.

Technical geography, as a concept, re-emerges to correct the historical trend in geography of adapting rather than developing new methods, technologies, and techniques for conducting geographic research, encouraging trained geographers to pursue this line of inquiry. While the use of the term "technical geography" itself has been debated since at least the 1700s, concepts within technical geography are often separated from the rest of geography when organizing and categorizing subfields in the discipline. Terms such as "techniques of geographic analysis", "geographic information technology", are used synonymously with the term within textbooks.

==== Critical Geographic Information Science ====
Critical Geographic Information Science emerged during the early 2000s from the debates between critical human geographers and GIScientists. After listening to critiques from critical human geographers, GIScientists began to "straddle the fence" and incorporate social and feminist theory, and use qualitative methods such as public participation GIS. The Encyclopedia of Geography describes the result as a "creative blend of human and technical geography that has the potential to uniquely shape GIS and obliquely influence other information sciences." Critical Geographic Information Science has had limited adoption outside academic geography.

==== Geographic information science and technology body of knowledge ====
As technology such as GIS began to dominate geography departments, the need to develop new curricula to teach the fundamental concepts became apparent. In response to this, in 2006, the UCGIS published Geographic Information Science and Technology Body of Knowledge (GISTBoK), building on the "Model curricula" of the mid 90s. The GISTBoK is designed to inform curriculum teaching GIS and other geospatial technologies. This book is noted as having expanded the term "GIScience" to "GIScience and technology" (GIS&T).

==== UNESCO Encyclopedia of Life Support Systems ====
In 2009, UNESCO Encyclopedia of Life Support Systems (EOLSS) employed the term technical geography to organize their literature related to geography, establishing a three-branch model of technical, human, and physical geography, referring to human and physical as the primary two. The benefit of this wording is that it is consistent with the other two branches and clearly places the discipline within geography. The categorization of technical geography in the EOLSS as a branch is expanded upon by Ionel Haidu in his 2016 paper "What is technical geography" as being a consequence of cartography shifting from simply producing maps to producing spatial information, influenced by a culmination of information theory and technology like the World Wide Web.

== Sub-branches ==
Technical geography can be divided into many sub-branches, including Geodesign, Geodesy, Geoinformatics, Geographic information science, Geomatics, Spatial analysis, Quantitative geography, and Qualitative geography. There is significant overlap and regional variation to how these terms are employed and organized, however they are considered distinct within the literature.

=== Quantitative geography ===
During the early days of the quantitative revolution, the term quantitative geography emerged as a subdiscipline within technical geography, focusing exclusively on new quantitative methods, such as spatial statistics, time geography (including visualizations such as the space-time prism and continuous transportation modeling approach), and GIS, for handling spatial-temporal data generated by novel technology like GPS and remote sensing. This part of technical geography focuses on spatial statistics and visualizing spatial information, emphasizing quantitative data and the scientific method.

=== Geomatics ===
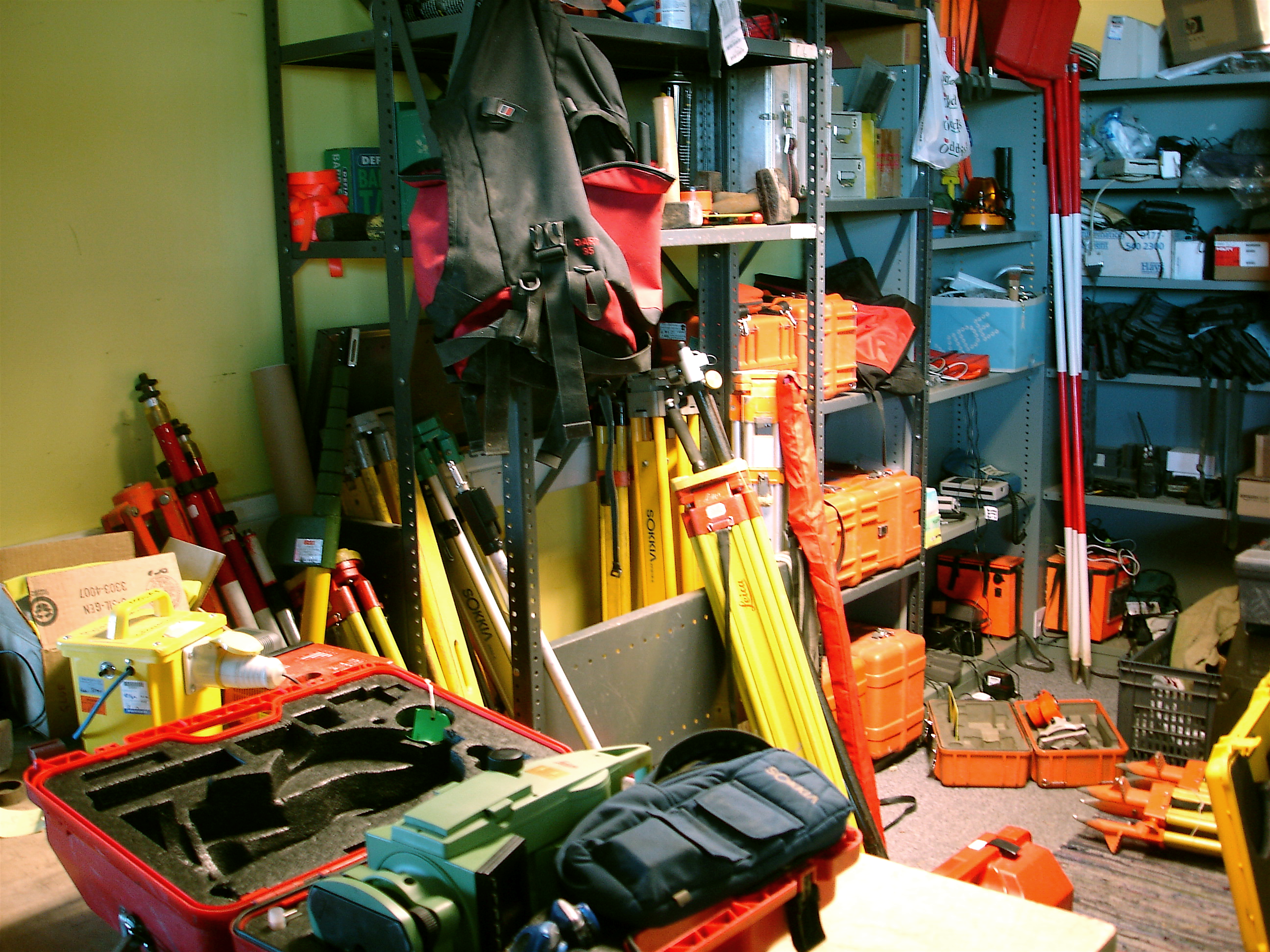
A surveyor's shed showing equipment used for geomatics

In 1960, Bernard Dubuisson coined the term "géomatique" in French. English-speaking Canadians Pierre Gagnon and David Coleman translated the term as "geomatics", which was popularized in Canada through the 1980s and early 1990s. Today, it is defined by the ISO/TC 211, an International Organization for Standardization committee focused on geographic information, as the discipline concerned with handling geographic data or geographic information. In Canada, an effort was made to replace and absorb the term geodesy with geomatics, but this attempt was not successful. Globally, the term "geodesy" is generally considered "immutable". Geomatics was included in the UNESCO Encyclopedia of Life Support Systems under technical geography.

=== Geoinformatics ===
In the late 1980s, the term geoinformatics was coined by Swedish scientist Kjell Samuelson and later defined in the 1990s as the science of integrating spatial data derived from various technologies, such as remote sensing, GPS, and GIS. It was later defined by geographer Michael DeMers to include processing of spatial data through the use of computers. This term has been described as being outside the branch of geography entirely and instead placed fully under the discipline of computer science. In contrast, other sources place it under the branch of technical geography. Sources have noted that there is no universally accepted definition of geoinformatics.

=== Geographic Information Science ===
In the 1990s, the term Geographic Information Science (GIScience) was coined and popularized in the United States by geographer Michael Frank Goodchild to describe "the subset of information science that is about geographic information." GIScience is mentioned explicitly as being separate from quantitative geography, but under the branch of technical geography. In 1995, the University Consortium for Geographic Information Science (UCGIS) was established in the United States to support the field of GIScience, such as the creation of a "model curricula" by geographer Duane Marble to help educators teach GIScience. There has been significant debate around the term GIScience, including questioning if it can be considered a science. Many geographers, including Michael Goodchild, continue to advance the use of the term today.

== Techniques and tools ==
Technical geography employs, researches, and builds upon many techniques and technologies as its primary focus. Other disciplines also use these technologies and may be considered standalone fields in their own right. These include, cartography, geographic information systems, geostatistics, geovisualization, GPS, photogrammetry, remote sensing, and surveying. While technical geographers make extensive use of these tools, the discipline is also concerned about the relationships between how these tools are employed and users, and the impact of the technology on human behavior.

=== Remote sensing ===
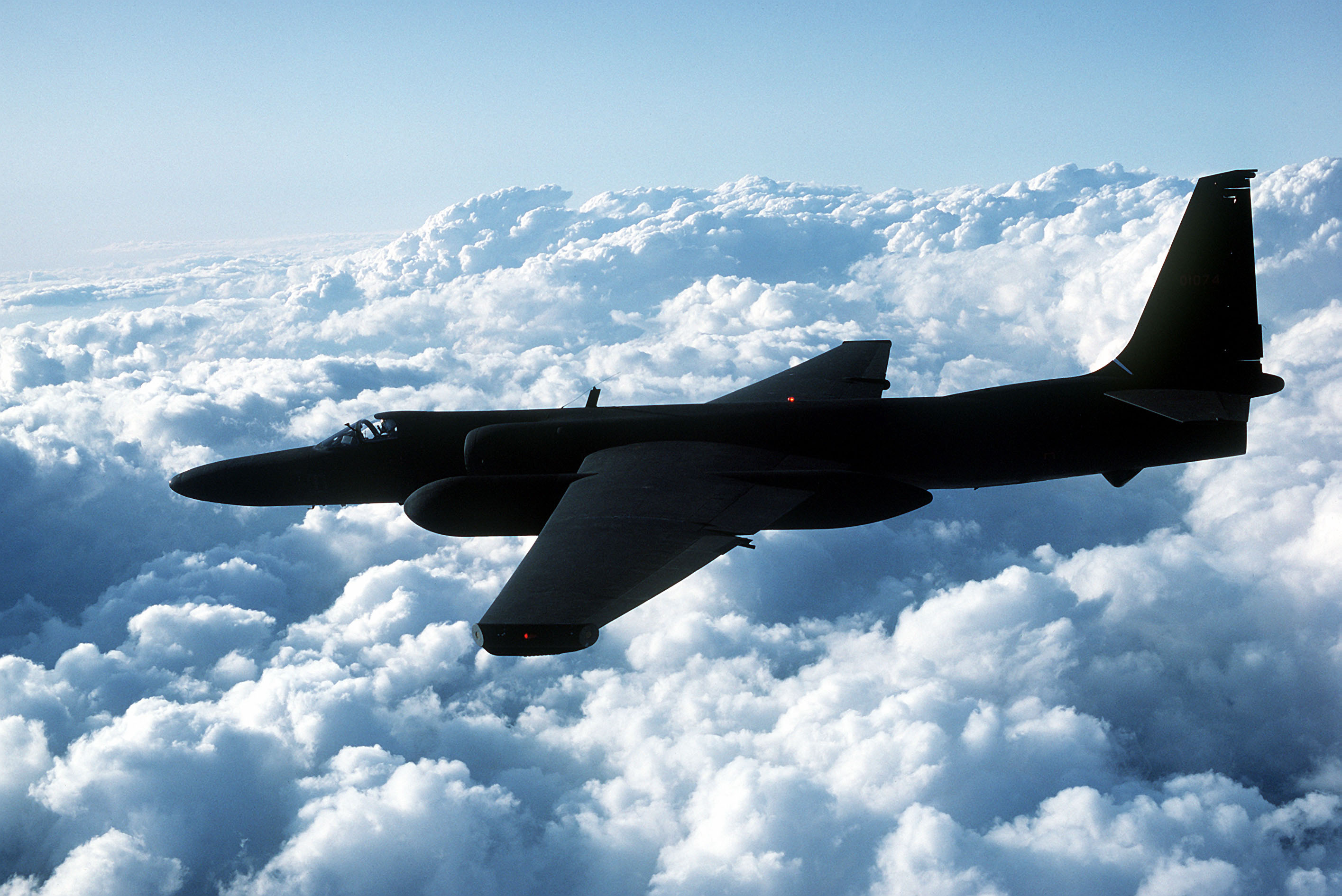
The TR-1 reconnaissance/surveillance aircraft is an example of a Cold War-era platform that advanced remote sensing technology.

Along with computers and GIS, new spatial data sources emerged during the quantitative revolution. Air photo technology was widely used in World War I and, in subsequent years, was applied to civilian endeavors. James W. Bagley's 1941 textbook titled Aerophotography and Aerosurverying stated the following in the first line of its preface:

There is no longer any need to preach for aerial photography—not in the United States—for so widespread has become its use and so great its value that even the farmer who plants his fields in a remote corner of the country knows its value.

Remote sensing technology again advanced rapidly during World War II, and the techniques employed were rapidly assimilated as aids in geographical studies. During the Cold War, advancements in photography, aircraft (such as the Lockheed U-2 and Lockheed SR-71 Blackbird), and rockets only increased the effectiveness of remote sensing techniques. As the technology became available to the general public, geographers were soon overwhelmed with large volumes of satellite and aerial images. New techniques were required to store, process, analyze, and use this new data source, birthing remote sensing scientists. Remote sensing is considered one of the technologies that technical geographers employ to study spatial phenomena.

=== Computer cartography and GIS ===
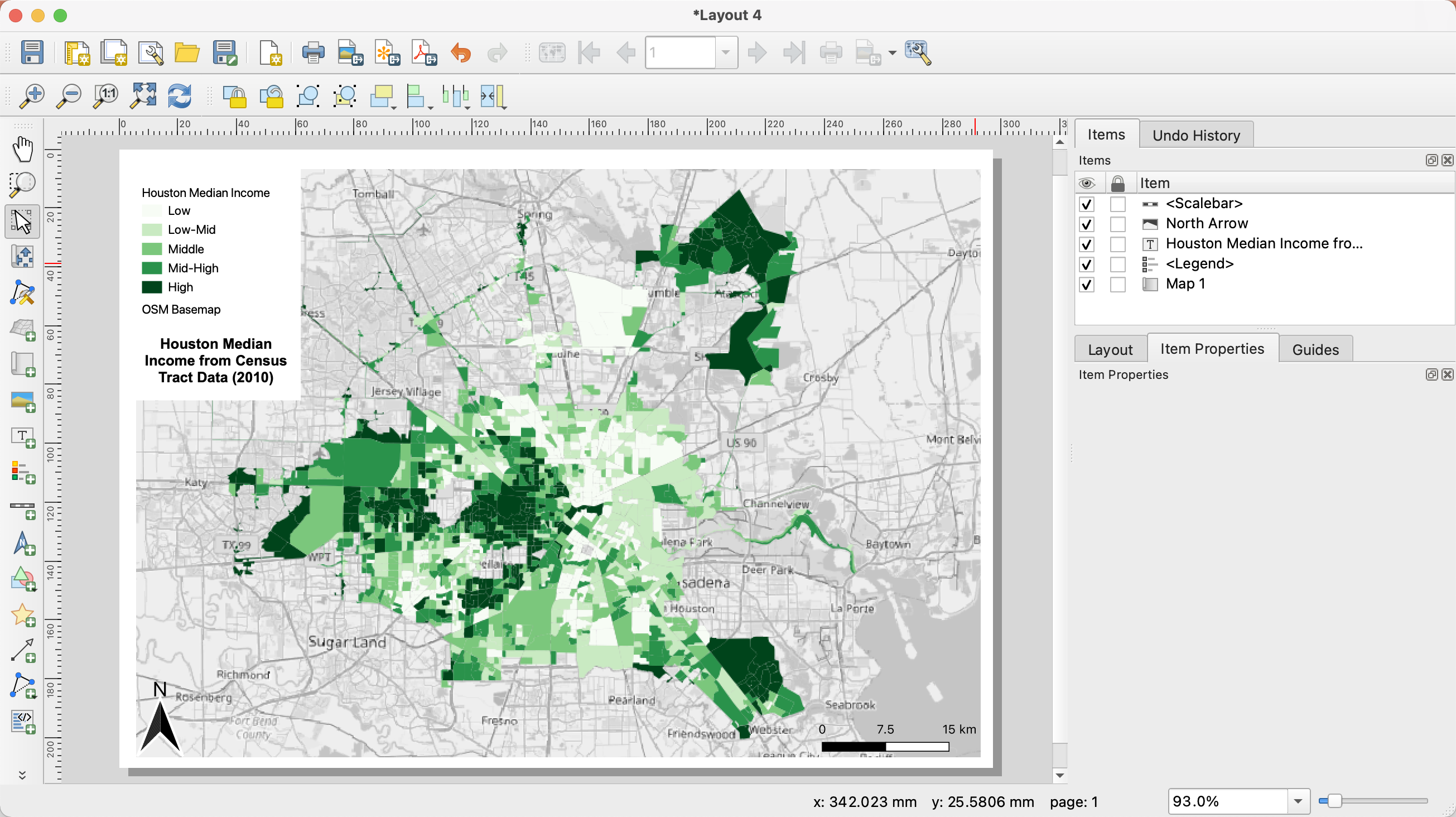
QGIS Interface Screenshot with Map of Median Income in Houston (2010)

Coinciding with the quantitative revolution was the emergence of early computers. The interdisciplinary nature of geography compels geographers to consider developments in other fields, and they tend to observe and adapt technological innovations from other disciplines rather than develop unique technologies for geographic studies. More than a decade after the first computers were developed, Waldo Tobler published the first paper detailing the use of computers in the map-making process titled "Automation and Cartography" in 1959. While novel in terms of application, the process detailed by Tobler did not allow for storing or analyzing of geographic data. As computer technology progressed and better hardware became available, geographers rapidly adopted the technology to create maps. In 1960, Roger Tomlinson created the first geographic information system, which allowed for storing and analysis of spatial data within a computer. These tools revolutionized the discipline of geography by contributing to the positivist scientific approaches to the discipline during the quantitative revolution. In the 1985 book Technological Transition in Cartography, Mark Monmonier speculated that computer cartography facilitated by GIS would largely replace traditional pen and paper cartography. Geographers began to heavily debate the place of GIS in geography, with some rejecting its methods and others heavily advocating for it. In response to critics, British geographer Stan Openshaw stated:

... if geographers reject GIS then it could fundamentally affect the outside world's perception of what geography is all about. Certainly, these external perceptions may well be based on a picture of geography as it once was, but nevertheless they cannot be ignored. "How could they be so foolish as to disown the very core of their discipline?"

With the emergence of GIS, researchers rapidly began exploring methods to apply the technology to various geographic problems. This led some geographers to declare the study of the computer-based methods their own science within geography. GIS serves as the primary technology driving the field of geodesign by enabling real-time feedback in considering geography and landscape with community planning. In academia, students saw GIS as a way to be more employable after graduation, and in response universities began rapidly expanding course offerings, growing from fewer than 10 universities in the U.S. and Canada with a GIS class in the early 1980s, to over 2000 by the early 1990s. GIS is considered one of the primary technologies employed by technical geographers.

=== Global Positioning System ===
GPS constellation system animation

In 1978, the United States military launched the first satellites to enable the modern Global Positioning System (GPS), and the system's full capability was made available to the general public in 2000. This facilitated a level of rapid acquisition of spatial coordinates that previously would have been expensive. Geographers began studying methods and applications for this data. In subsequent years, other countries have launched satellite constellations enabling Satellite navigation, including Russia's GLONASS, China's BeiDou Navigation Satellite System, and the European Union's Galileo navigation satellite system.

== Controversy and criticism ==
=== Ontological ===
Attempts at subdividing geography have often been met with criticism. Geography has a history spanning cultures and thousands of years and is described as a "mother science" from which more specialized disciplines emerge, resulting in a fragmented discipline. Other existing models to subdivide the discipline of geography into categories and focuses, including William Pattison's four traditions of geography, vary dramatically between publications and cultures. While the term technical geography has been put forward as a distinct branch and umbrella for these wider concepts, the terms used to describe the study of spatial information as a distinct category vary. When subdividing the discipline within the literature, similar categories—such as "the Spatial Tradition", "techniques of geographic analysis", "geographic information and analysis", "geographic information technology", "geography methods and techniques", "geographic information technology", "scientific geography", and "quantitative geography"—are used to describe the same, or similar, concepts as technical geography. Some of the discrepancy in terminology is due to different cultures and languages having their own method of organization; for example, the term "information geography" is popular in research from China to describe similar concepts. It is closely associated with and sometimes used interchangeably with, the subfields of geographic information science and geoinformatics. Each term has slightly differing definitions and scopes, and the best word choice has been debated in the literature since at least the 1700s when Cave defended the use of technical geography over practical geography. Despite this, many of these alternative terms or phrases are poorly constructed and do not link the discipline explicitly as a branch of geography in the same way as technical geography. This is an area of active scholarly debate, and any word choice will inevitably be met with criticism by others using a different model. Other discrepancies involve some sources describing techniques employed by technical geographers as standalone fields, such as cartography and remote sensing.

More controversially, others deny the idea that the thought and techniques of geography constitute a new branch. This argument asserts that geography must be applied and, therefore, must focus on some subset of human or physical geography. They also argue that there is not enough well-established peer-reviewed literature to back the term as a new branch.

=== Gender bias ===
Some have brought allegations that the culture in technical geography has introduced gender bias into geography departments, as the discipline is disproportionately practiced by men and seen by some as more masculine. Nadine Schuurman states that while there is not one reason for this discrepancy, it may be related to the broader perception of science as a "masculine domain" and the perception that the tools employed by technical geographers are part of the military-industrial complex.

== See also ==
- Areography (geography of Mars) – Delineation and characterization of Martian regions
- History of cartography – Evolution of the art and science of mapmaking
- Map communication model
- Neogeography – Amateur-focused geography
- Planetary science – Science of planets and planetary systems
- Technical communication – Field of communication of technical information
  - Technical drawing – Creation of standards and the technical drawings
  - Technical writing – Type of written communication
