= Synopsis =

A synopsis (pl.: synopses) is a brief summary of the major points of a subject or written work or story, either as prose or as a table; an abridgment or condensation of a work.

Synopsis or synopsys may also refer to:

- Video synopsis, an approach to create a short video summary of a long video
- Transcript poetry, a data collection method for qualitative research
- Synopsis (album) 2024 album by Japanese boy band Kis-My-Ft2
- "Synopsis", Song by Glaive on the 2021 EP All Dogs Go To Heaven
- A gospel harmony in the form of a table with one column for each gospel.

== See also ==
- Synoptic Gospels, the gospels of Matthew, Mark, and Luke
- Synopsys, an American software company
- Synoptic (disambiguation)
- Synopsia (disambiguation)
