= Philosophy of geography =

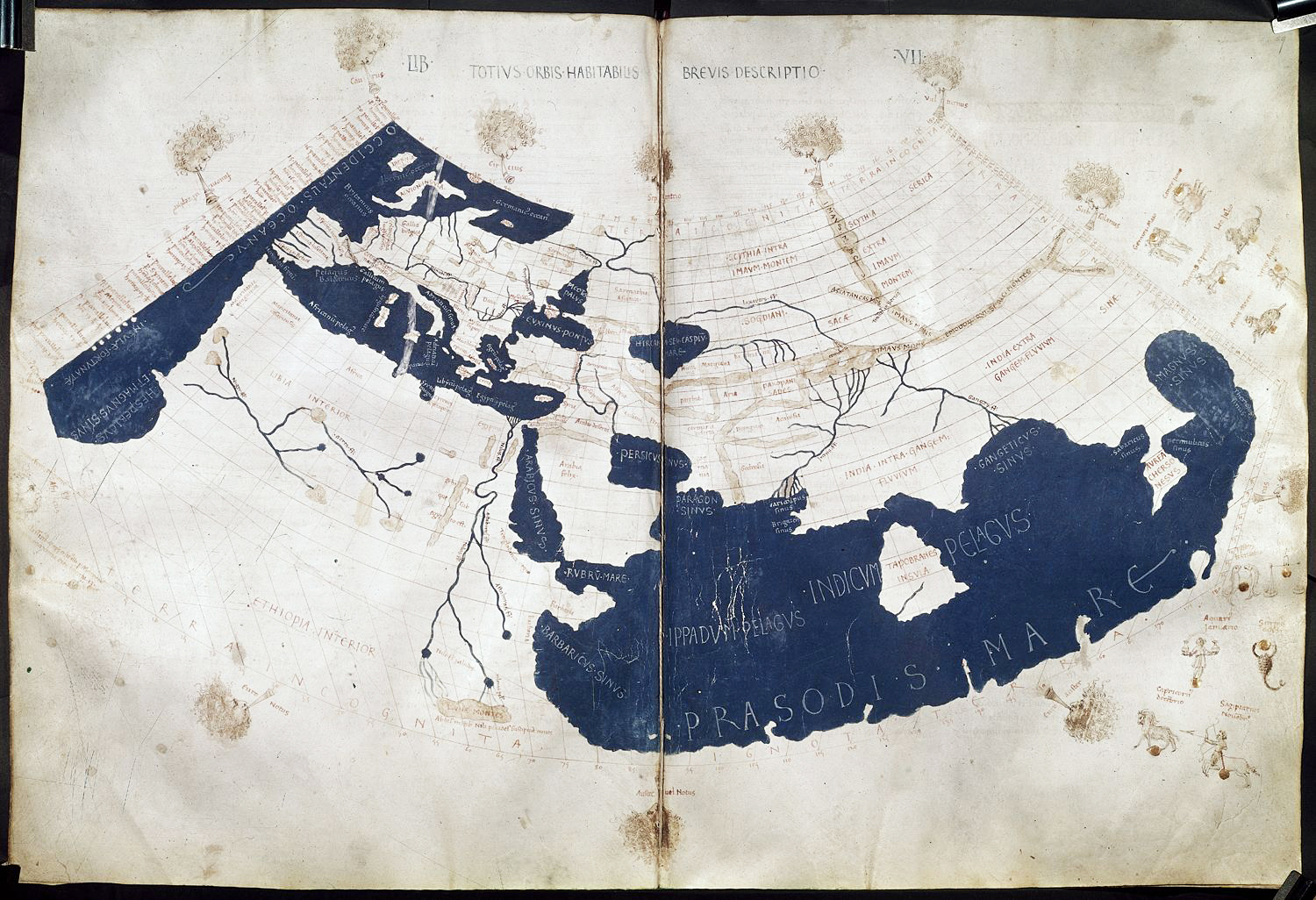
15th century reproduction of Ptolemy's world map from his 2nd century Geography.

Philosophy of geography is the subfield of philosophy which deals with epistemological, metaphysical, and axiological issues in geography, with geographic methodology in general, and with more broadly related issues such as the perception and representation of space and place.

== History ==
Philosophy of geography deals with epistemological, metaphysical, and axiological issues in geography, with geographic methodology in general, and with more broadly related issues such as the perception and representation of space and place.

Methodological issues concerning geographical knowledge have been debated for centuries, if not more.

In the US, Richard Hartshorne (1899–1992) is credited with its first major systematic treatment in English in 1939, The Nature of Geography: A Critical Survey of Current Thought in the Light of the Past, which prompted several volumes of critical essays in subsequent decades. Hartshorne himself credited the German geographer Alfred Hettner (1859–1941) as founder of a chorology tradition.

John Kirtland Wright (1891–1969), an American geographer notable for his cartography and study of the history of geographical thought, coined the related term geosophy in 1947, for this kind of broad study of geographical knowledge. Other key works in the field include David Harvey's 1969 Explanation in Geography and French philosopher Henri Lefebvre's 1974 The Production of Space. It was a discussion of issues he raised which in part inspired the founding of a Society for Philosophy and Geography in the 1990s.

== US organizations ==
The Society for Philosophy and Geography was founded in 1997 by Andrew Light, a philosopher later at George Mason University, and Jonathan Smith, a geographer at Texas A&M University. Three volumes of an annual peer-reviewed journal, Philosophy and Geography, were published by Rowman & Littlefield Press which later became a bi-annual journal published by Carfax publishers. This journal merged with another journal started by geographers, Ethics, Place, and Environment, in 2005 to become Ethics, Place, and Environment: A journal of philosophy and geography published by Routledge. The journal was edited by Light and Smith up to 2009, and has published work by philosophers, geographers, and others in allied fields, on questions of space, place, and the environment broadly construed. It has come to be recognized as instrumental in expanding the scope of the field of environmental ethics to include work on urban environments.

In 2009 Smith retired from the journal and Benjamin Hale from the University of Colorado came on as the new co-editor. Hale and Light relaunched the journal in January 2011 as Ethics, Policy and Environment. While the journal has since focused more on the relationship between environmental ethics and policy, it still welcomes submissions on relevant work from geographers.

A book series, also initially published by Rowman & Littlefield, and later by Cambridge Scholars Press, began in 2002 to publish the transactions of the Society for Philosophy and Geography's annual meetings, organized by Gary Backhaus and John Murungi of Towson University. In 2005 the society sponsoring these annual meetings became the International Association for the Study of Environment, Space, and Place, and in 2009 the book series gave way to a peer-reviewed journal, Environment, Space, Place, published semiannually and currently edited by C. Patrick Heidkamp, Troy Paddock, and Christine Petto of Southern Connecticut State University.

== See also ==
- Behavioral geography – Approach to human geography that examines human behavior using a disaggregate approach
- Five themes of geography – Educational tool
- Four traditions of geography – Proposed way to organize themes within geography
- Geographia Generalis – Geography textbook by Bernhardus Varenius
- Geography (Ptolemy) – Treatise on cartography by Claudius Ptolemaeus
- Geosophy
- History of Earth – Records of Earth's development
- Non-representational theory – Post-structuralist human geography theory
