= Synoptic =

Synoptic may refer to:

- Synoptic scale meteorology, a meteorological analysis over an area about 1,000 kilometres (621 mi) or more wide
- Synoptic Gospels, in the New Testament of the Bible, the gospels of Matthew, Mark, and Luke
- Synoptic philosophy, wisdom emerging from a coherent understanding of everything together
- Large Synoptic Survey Telescope, a wide-field reflecting telescope, currently under construction, that will photograph the entire available sky every few nights
- SynOptics, an early computer-network equipment vendor that operated from 1985 until 1994, based in Santa Clara, California
- Surface synoptic observations or SYNOP, a numerical code used for reporting weather observations
- Synopticon, "surveillance of the few by the many", a reverse of Bentham's Panopticism

== See also ==
- Synopsis (disambiguation)
