= Arthur H. Robinson =

American geographer and cartographer

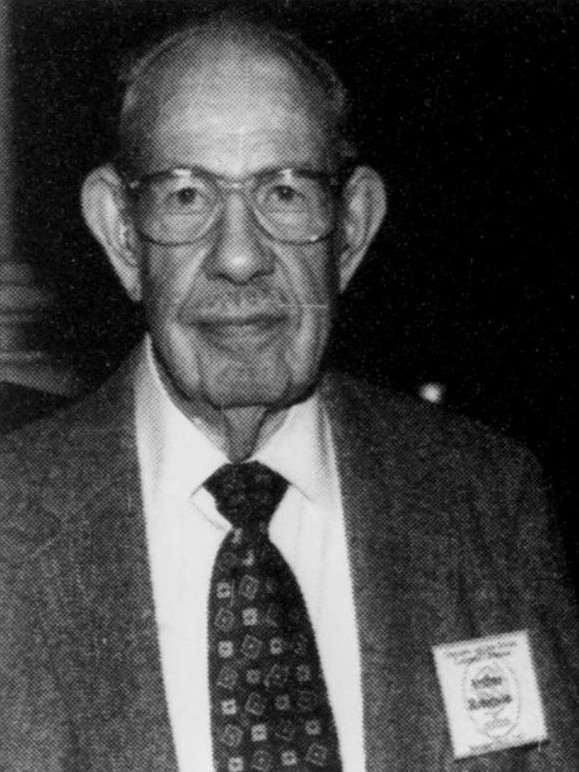
- Robinson in 1997
- Born: January 5, 1915; Montreal, Quebec, Canada
- Died: October 10, 2004 (aged 89); Madison, Wisconsin, U.S.
- Occupations: Geographer, cartographer

Arthur H. Robinson (January 5, 1915 – October 10, 2004) was an American geographer and cartographer, who was a professor in the Geography Department at the University of Wisconsin–Madison from 1947 until he retired in 1980. He was an influential writer, philosopher, and cartographer. In 1963, he invented the Robinson projection.

== Biography ==
Arthur H. Robinson was born in Montreal, Quebec, Canada, to American parents, James Howard Robinson and Elizabeth (Peavey) Robinson. He lived in Great Britain while he was young, and received his post-secondary education in the United States. His undergraduate work was done at Miami University in Oxford, Ohio, obtaining a B.A. degree in 1936. During his undergraduate work he became especially interested in cartography, and received practice drawing maps for faculty textbooks while earning a master's degree in geography from the University of Wisconsin–Madison, which was awarded in 1938. He earned his Ph.D. from Ohio State University in 1947. While at Ohio State, Robinson worked to solve problems in the Map communication model.

During World War II, Robinson served as director of the map division of the Office of Strategic Services (OSS). In 1941, when Robinson joined OSS, cartography was not yet an established academic discipline. Robinson engaged geographers with some interest in mapping and the group developed their techniques while working. Led by Robinson, the OSS cartographers designed a massive 50-inch globe for President Franklin Roosevelt, which became known as "The President's Globe." A copy of the globe was given to Winston Churchill as a gift and a third globe was provided for the use of George Marshall and Henry Stimson. While serving with the OSS, Robinson oversaw the creation of 5,000 hand-drawn maps and attended the Allied conferences at Quebec and Cairo in 1943 and in 1944, he served as chief U.S. map officer. For his efforts Robinson received the Legion of Merit from the United States Army in 1946.

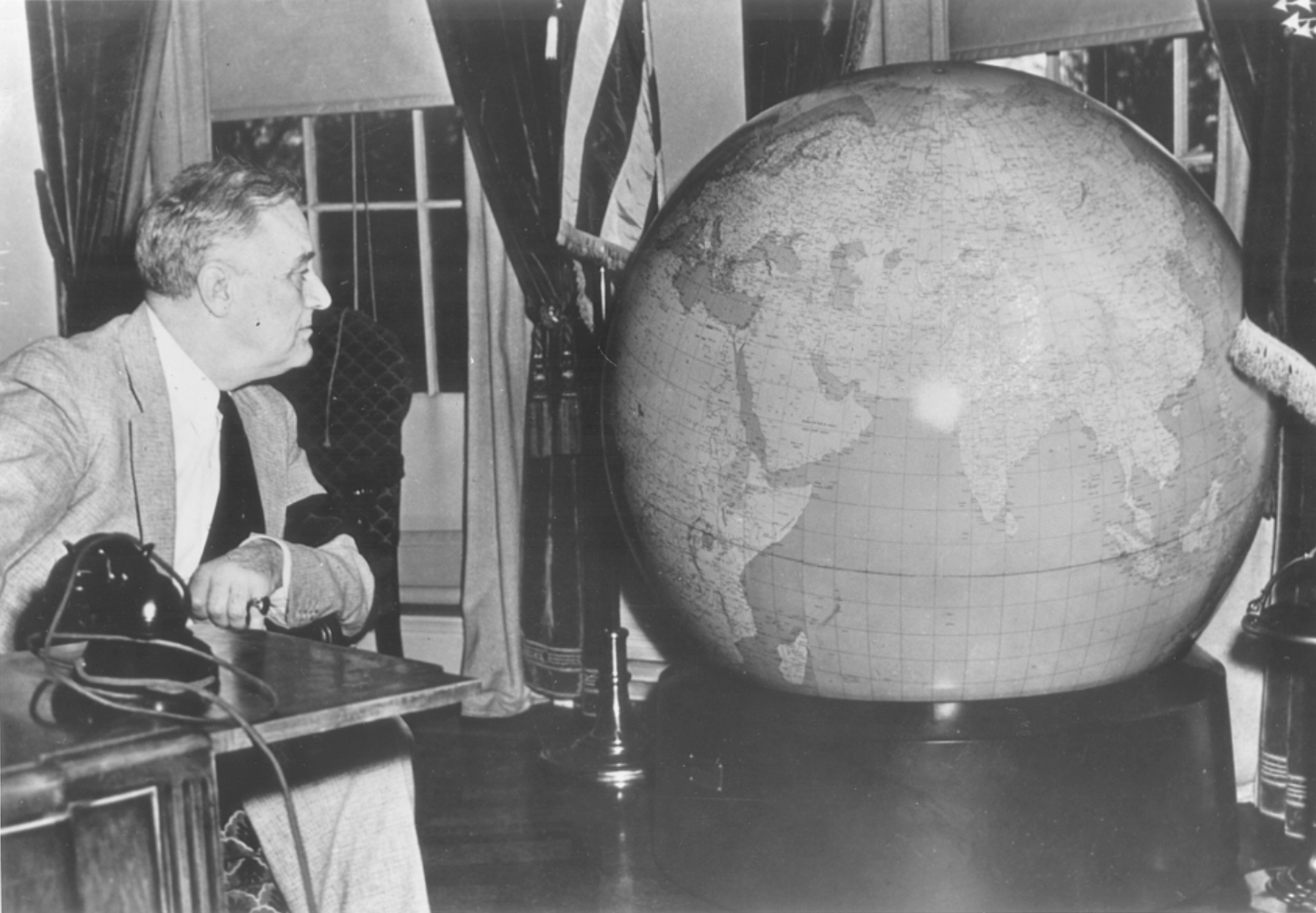
President Roosevelt studies the 50-inch globe produced by Arthur Robinson and the OSS

In 1947 Robinson subsequently joined the geography department at the University of Wisconsin–Madison, where he spent his career in academia and research. Robinson sought to establish cartography as a recognized discipline and ultimately the university granted both undergraduate and master's degrees in cartography. The Wisconsin cartography program has conferred more than 100 masters and 20 doctoral degrees, and many of the doctoral recipients created respected cartography programs at other universities. Today the map library at the University of Wisconsin–Madison is named in his honor.

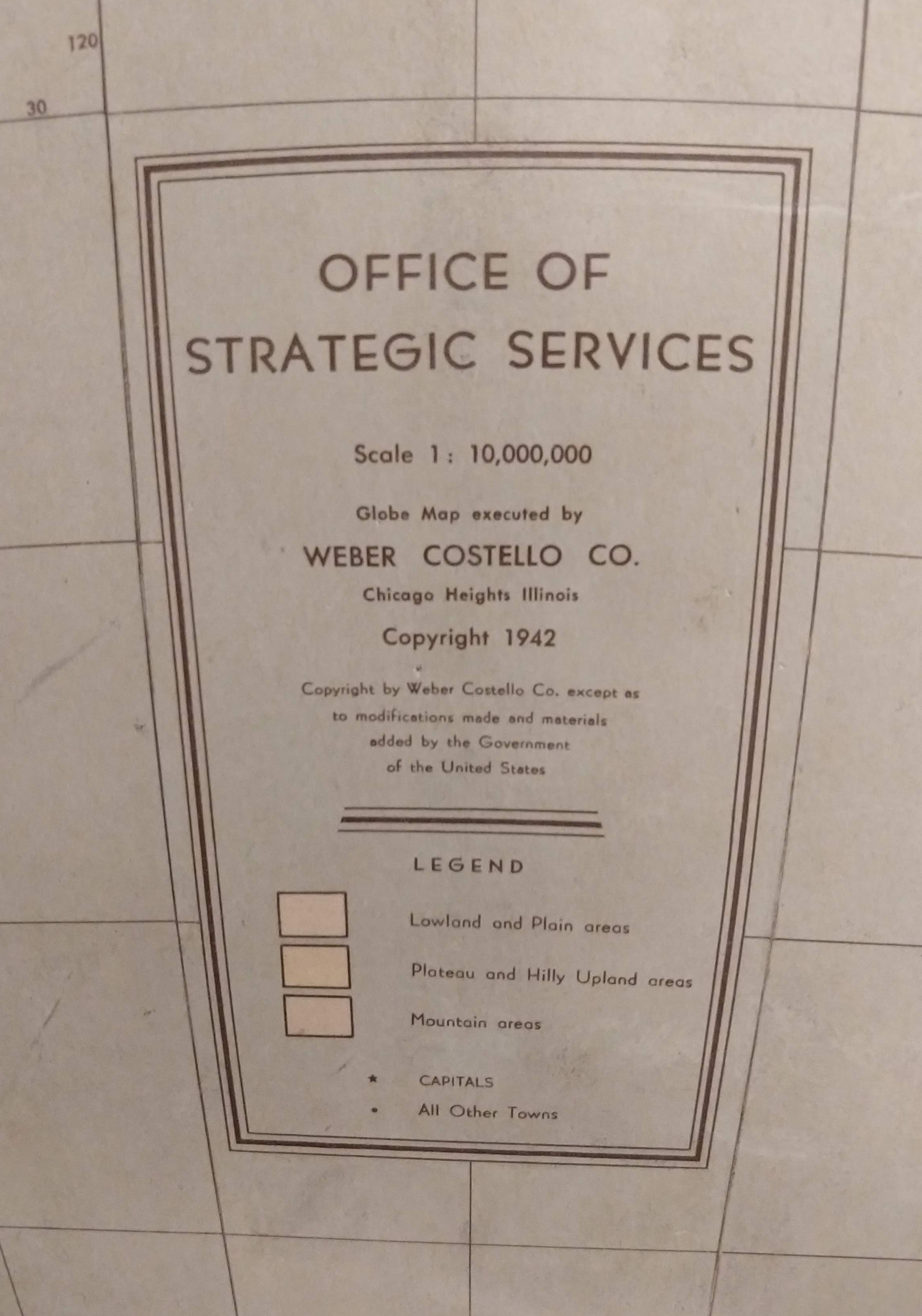
Detail of the cartouche on "The President's Globe"

Robinson served as president of the International Cartographic Association (1972–76), and as vice president and president of the Association of American Geographers. He was awarded the Carl Mannerfelt Gold Medal by the International Cartographic Association in 1980.

== Personal life ==
Robinson married Mary Elizabeth Coffin (1910–1992), daughter of John R. Coffin and Bessie Morris Coffin, on December 23, 1938, in Franklin County, Ohio. They had two children, a son and a daughter. After the death of his first wife, Robinson remarried in 1993. His second wife was Martha Elizabeth Rodabaugh Phillips (1914–2010), a widow, with whom he had attended school in Oxford, Ohio.

== Work ==
Robinson was a prolific writer and influential philosopher on cartography: According to Robinson, “the aim of cartographic design is to present the geographical data in such a fashion that the map, as a whole, appears as an integrated unit and so that each item included is clear, legible, and neither more nor less prominent than it should be.” Like Richard Edes Harrison, another successful wartime cartographer, Robinson warned against the dangers of blindly accepting conventions in map design, such as always putting north at the top of the map. Robinson wrote that neither logic nor educational value required placing north at the top of the map.

- In The Look of Maps (1952) which was based on his doctoral research, Robinson urged cartographers to consider the function of a map as an integral part of the design process.
- In the text In The Nature of Maps (1976), Robinson and co-author Barbara Bartz Petchenik created the term map percipient, a map user who interacts with a map in a discerning way and not merely as a casual observer. The authors stressed that ... the nature of the map as an image and the manner in which it functions as a communication device between the cartographer and percipient need much deeper consideration and analysis than they have yet received.
- Robinson also co-authored a widely used textbook, Elements of Cartography, the sixth and last edition of which was published in 1995.

=== Robinson projection ===
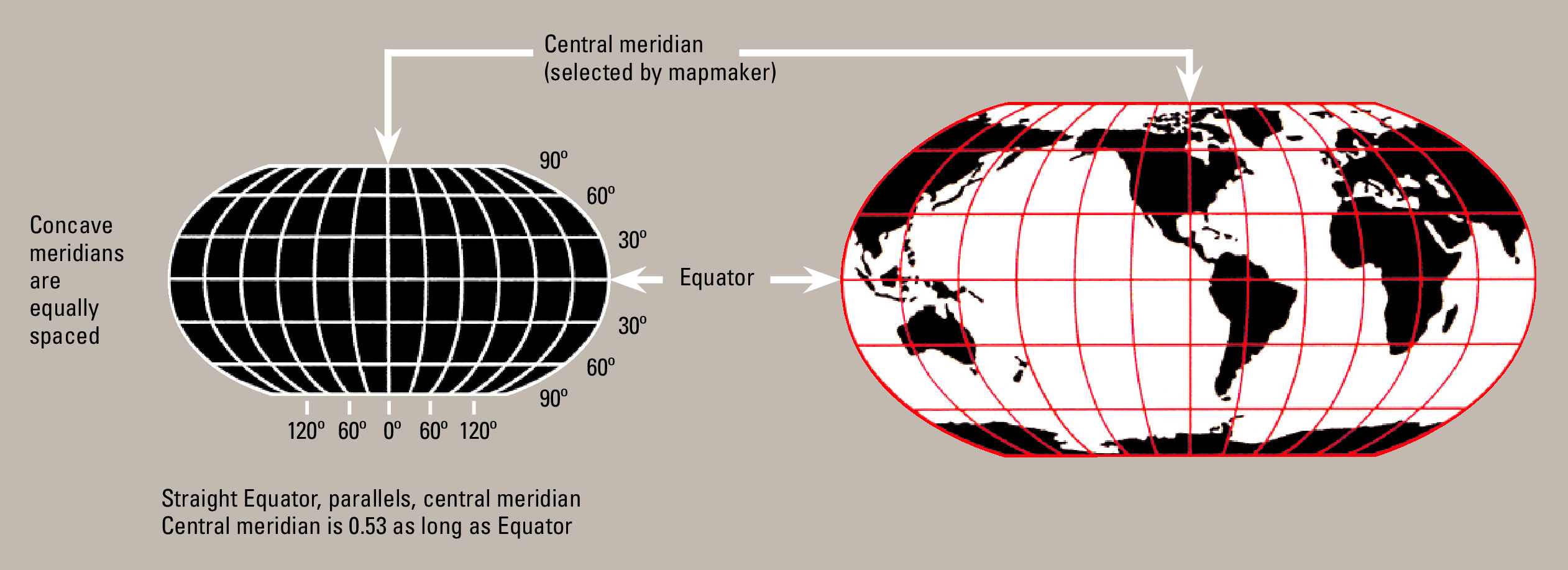
The Robinson projection is an example of a pseudocylindrical projection.

One of Robinson's most notable accomplishments is the Robinson projection. In 1961, Rand McNally asked Robinson to choose a projection for use as a world map that, among other criteria, was uninterrupted, had limited distortion, and was pleasing to the eye of general viewers. Robinson could not find a projection that satisfied the criteria, so Rand McNally commissioned him to design one.

Robinson proceeded through an iterative process to create a pseudo-cylindrical projection that intends to strike a compromise between distortions in areas and in distances, in order to attain a more natural visualization. The projection has been widely used since its introduction. In 1988, National Geographic adopted it for their world maps but replaced it in 1998 with the Winkel tripel projection.

== See also ==
- Rand McNally
- Nicolas Auguste Tissot
- David Woodward
- Geographers on Film

== Publications ==
Robinson produced over 60 articles for professional publications, as well as fifteen books and monographs. Books:

- 1952. The Look of Maps. Madison:University of Wisconsin Press.
- 1976. The Nature of Maps. With B. Petchenik. Chicago: The University of Chicago Press.
- 1982. Early Thematic Mapping in the History of Cartography.
- 1995. Elements of Cartography (6th Edition). With A. Robinson, J. Morrison, P. Muehrke, A. Kimmerling & S. Guptill. New York: Wiley.
