= Synopsia =

Synopsia may refer to:

- Synopsia (moth), a moth genus
- Synesthesia, a perceptual phenomenon

== See also ==
- Synopsis (disambiguation)
