= Geosophy =

Geosophy is a concept introduced to geography by J.K. Wright in 1947. The word is a compound of ‘geo’ (Greek for earth) and ‘sophia’ (Greek for wisdom). Wright defined it thus:

Geosophy ... is the study of geographical knowledge from any or all points of view. It is to geography what historiography is to history; it deals with the nature and expression of geographical knowledge both past and present—with what Whittlesey has called ‘man’s sense of [terrestrial] space’. Thus it extends far beyond the core area of scientific geographical knowledge or of geographical knowledge as otherwise systematized by geographers. Taking into account the whole peripheral realm, it covers the geographical ideas, both true and false, of all manner of people—not only geographers, but farmers and fishermen, business executives and poets, novelists and painters, Bedouins and Hottentots—and for this reason it necessarily has to do in large degree with subjective conceptions.

THE CONCEPT OF GEOSPHY Geosophy is the school of thought that asserts that earth cannot be studied independent of the people who live & experiences Earth. The range of perception of the Earth is so varied & there are as many perception as people themselves, so, it is impossible to study the Earth independent of people who experiences it. This concept reinforced the concept of cultural landscape of Carl 0. Sauer & Ratzel & also the work of vidals Genere-de-vie.

(Wright 1947)

This has been summarised as:

the study of the world as people conceive of and imagine it

(McGreevy 1987)

Belief systems as they relate to human interaction with the Earth's environments.

(attributed to Professor Innes Park 1995)

== Superstition ==
Geosophy is sometimes used as a synonym for the study of earth mysteries.

== See also ==
- American Association of Geographers
- Geopoetics
- Technical geography
  - Quantitative geography
  - Qualitative geography
