= Kenneth White =

Scottish poet, academic and writer (1936–2023)

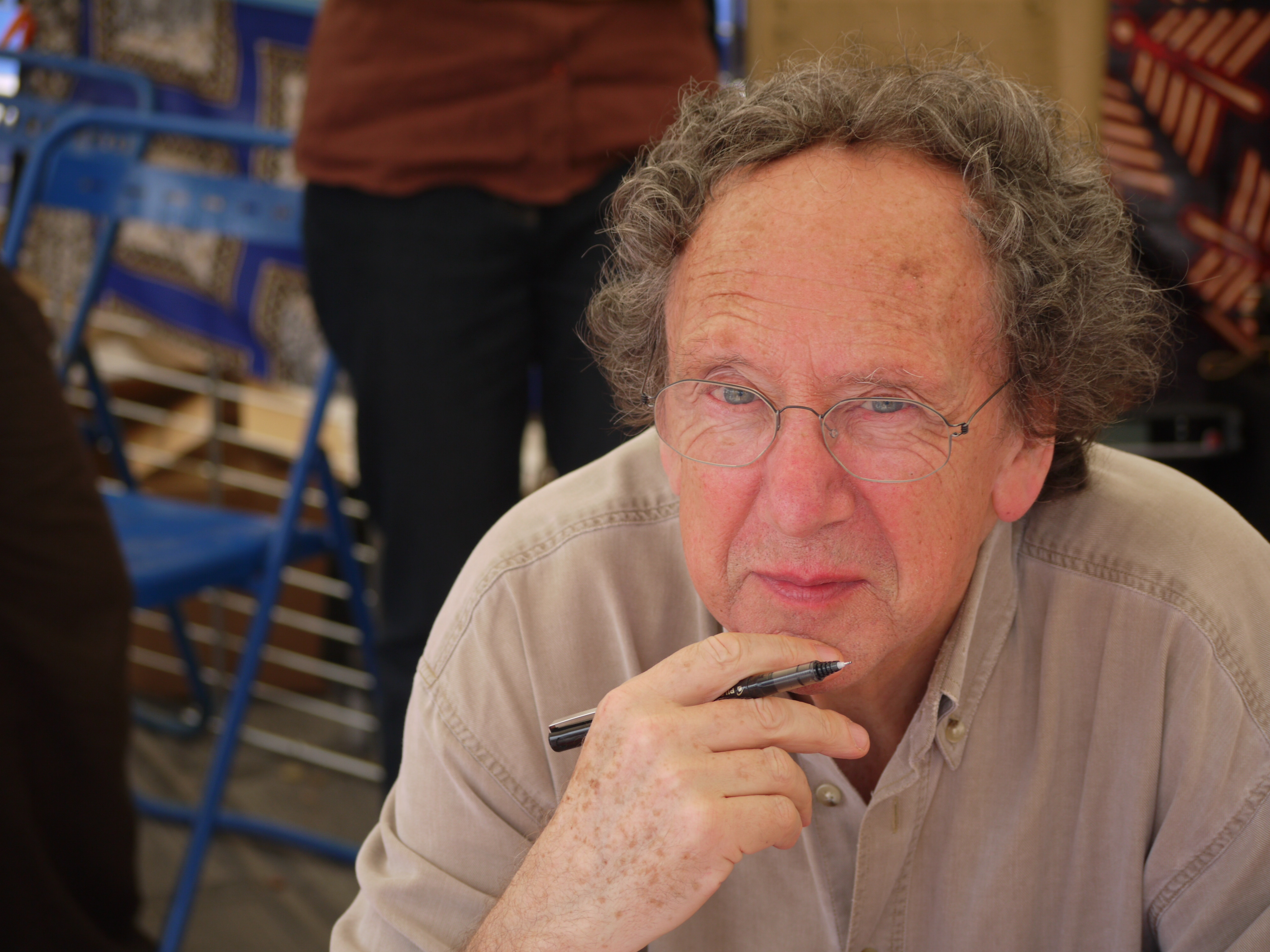
- White in 2009
- Born: 28 April 1936; Glasgow, Scotland, United Kingdom
- Died: 11 August 2023 (aged 87); France
- Education: University of Paris (D)

Kenneth White (28 April 1936 – 11 August 2023) was a Scottish poet, academic and writer.

== Biography ==
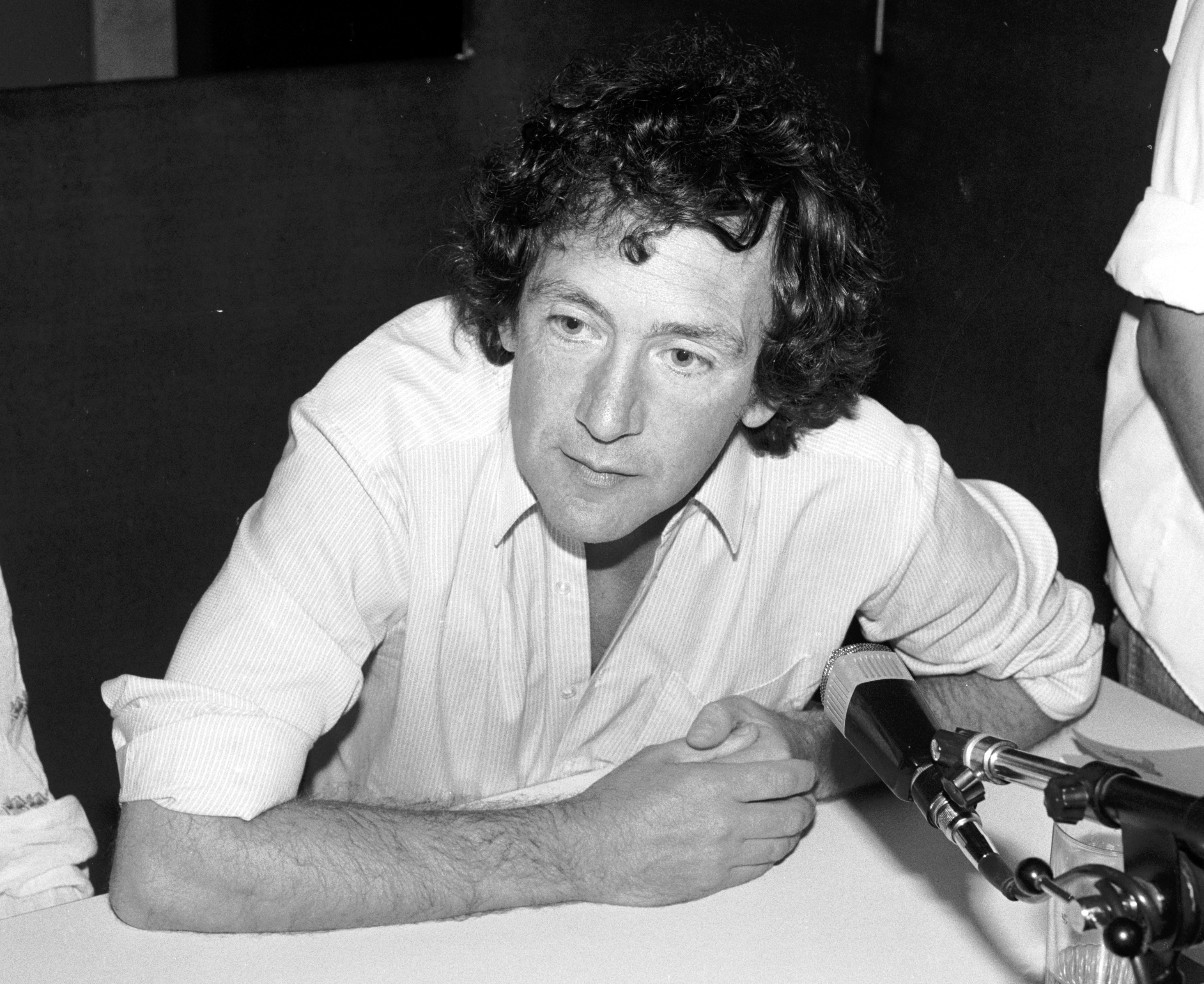
Morlaix, France, 1981

Kenneth White was born in the Gorbals area of Glasgow, Scotland, but he spent his childhood and adolescence at Fairlie near Largs on the Ayrshire coast, where his father worked as a railway signalman. In Fairlie, he encountered Dugald Semple, borrowing books from him and becoming influenced by his philosophy of simple living.

White obtained a double first in French and German from the University of Glasgow. From 1959 until 1963, White studied at the University of Paris, where he obtained a state doctorate. White purchased "Gourgounel", an old farm in the Ardèche region of France, where he could spend the summers and autumns studying and working on what would become Letters from Gourgounel.

In 1963, White returned to the University of Glasgow, where he lectured in French literature until 1967. Then, disillusioned by the contemporary British literary and poetry scene, White resigned from the University and moved to the city of Pau, near the Pyrenees, in south-west France, where he lectured in English at the University of Bordeaux. White was expelled from the University after his involvement in the student protests of May 1968. After leaving the University of Bordeaux, White remained at Pau and lectured at the University of Paris VII from 1969 until 1983, when he left the Pyrenees for the north coast of Brittany, and a new position as the chair of 20th-century poetics at Paris-Sorbonne.

In 1989, White founded the International Institute of Geopoetics to promote further research into the cross-cultural, transdisciplinary field of study which he had been developing during the previous decade.

In October 2005, Kenneth White delivered a series of three lectures on the Geopoetics project in the Highlands and Islands of Scotland. The first, 'North Atlantic Investigations', was delivered at Ullapool, the second, 'Return to the Territory', was delivered at Inverness, and the third, 'A Sense of High North', was delivered at Kirkwall. Transcriptions of the three lectures were published in 2006 as a single volume titled On the Atlantic Edge.

White held honorary doctorates from the University of Glasgow, the University of Edinburgh and the Open University. He was an honorary member of the Royal Scottish Academy, and was recently appointed a visiting professor at Scotland's UHI Millennium Institute.

Kenneth White lived on the north coast of Brittany with his wife Marie-Claude, who is a translator and photographer. He died there on 11 August 2023, at the age of 87.

== Bibliography ==
=== Poetry ===
- Wild Coal. Paris: Club des Étudiants d’Anglais (Sorbonne). (1963)
- En toute candeur. Paris: Mercure de France. (1964)
- The Cold Wind of Dawn. London: Jonathan Cape. (1966)
- The Most Difficult Area. London: Cape Goliard. (1968)
- Scènes d'un monde flottant. Lausanne: Alfred Eibel Editeur. (1976)
- Terre de diamant. Lausanne: Alfred Eibel Editeur. (1977)
- Mahamudra. Paris: Mercure de France. (1979)
- Ode fragmentée à la Bretagne blanche. Bordeaux: Willim Blake & Co. (1980)
- Le Grand Rivage. Paris: Nouveau Commerce. (1980)
- Le dernier voyage de Brandan. Paris: Les Presses d'Aujourd'hui. (1981)
- Atlantica. Paris: Grasset. (1986)
- L'anorak du goéland. Rouen: L’Instant Perpétuel. (1986)
- The Bird Path: Collected Longer Poems. Edinburgh and London: Mainstream. (1989)
- Handbook for the Diamond Country, Collected Shorter Poems 1960–1990. Edinburgh and London: Mainstream. (1990)
- Les Rives du silence. Paris: Mercure de France. (1998)
- Limites et marges. Paris: Mercure de France. (2000)
- Open World: Collected Poems 1960–2000. Edinburgh: Polygon. (2003)
- Le passage extérieur. Paris: Mercure de France. (2005)
- Les archives du littoral. Paris: Mercure de France. (2011)

=== Prose ===
- Letters from Gourgounel. London: Jonathan Cape. (1966)
- Les Limbes Incandescentes. Paris: Denoël. (1976)
- Derives. Paris: Denoël. (1978)
- L'Ecosse. Paris: Flammarion. (1980)
- Le Visage du Vent d'Est. Paris: Les Presses d'Aujourd'hui. (1980)
- La Route Bleue. Paris: Grasset. (1983)
- Travels in the Drifting Dawn. Edinburgh and London: Mainstream. (1989)
- Les Cygnes sauvages. Paris: Grasset. (1990)
- Pilgrim of the Void. Edinburgh and London: Mainstream. (1992)
- House of Tides: Letters from Brittany and Other Lands of the West. Edinburgh: Polygon. (2000)
- Across the Territories. Edinburgh: Polygon. (2004)
- Le Rôdeur des confins. Paris: Albin Michel. (2006)
- La Carte de Guido. Paris: Albin Michel. (2011)
- The Fundamental Field (with Jeff Malpas). Edinburgh: Edinburgh University Press (2021).

=== Essays ===
- The Tribal Dharma. Carmarthen: Unicorn Bookshop. (1975)
- The Coast opposite Humanity. Carmarthen: Unicorn Bookshop. (1975)
- Approches du Monde Blanc. Paris: Nouveau Commerce. (1976)
- The Life-technique of John Cowper Powys. Swansea: Galloping Dog Press. (1978)
- Segalen, Théorie et Pratique du Voyage. Lausanne: Alfred Eibel. (1979)
- La Figure du dehors. Paris: Grasset. (1982)
- Letter from North Armorica, in Hearn, Sheila G. (ed.), Cencrastus No. 16, Spring 1984, pp. 2 – 4, ISSN 0264-0856
- Une apocalypse tranquille. Paris: Grasset. (1985)
- Zen and the Birds of Kentigern, in Parker, Geoff (ed.), Cencrastus No. 23, Summer 1986, pp. 3 – 7, ISSN 0264-0856
- L'esprit Nomade. Paris: Grasset. (1987)
- Le Poète Cosmographe". Presses Universitaires de Bordeaux. (1987)
- Le Monde d'Antonin Artaud". Bruxelles: Complexe. (1989)
- Le Chant du Grand Pays". Nimes: Terriers (1989)
- Hokusai ou l'Horizon Sensible. Paris: Terrain Vague. (1990)
- Le Plateau de l’albatros: Introduction à la géopoétique. Paris: Grasset. (1994)
- Le Lieu et la Parole. Cleguer: Editions du Scorff. (1997)
- Une Strategie Paradoxale". Presses Universitaires de Bordeaux. (1998)
- Les Finisterres de l'Esprit. Cleguer: Editions du Scorff. (1998)
- On Scottish Ground. Edinburgh: Polygon. (1998)
- Le Champ du Grand Travail". Bruxelles: Didier Devillez. (2003)
- The Wanderer and His Charts. Edinburgh: Polygon. (2004)
- L'Ermitage des Brumes. Paris: Dervy. (2005)
- On the Atlantic Edge. Sandstone. (2006)
- Dialogue avec Deleuze. Paris: Isolato. (2007)
- Les Affinités Extremes. Paris: Albin Michel. (2009)

=== Collected Works in English ===
- The Collected Works of Kenneth White, ed. Cairns Craig, 4 vols, Edinburgh: Edinburgh UP. (2021-2025)

=== Interviews (Collected) ===
Coast to Coast. Glasgow, Open World and Mythic Horse Press, 1996.

=== Translations ===
- Showing the Way, a Hmong Initiation of the Dead. Bangkok, Pandora, 1983.
- André Breton, Selected Poems. London, Jonathan Cape, 1969
- André Breton, Ode to Charles Fourier. London, Cape Goliard Press, 1969.

=== Recorded poetry ===
- Into the White World. two cassettes of poetry readings, Scotsoun, 13 Ashton Rd, Glasgow G12 8SP, 1992.

=== Reviews ===
- review of St. Kilda's Parliament by Douglas Dunn, in Murray, Glen (ed.), Cencrastus No. 8, Spring 1982, pp. 44 & 45, ISSN 0264-0856

== Awards ==
- 1983 Prix Médicis étranger for La Route bleue
- 1985 French Academy's Grand Prix du Rayonnement
- 1987 Prix Alfred de Vigny for Atlantica
