= Four traditions of geography =

Proposed way to organize themes within geography

William Pattison's four traditions of geography, often referred to as just the four traditions of geography, are a proposed way to organize the various competing themes and approaches within geography. The original traditions proposed by Pattison are the spatial tradition, the area studies tradition, the Man-Land tradition, and the Earth science tradition. A theme among these traditions is interconnectedness, and it has been referenced in relation to the Tobler's first law of geography.

They were proposed in a 1964 article published in the Journal of Geography to address criticism that geography was undisciplined and calls for definitions of the scope of geography as a discipline that had been ongoing for at least half a century. The four traditions of geography propose that American geographers work was consistent, but fit into four distinct traditions rather than one overarching definition.

The four traditions of geography have been widely used to teach geography in the classroom as a compromise between a single definition and memorization of many distinct sub-themes. There are many competing methods to organize geography. The original four traditions have had several proposed changes.

== Original traditions outlined by Pattison ==
=== Spatial tradition ===
The spatial or locational tradition is concerned with employing quantitative methods to describe the spatial characteristics of a location. The spatial tradition seeks to use the spatial characteristics of a location or phenomena to understand and explain it. The contributors to this tradition were historically cartographers, but it now encompasses what we call technical geography and geographic information science. The spatial tradition is considered a key part of the discipline today, and was prominent during the Quantitative revolution.

=== Area studies ===
The area studies or regional tradition is concerned with the description of the unique characteristics of the earth's surface, resulting in each area from the combination of its complete natural or elements, as of physical and human environment. The main aim is to understand, or define the uniqueness, or character of a particular region that consists of natural as well as human elements. Attention is paid also to regionalization, which covers the proper techniques of space delimitation into regions.

=== Man-Land tradition ===
The Human Environment Interaction tradition (originally the Man-Land), also known as Integrated geography, is concerned with the description of the spatial interactions between humans and the natural world. It requires an understanding of the traditional aspects of physical and human geography, like how human societies conceptualize the environment. Integrated geography has emerged as a bridge between human and physical geography due to the increasing specialization of the two sub-fields, or branches.

=== Earth science tradition ===
The Earth science tradition is largely concerned with what is generally referred to as physical geography. The tradition focuses on understanding the spatial characteristics of natural phenomena. Some argue the Earth science tradition is a subset of the spatial tradition, however, the two are different enough in their focus and objectives to warrant separation.

== Changes over time ==
One of the most contentious terms is the "man-land tradition." This has been largely replaced by the term "human-environment interaction" or integrated geography. The Area studies tradition is also called the "regional" tradition.

== Impact and legacy ==
Pattison's Four Traditions of Geography have significantly influenced the structure of geographic inquiry. This framework has provided a foundation for organizing and understanding the diverse methodologies and approaches within the field. Scholars and students continue to engage with these traditions, contributing to ongoing debates and advancements in geographical research.

== Criticism ==
While widely embraced, the Four Traditions have not been without criticism. Some scholars argue for a more integrated and interdisciplinary approach that transcends the boundaries of these traditions. Additionally, ongoing developments in technology, globalization, and environmental concerns have prompted discussions on potential expansions or revisions to accommodate contemporary challenges.

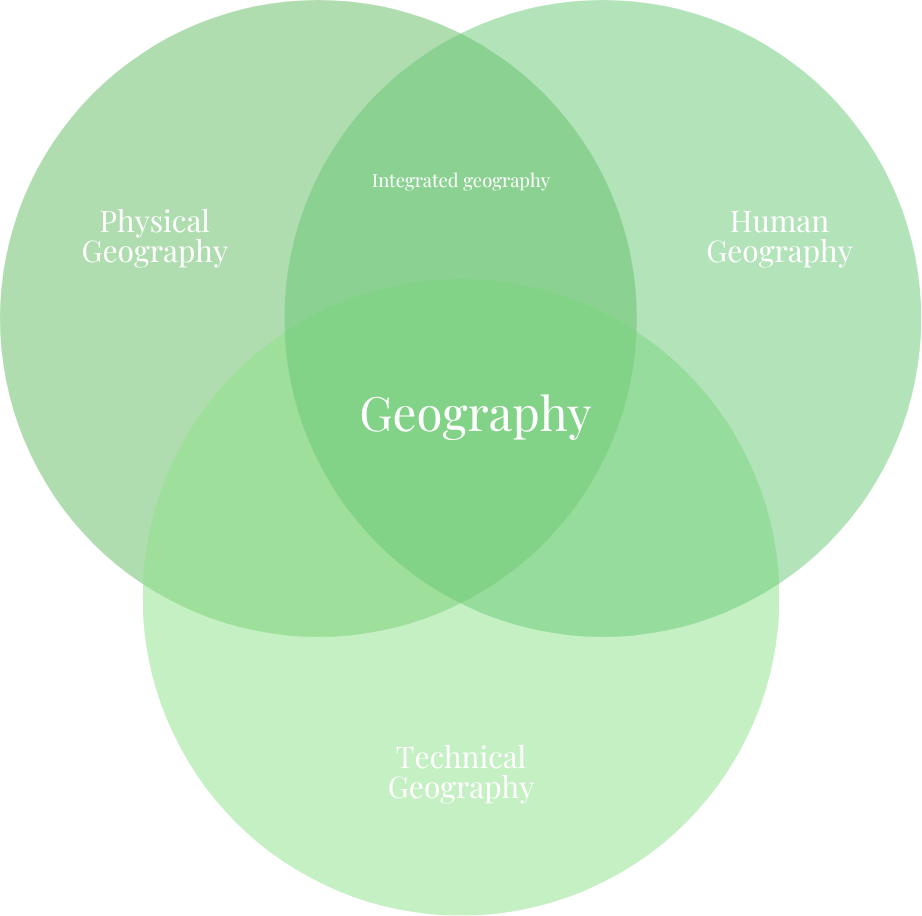
The relationship between the three branches of geography

There are many other methods for organizing geography, including three branches proposed in the UNESCO Encyclopedia of Life Support Systems, which consist of physical geography, human geography, and technical geography.

== See also ==
- Earth analog – Planet with environment similar to Earth's
- Geologic time scale – System that relates geologic strata to time
- Geophysics – Physics of the Earth and its vicinity
- History of Earth
- Terrestrial planet – Planet that is composed primarily of silicate rocks or metals
- Theoretical planetology – Scientific modeling of planets
