= Geographia Technica =

Academic journal

- Discipline: Geography
- Language: English
- Edited by: Ionel Haidu

Publication details
- History: 2006-present
- Publisher: Geographia Technica Association (Romania)
- Frequency: Biannually
- Open access: Yes
- License: CC BY-NC-ND 4.0

Standard abbreviations
- ISO 4: Geogr. Tech.

Indexing
- ISSN: 1842-5135 (print); 2065-4421 (web)

Links
- Journal homepage

Geographia Technica is a biannual open-access peer-reviewed academic journal. The journal focuses on quantitative and technical methods in the discipline of geography. The journal was established in 2006 and the editor-in-chief is Ionel Haidu (University of Lorraine).

== See also ==
- American Association of Geographers
- Geographic Information Systems
- National Council for Geographic Education
