= Map communication model =

The Map Communication Model is a theory in cartography that characterizes mapping as a process of transmitting geographic information via the map from the cartographer to the end-user. It was perhaps the first paradigm to gain widespread acceptance in cartography in the international cartographic community and between academic and practising cartographers.

== Overview ==
By the mid-20th century, according to Crampton (2001) "cartographers as Arthur H. Robinson and others had begun to see the map as primarily a communication tool, and so developed a specific model for map communication, the map communication model (MCM)". This model, according to Andrews (1988) "can be grouped with the other major communication models of the time, such as the Shannon-Weaver and Lasswell models of communication. The map communication model led to a whole new body of research, methodologies and map design paradigms"

One of the implications of this communication model according to Crampton (2001) "endorsed an “epistemic break” that shifted our understandings of maps as communication systems to investigating them in terms of fields of power relations and exploring the “mapping environments in which knowledge is constructed”... This involved examining the social contexts in which maps were both produced and used, a departure from simply seeing maps as artifacts to be understood apart from this context".

A second implication of this model is the presumption inherited from positivism that it is possible to separate facts from values. As Harley stated: Maps are never value-free images; except in the narrowest Euclidean sense they are not in themselves either true or false. Both in the selectivity of their content and in their signs and styles of representation maps are a way of conceiving, articulating, and structuring the human world which is biased towards, promoted by, and exerts influence upon particular sets of social relations. By accepting such premises it becomes easier to see how appropriate they are to manipulation by the powerful in society.

== History ==
Although this was a postwar discovery, the Map Communication Model (MCM) has its roots in information theory developed in the telephone industry before the war began. Mathematician, inventor, and teacher Claude Shannon worked at Bell Labs after completing his Ph.D. at the Massachusetts Institute of Technology in 1940. Shannon applied mathematical theory to information and demonstrated that communication could be reduced to binary digits (bits) of positive and negative circuits. This information could be coded and transmitted across a noisy interface without losing any meaning. Once the information was received it was then decoded by the listener; the integrity of the information remained intact. In producing meaningful sounds that could be measured for quality, Shannon produced the beginning of information theory and digital communication through circuits of on and off switches.

Shannon developed his ideas more thoroughly in the 1940s at the same time that geographer and cartographer Arthur H. Robinson returned from the Second World War during which he had served as cartographer for the military. Robinson found that cartographers were significantly limited because artists could make more effective maps than geographers. Upon returning from the war, Robinson worked to remedy this problem at Ohio State University where he was a graduate student. His The Look of Maps emphasizes the importance of lettering, map design, map structure, color, and technique.

Information theory helped turn the map into a medium of communicating information. Although Robinson never articulated a map model that could govern the new scientific pursuit of maps, his role in the war led to an understanding of the practical need for maps based on science not art. Robinson opened the door for others to apply Shannon's Mathematical Theory of Communication to the design of maps. British geographer Christopher Board developed the first MCM in 1967 but it was cumbersome and poorly measured a map's information quality. The Czech Geographer Koláčný's 1969 version made several key improvements to Board's model. These versions of the MCM helped cartographers realize the problems that Robinson noted as a war cartographer and helped articulate the discipline in terms of science.
