= Dialogues in Human Geography =

- Discipline: Human geography
- Language: English
- Edited by: Reuben Rose-Redwood

Publication details
- History: 2011–present
- Publisher: SAGE Publishing (England)
- Frequency: Triannual
- Impact factor: 8.2 (2023)

Standard abbreviations
- ISO 4: Dialogues Hum. Geogr.

Indexing
- ISSN: 2043-8206 (print); 2043-8214 (web)

Links
- Journal homepage; Online access; Online archive

Dialogues in Human Geography is a triannual peer-reviewed academic journal covering human geography. It was established in 2011 and is published by SAGE Publishing. The journal's founding editor was Rob Kitchin (Maynooth University) and the current Editor-in-Chief is Reuben Rose-Redwood (University of Victoria). According to the Journal Citation Reports, the journal has a 2023 impact factor of 8.2, ranking it 2nd out of 172 journals in the category "Geography."

In 2022, the related journal Dialogues in Urban Research was started, with Clark University geographer Mark Davidson as Editor-in-Chief.
