= Transcript poetry =

Transcript poetry is a research method of data collection by which researchers use selected parts of transcripts and create poems that represent the original text in a new way. It is regarded as a collaborative approach to qualitative research that promotes the inclusion of the participant in the method of data collection (Burdick, M., 2011). Qualitative researchers are beginning to recognize the value of using transcription poetry as a way of giving more "voice" to the research participants' experiences (Bhattacharya, K., 2013). Its value is by creating a "snapshot" of the original interview text using an art centred approach that makes for a more emotional impact statement to the reader. In her article, Burdick (2011) states, "These poems not only reveal critical insights and perspectives of our 2 participants, they also aim to convey intrinsic details of feelings, critical experiences, and/or epiphanies in their lived experiences."

== History ==
In the early 1990s, sociologist, Laurel Richardson started incorporating poetry into the research method as a way of bringing more participant voice into the qualitative research method. Richardson took notice that the poetic method was not warmly embraced by the scientific community as it did not follow the already established norms and practices of research methodology. However, Richardson saw that a change was occurring, "as these researchers begin to examine issues of culture, power, and authority in new ways (2011). In her article, Burdick (2011) wrote, "poetry offers something "profoundly different" to the world of educational research. When using poetry, researchers must be willing to trust the process more than finding the right answer. Poetry is meant to focus on different questions and contribute a new narrative to how knowledge is perceived and created."

== Method ==
Transcript poetry is found between fieldnotes/texts and the final research report. Researchers work through the transcript texts and code them for themes, thereby condensing larger transcripts to poems that act as a synopsis for part of or the whole transcript. The researcher collaborates with the participant ensuring the message of the original transcript is intact (Ratković, S., 2014).

== See also ==
- Narrative inquiry
