= Hami Desert =

Desert in Xinjiang, China

Hami Desert 哈密沙漠 (Chinese)
- Desert
- The Desert of Hami
- Location: Gobi Desert, Xinjiang, China

The Desert of Hami (Chinese: 哈密沙漠; pinyin: Hāmì Shāmò, Uyghur: Қумул Қумлуқи) is a section of the Gobi Desert in Xinjiang, China that occupies the space between the Tian Shan system on the north and the Nan-shan Mountains on the south, and is connected on the west with the Desert of Lop.

== Przhevalsky, 1879 ==
This classic account is that of Nikolai Przhevalsky, who crossed the desert from Hami (or Khumul) to Suchow in the summer of 1879.

The middle of the desert rises into a plateau 80 miles (130 km) across, which reaches an average elevation of 5,000 feet (1,500 m) and a maximum elevation of 5,500 feet (1,700 m). On its northern and southern borders it is overtopped by two divisions of the Bey-san (Pe-shan) Mountains, which are isolated hills or groups of hills only a few hundred feet higher than the plateau. They are separated from the Kuruk-tagh by a well-marked bay of the former Central Asian Mediterranean (Lop Nur).

Between the northern division and the Karlyk-tagh range (or east Tian Shan), there is an undulating barren plain, 3,900 feet (1,200 m) in altitude and 40 miles (64 km) from north to south, sloping downwards from both north and south towards the middle, where lies the oasis of Hami (2,800 ft). Similarly, from the southern division of the Bey-san, a second plain slopes down for 1,000 feet (300 m) to the valley of the river Bulunzir (or Su-lai-ho), which comes out of China, from the south side of the Great Wall, and finally empties itself into the lake of Kalachi (or Kara-nor). From the Bulunzir the same plain continues southwards at a level of 3,700 feet (1,100 m) to the foot of the Nan-shan Mountains. The total breadth of the desert here, from north to south, is 200 miles (320 km).

Its general character is that of an undulating plain, dotted over with occasional elevations of clay, which present the appearance of walls, table-topped mounds and broken towers (jardangs), the surface of the plain being strewn with gravel and destitute of vegetation. The swelling or undulating plain between these two ranges of the Bey-san measures about 70 miles (110 km) across and is traversed by several stretches of high ground having generally an east–west direction.

== Futterer, 1896 ==
Karl Josef Futterer, who crossed the same desert twenty years after Przhevalsky, agrees generally in his description of it, but supplements the account of the latter explorer with several particulars. He observes that the ranges in this part of the Gobi are much worn down and wasted, like the Kuruk-tagh farther west and the tablelands of Southeast Mongolia farther east, through the effects of century-long insolation, wind erosion, great and sudden changes of temperature, chemical action and occasional water erosion. Vast areas towards the north consist of expanses of gently sloping clay, intermingled with gravel. He points out also that the greatest accumulations of sand and other products of wind scouring do not occur in the deepest parts of the depressions but at the outlets of the valleys and glens, and along the foot of the ranges which flank the depressions on the south. Wherever water has been, desert scrub is found, such as tamarisks, Dodartia orientalis, Agriophyllum gobicum, Calligonium sinnex, and Lycium ruthenicum, but all with their roots elevated on little mounds in the same way as the tamarisks grow in the Taklamakan and the desert of Lop.

Farther east, towards central Mongolia, the relations, says Futterer, are the same as along the Hami-Su-chow route, except that the ranges have lower and broader crests, and the detached hills are more denuded and more disintegrated. Between the ranges occur broad, flat, cauldron-shaped valleys and basins, almost destitute of life except for a few hares and a few birds, such as the crow and the pheasant, and with scanty vegetation, but no great accumulations of drift-sand. The rocks are severely weathered on the surface, a thick layer of the coarser products of denudation covers the flat parts and climbs a good way up the flanks of the mountain ranges, but all the finer material, sand and clay has been blown away partly southeast into the Ordos, partly into the Chinese provinces of Shen-si and Shan-si, where it is deposited as loess, and partly west, where it chokes all the southern parts of the basin of the Tarim. In these central parts of the Gobi, as indeed in all other parts except the desert of Lop and Ordos, the prevailing winds blow from the west and northwest. These winds are warm in summer, and it is they which in the desert of Hami bring the fierce sandstorms or burans. The wind does blow also from the northeast, but it is then cold and often brings snow, which clears the air of the usual dust haze.

In summer, great heat is encountered here on the relatively low (3000–4600 feet), gravelly expanses on the north and on those of the south (4000–5000 feet); but on the higher ground between, which in the Pe-shan ranges ascends to 7,550 feet (2,300 m), there is great cold even in summer, and a wide daily range of temperature. Above the broad and deep accumulations of the products of denudation which have been brought down by the rivers from the Tian Shan ranges (e.g. the Karlyk-tagh) on the north and from the Nanshan on the south, and have filled up the cauldron-shaped valleys, there rises a broad swelling, built up of granitic rocks, crystalline schists and metamorphosed sedimentary rocks of both Archaic and Palaeozoic age, all greatly folded and tilted up, and shot through with numerous irruptions of volcanic rocks, predominantly porphyritic and dioritic. On this swelling rise four more or less parallel mountain ranges of the Pe-shan system, together with a fifth chain of hills farther south, all having a strike from west-northwest to east-northeast. The range farthest north rises to 1,000 feet (300 m) above the desert and 7,550 feet (2,300 m) above sea-level, the next two ranges reach 1,300 feet (400 m) above the general level of the desert, and the range farthest south 1,475 feet (450 m) or an absolute altitude of 7,200 feet (2,200 m), while the fifth chain of hills does not exceed 650 feet (200 m) in relative elevation.

All these ranges decrease in altitude from west to east. In the depressions that border the Pe-shan swelling on north and south are found the sedimentary deposits of the Tertiary sea of the Han-hai, but no traces of those deposits have been found on the swelling itself at altitudes of 5600 to 5,700 feet (1,700 m). Hence, Futterer infers, in recent geological times no large sea has occupied the central part of the Gobi.

== Inhabitants ==
Beyond an occasional visit from a band of nomad Mongols, this region of the Pe-shan swelling is entirely uninhabited. And yet it was from this region, according to Grigory Grum-Grshimailo (1889-1890 explorer), that the Yue-chi (Yuezhi), a nomadic people akin to the Tibetans, proceeded when, towards the middle of the second century BC, they moved westwards and settled near Lake Issyk-kul; and from here proceeded also the Shanshani, or people who some two thousand years ago founded the state of Shanshan or Lofi-lan. The ruins of this town were discovered by Sven Hedin in the desert of Lop in 1901. Here, says the Russian explorer, the Huns gathered strength, as also did the Turks (Ch. Tukiu) in the sixth century, and the Uighur tribes and the rulers of the Tangut kingdom. But after Genghis Khan, in the 12th century, drew away the peoples of this region, and no others came to take their place, the country went out of cultivation and eventually became the barren desert it is now. During the Hun time, and probably into the Middle Ages, the present desert was a lush steppe grassland able to support sustainable seasonal nomadic horse husbandry on a large scale.

== See also ==
- Geography of China
- Gobi Desert
