= Geography of China =

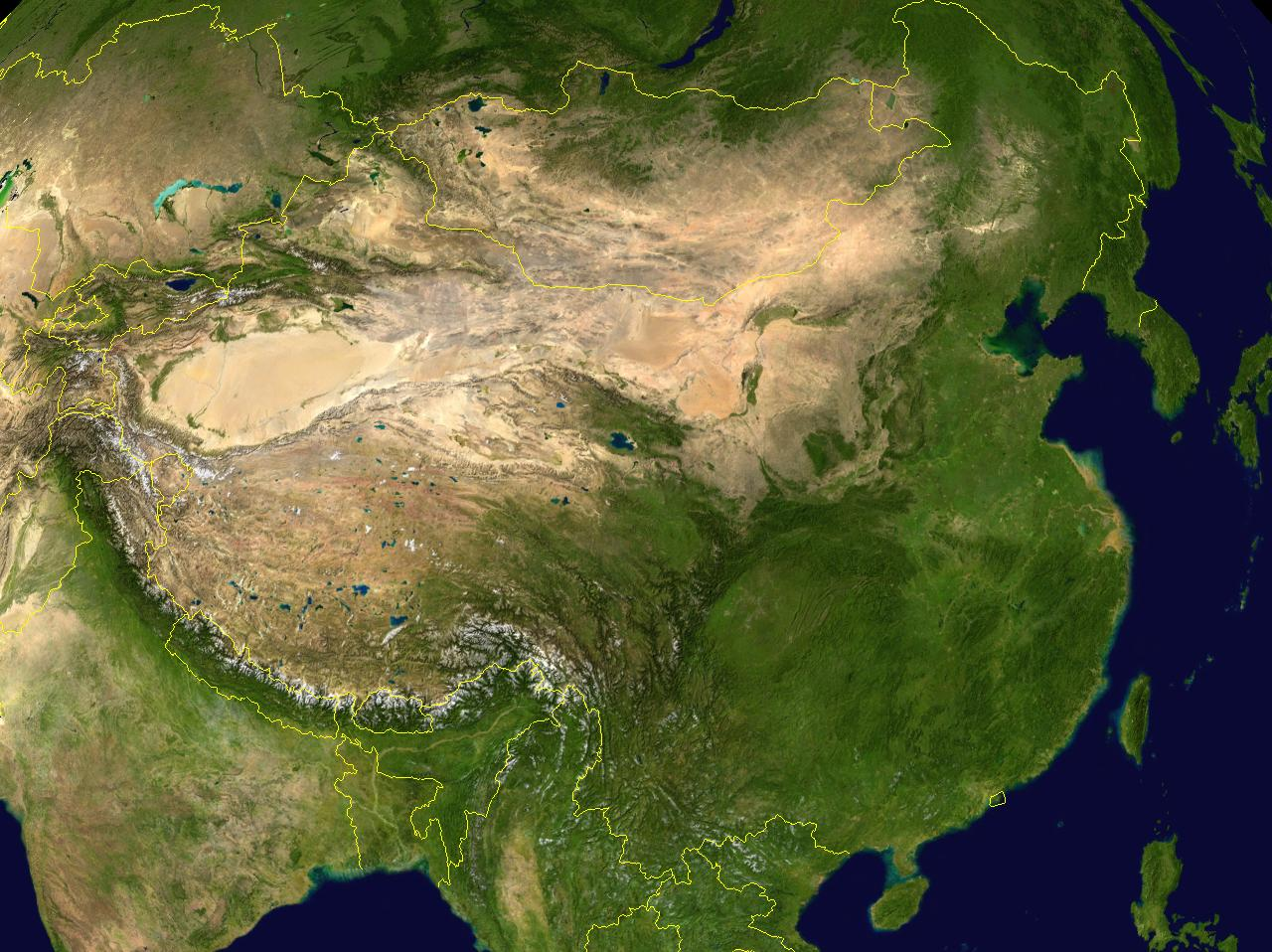
- Satellite map of China
- Continent: Asia
- Region: East Asia
- Coordinates: 35°0′N 105°0′E
- Area: Ranked 3/4
  - Total: 9,596,960 km^{2} (3,705,410 sq mi)
  - Land: 97.2%
  - Water: 2.8%
- Coastline: 14,500 km (9,000 mi)
- Borders: Afghanistan, Bhutan, Myanmar, India, North Korea, Kazakhstan, Kyrgyzstan, Pakistan, Laos, Mongolia, Nepal, Russia, Tajikistan, Vietnam
- Highest point: Mount Everest, 8,848.86 m (29,032 ft)
- Lowest point: Turpan Depression, −154 m (−505 ft)
- Longest river: Yangtze River
- Largest lake: Qinghai Lake
- Climate: diverse; ranges from tropical in south to subarctic in north
- Terrain: mostly mountains, high plateaus, deserts in west and plains, deltas and hills in east
- Natural resources: coal, iron ore, petroleum, natural gas, mercury, tin, tungsten, antimony, manganese, molybdenum, vanadium, magnetite, aluminum, lead, zinc, rare earth elements, uranium, hydropower potential, arable land
- Natural hazards: typhoons; damaging floods; tsunamis; earthquakes; droughts; land subsidence
- Environmental issues: air pollution; water shortages; water pollution; deforestation; soil erosion; desertification; trade in endangered species

China has a highly diverse physical geography. The eastern half of the country consists of fertile plains and foothills in the north as well as hilly and mountainous terrain in the south. It is the location of most of China's population and agricultural output. The northwest of the country is dominated by sunken basins, rolling plateaus, and towering massifs, and has much lower population and agricultural potential. In the southwest is the highest plateau on earth, the Tibetan Plateau. The 18,000 km (11,000 mi) coastline has been used extensively for export-oriented trade, causing the coastal provinces to become the leading economic center.

The People's Republic of China has an area of about 9,600,000 km^{2} (3,700,000 sq mi). The exact land area is sometimes challenged by border disputes, most notably about Taiwan, Aksai Chin, the Trans-Karakoram Tract, and South Tibet. The area of the People's Republic of China is 9,596,960 km^{2} (3,705,410 sq mi) according to the CIA's The World Factbook. The People's Republic of China is either the third or fourth-largest country in the world, being either slightly larger or slightly smaller than the United States, depending on how the area of the United States is measured. Both countries are smaller than Russia and Canada and larger than Brazil.

== Physical geography ==
=== Generalities ===
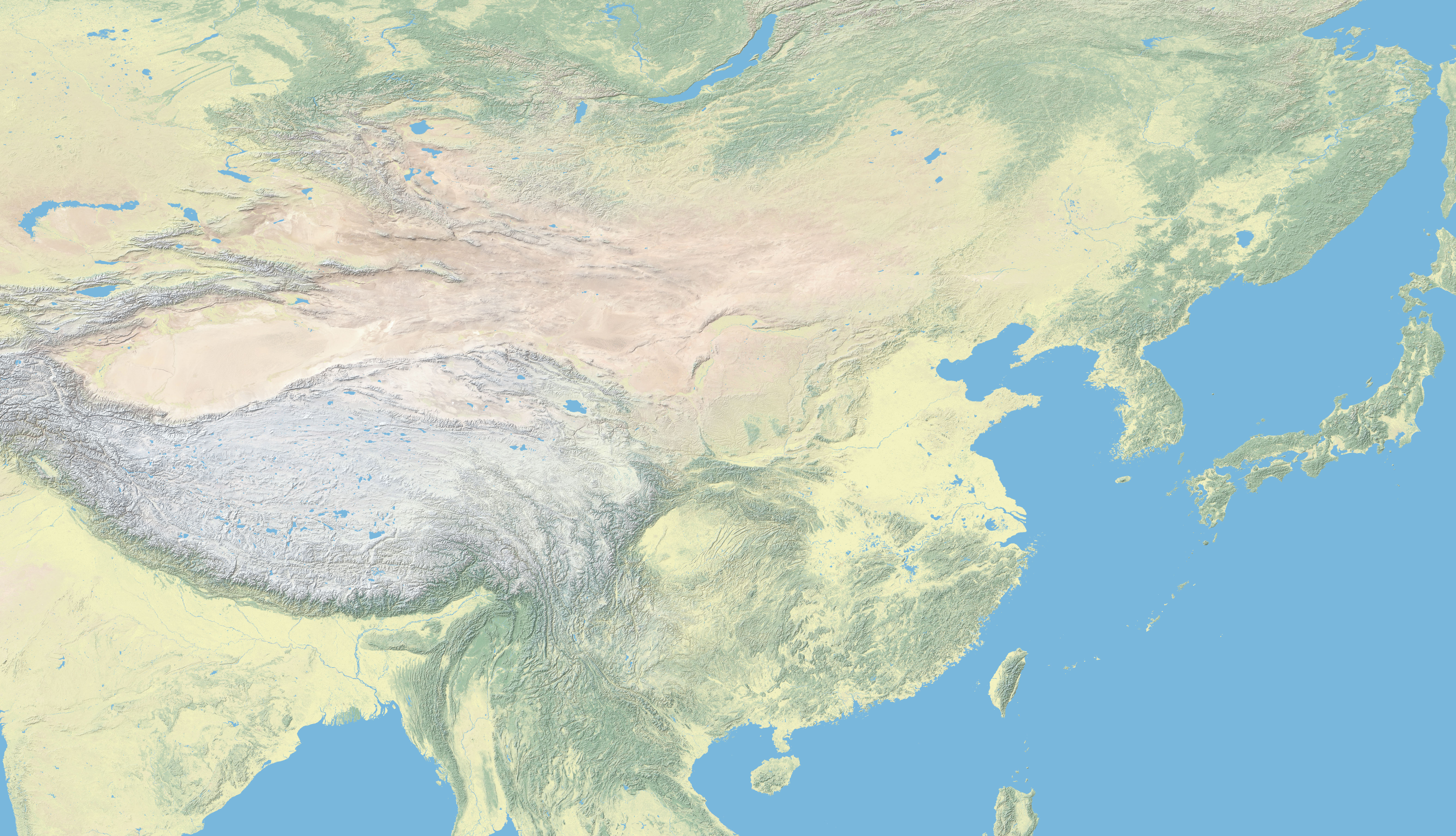
Topographic map of China

China is located on the eastern part of the Eurasian continent. The vast majority of China's land area is situated in the middle latitudes, with 98 percent of the land area between 20° and 50° N. Therefore, climates are mostly temperate or subtropical, while China's east coastal location leads to a great continentality in climate. As China is sandwiched between the largest continent (Eurasia) and the largest ocean (Pacific), monsoons are well developed, particularly in the eastern half of the country.

The topography of China is mountainous. Mountains, hills and plateaus occupy 65 per cent of the total land area. Land below 500 metres (1,600 ft) and that above 3,000 metres (9,800 ft) in elevation both account for around 25 per cent of the total land area. China's land topography is arranged in three steps: The Tibetan Plateau with an average elevation of over 4,000 metres (13,100 ft) forms the first step. The second step consists of plateaus and plains mainly between 1,000 metres (3,300 ft) and 2,000 metres (6,600 ft), up to the Greater Khingan Range, the Taihang Mountains and the Wu Mountains. The final step, including the Northeast China Plain, the North China Plain, the Yangtze Plain and the low hills in southern China, is generally below 500 metres (1,600 ft).

China can be broadly divided into three major natural regions, namely Eastern (Monsoon) China, Northwest (Arid) China (also known as Xinjiang-Mongolia), and the Tibetan Plateau. The first region may be further divided into Northern and Southern regions, and encompasses the traditional divisions of Northeast China, North China, Central China, South China and a part of Southwest China. These natural regions correspond closely to major vegetation zones: forests in Eastern China, grassland and desert in Northwest China, and a frigid zone covering the Tibetan Plateau.

Geography of China

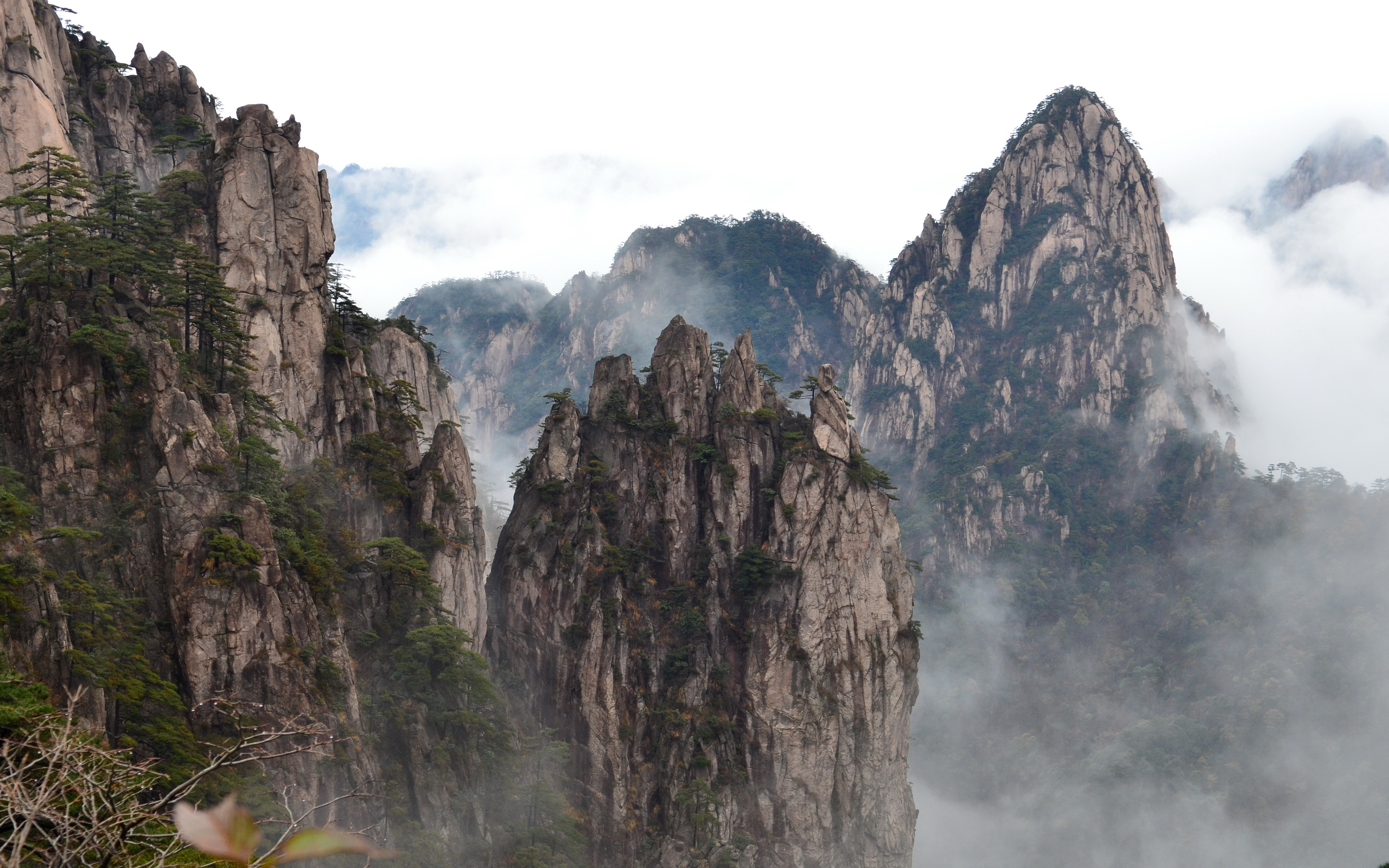
Huangshan

Li River in Guangxi

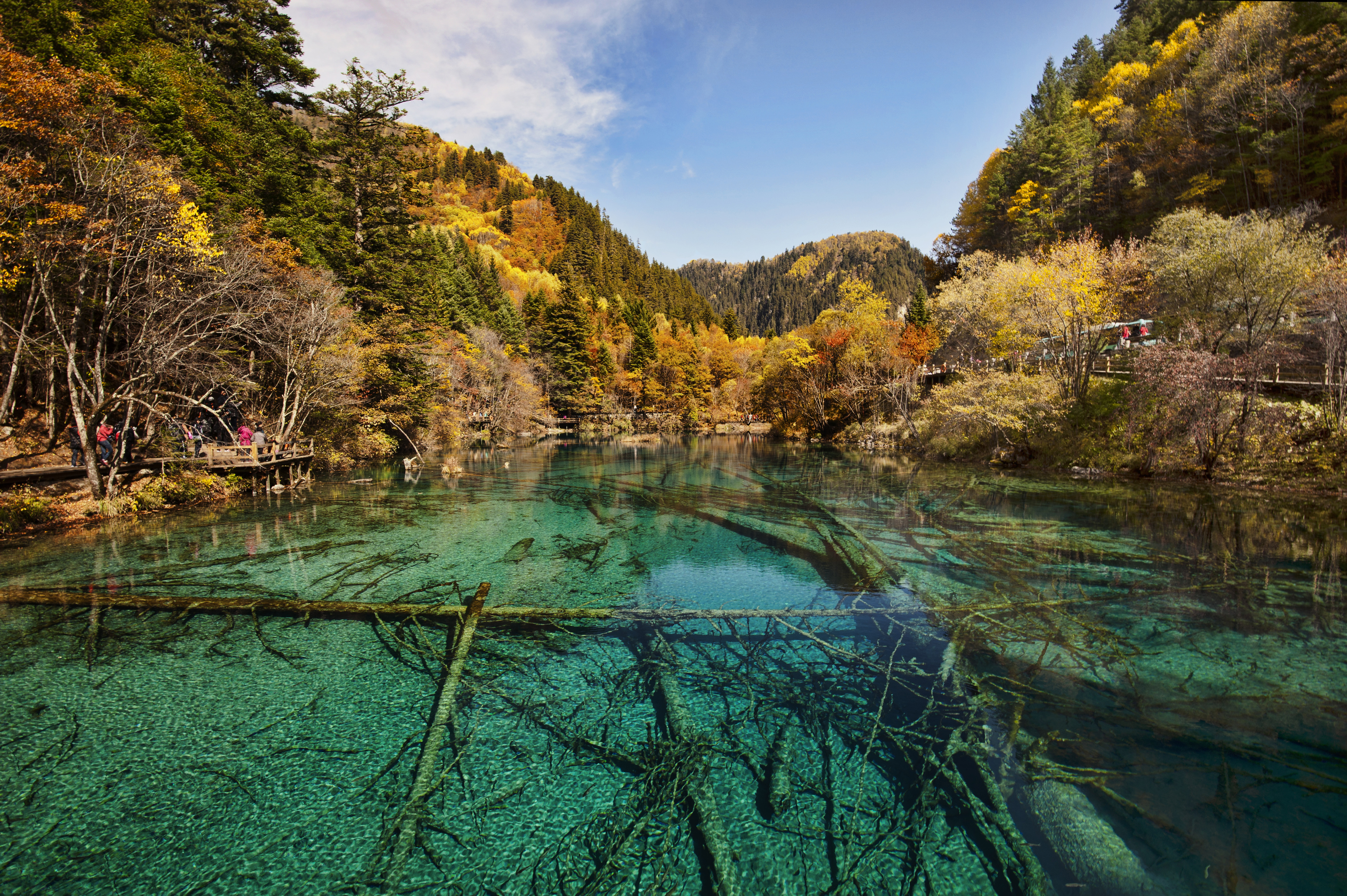
Jiuzhaigou Valley

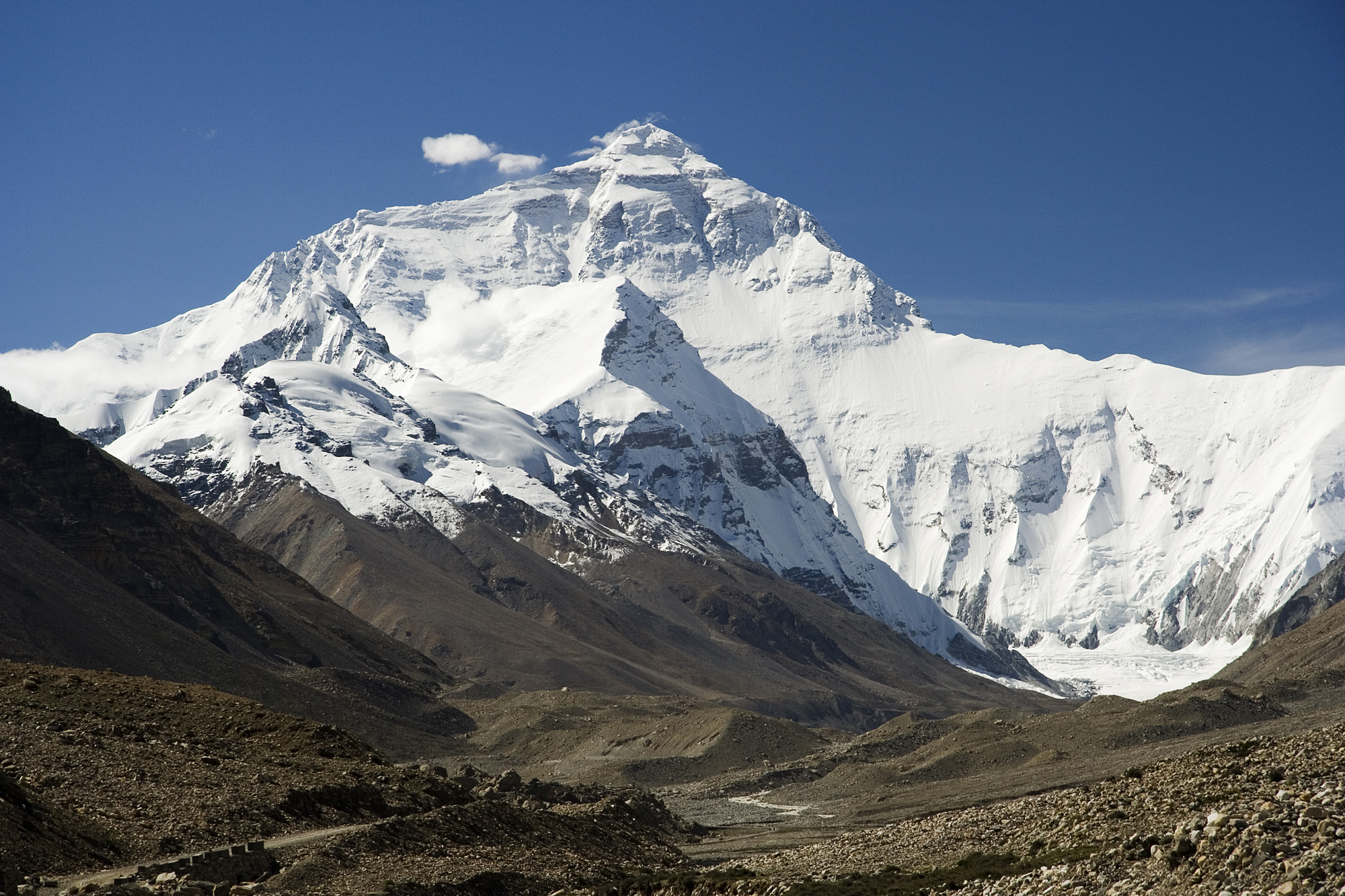
The north face of Mount Everest

=== Eastern China ===
Eastern (Monsoon) China (Chinese: 东部季风区) accounts for about 45 per cent of China's area and 95 per cent of its population. The climate of Eastern China is humid or subhumid, with sharp seasonal variations under the influence of the East Asian Monsoon. This region contains large stretches of alluvial plains such as the North China Plain and the Northeast China Plain. Forest is the primary natural vegetation type of this region. From north to south, forest types include taiga, temperate mixed needleleaf and broadleaf forest, temperate deciduous broadleaf forest, subtropical mixed evergreen and deciduous broadleaf forest, tropical monsoon forest, and rainforest. Almost all arable land in the region has been cultivated, and almost all natural vegetation has been modified by human activity.

==== Northeast China Plain ====
Northeast of Shanhaiguan a narrow sliver of flat coastal land opens up into the vast Northeast China Plain. The plains extend north to the crown of the "Chinese rooster", near where the Greater and Lesser Hinggan ranges converge. The Changbai Mountains to the east divide China from the Korean peninsula.

==== North China Plain ====
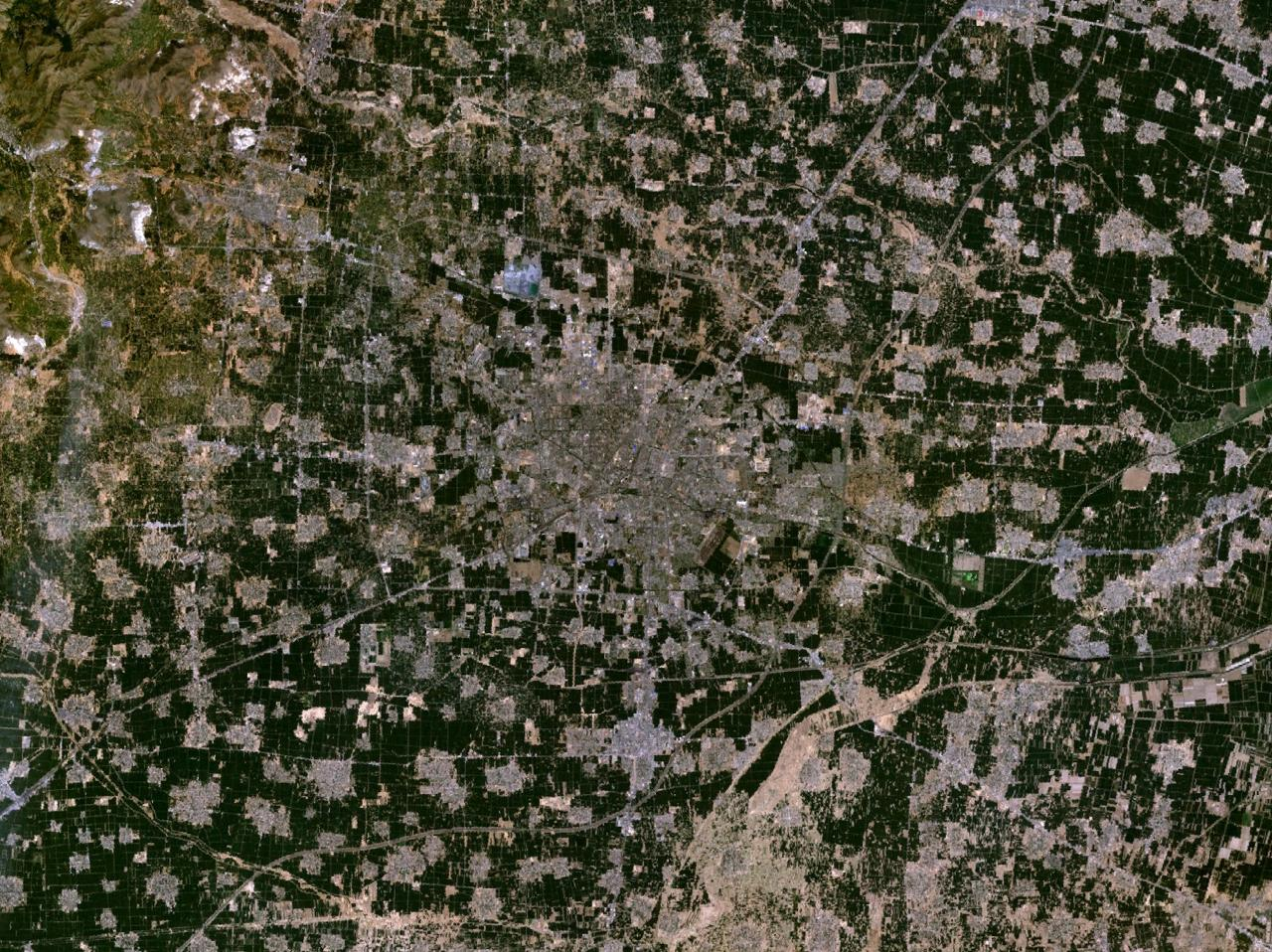
Satellite image of Baoding and vicinities on the North China Plain

The Taihang Mountains form the western side of the triangular North China Plain. The other two sides are the Pacific coast to the east and the Yangtze River to the southwest. The vertices of this triangle are Beijing to the north, Shanghai to the southeast, and Yichang to the southwest. This alluvial plain, fed by the Yellow and Yangtze Rivers, is one of the most heavily populated regions of China. The only mountains in the plain are the Taishan in Shandong and Dabie Mountains of Anhui.

Beijing, at the north tip of the North China Plain, is shielded by the intersection of the Taihang and Yan Mountains. Further north are the drier grasslands of the Inner Mongolian Plateau, traditionally home to pastoralists. To the south are agricultural regions, traditionally home to sedentary populations. The Great Wall of China was built across the mountains that mark the southern edge of the Inner Mongolian Plateau. The Ming-era walls run over 2,000 km (1,200 mi) east to west from Shanhaiguan on the Bohai coast to the Hexi Corridor in Gansu.

==== Loess Plateau ====
Between the Qinling and the Inner Mongolian Plateau is Loess Plateau, the largest of its kind in the world, covering 650,000 km^{2} (250,000 sq mi) in Shaanxi, parts of Gansu and Shanxi provinces, and some of Ningxia-Hui Autonomous Region. The plateau is 1,000–1,500m in elevation and is filled with loess, a yellowish, loose soil that travels easily in the wind. Eroded loess silt gives the Yellow River its color and name. The Loess Plateau is bound to the east by the Luliang Mountain of Shanxi, which has a narrow basin running north to south along the Fen River. Further east are the Taihang Mountains of Hebei, the dominant topographical feature of North China.

==== Southern hills ====
East of the Tibetan Plateau, deeply folded mountains fan out toward the Sichuan Basin, which is ringed by mountains with 1,000–3,000 m elevation. The floor of the basin has an average elevation of 500 m and is home to one of the most densely farmed and populated regions of China. The Sichuan Basin is capped in the north by the eastward continuation of the Kunlun range, the Qinling, and the Dabashan. The Qinling and Dabashan ranges form a major north–south divide across China Proper, the traditional core area of China. Southeast of the Tibetan Plateau and south of the Sichuan Basin is the Yunnan–Guizhou Plateau, which occupies much of southwest China. This plateau, with an average elevation of 2,000 m, is known for its limestone karst landscape.

South of the Yangtze, the landscape is more rugged. Like Shanxi Province to the north, Hunan and Jiangxi each have a provincial core in a river basin that is surrounded by mountains. The Wuling range separates Guizhou from Hunan. The Luoxiao and Jinggang divide Hunan from Jiangxi, which is separated from Fujian by the Wuyi Mountains. The southeast coastal provinces, Zhejiang, Fujian and Guangdong, have rugged coasts, with pockets of lowland and mountainous interior shaped by the Southeast Hills, especially Zhejiang–Fujian Hills. The Nanling is an east–west trending mountain range across northern Guangdong that separates Guangdong from Hunan and Jiangxi. It forms part of the broader Liangguang Hills spanning much of Guangdong and Guangxi, creating predominantly mountainous terrain with extensive karst influence.

Eastern China

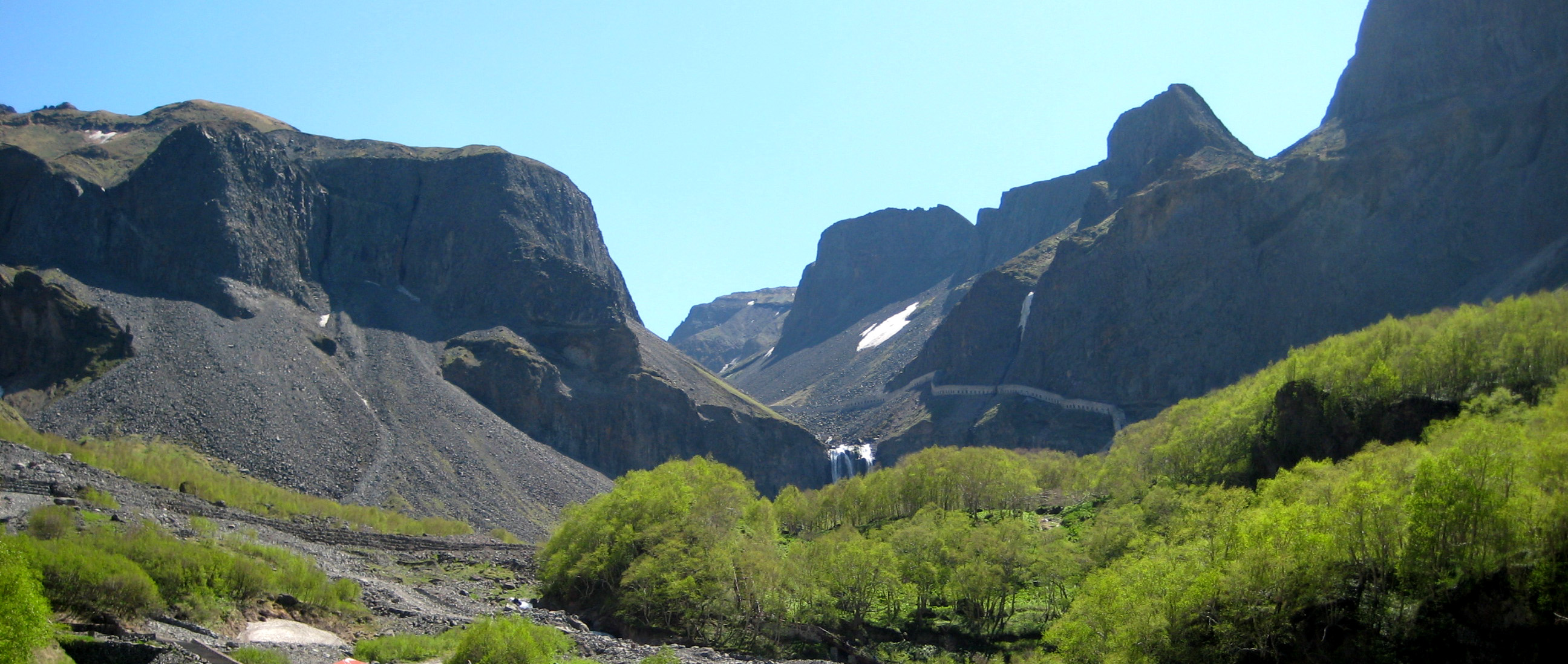
North slope of Mount Changbai in Jilin, on the border with North Korea

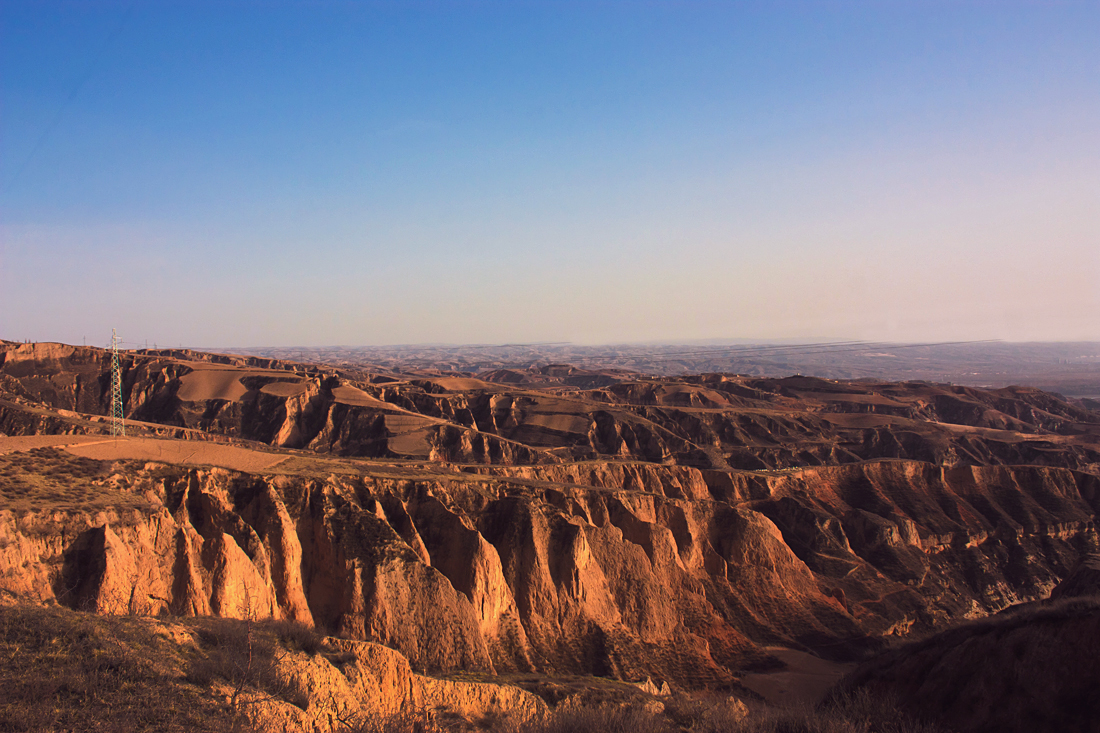
The Loess Plateau in Hequ County, Shanxi

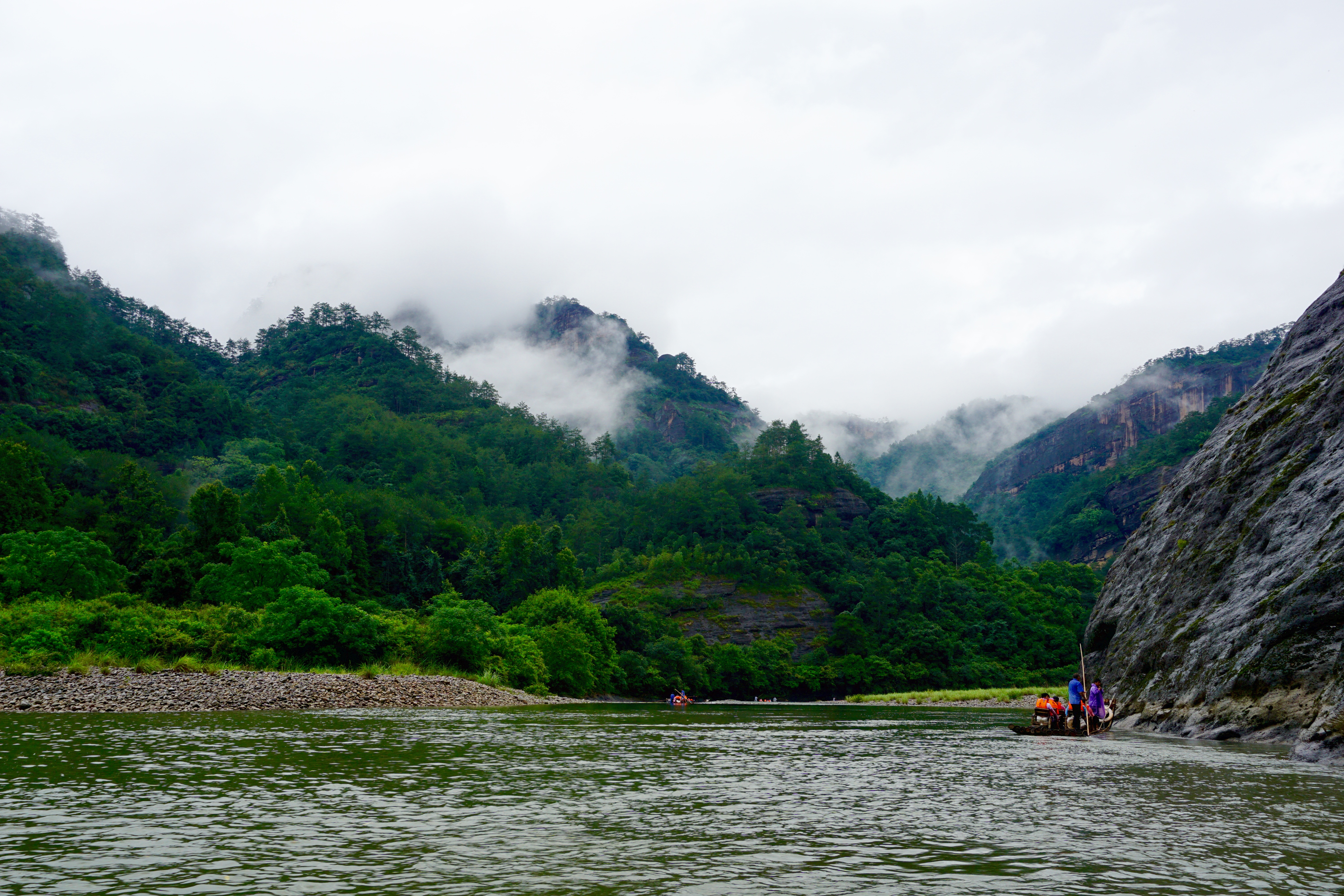
Wuyi Mountains, Fujian

Wulingyuan, Hunan

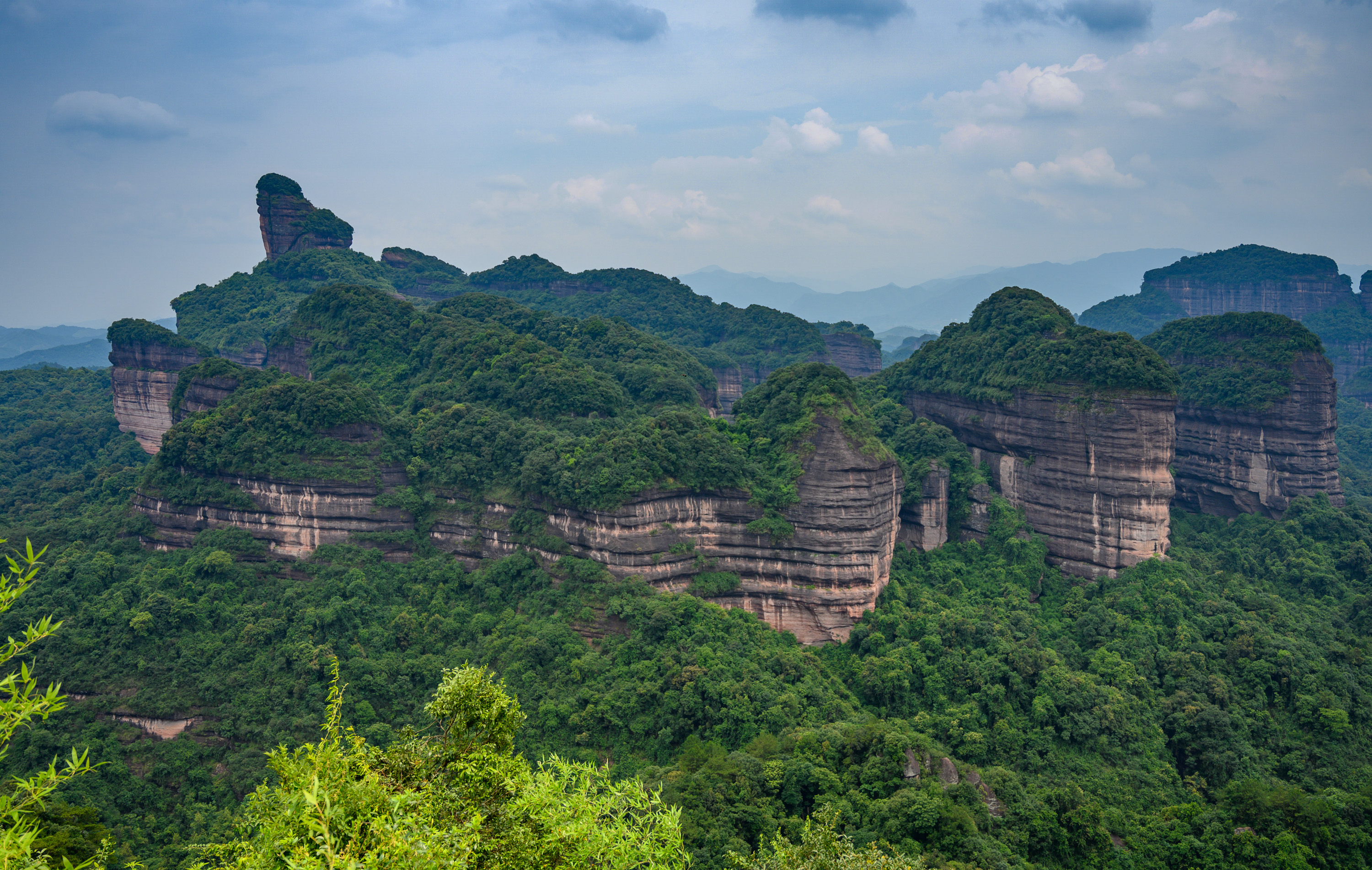
Mount Danxia, Guangdong

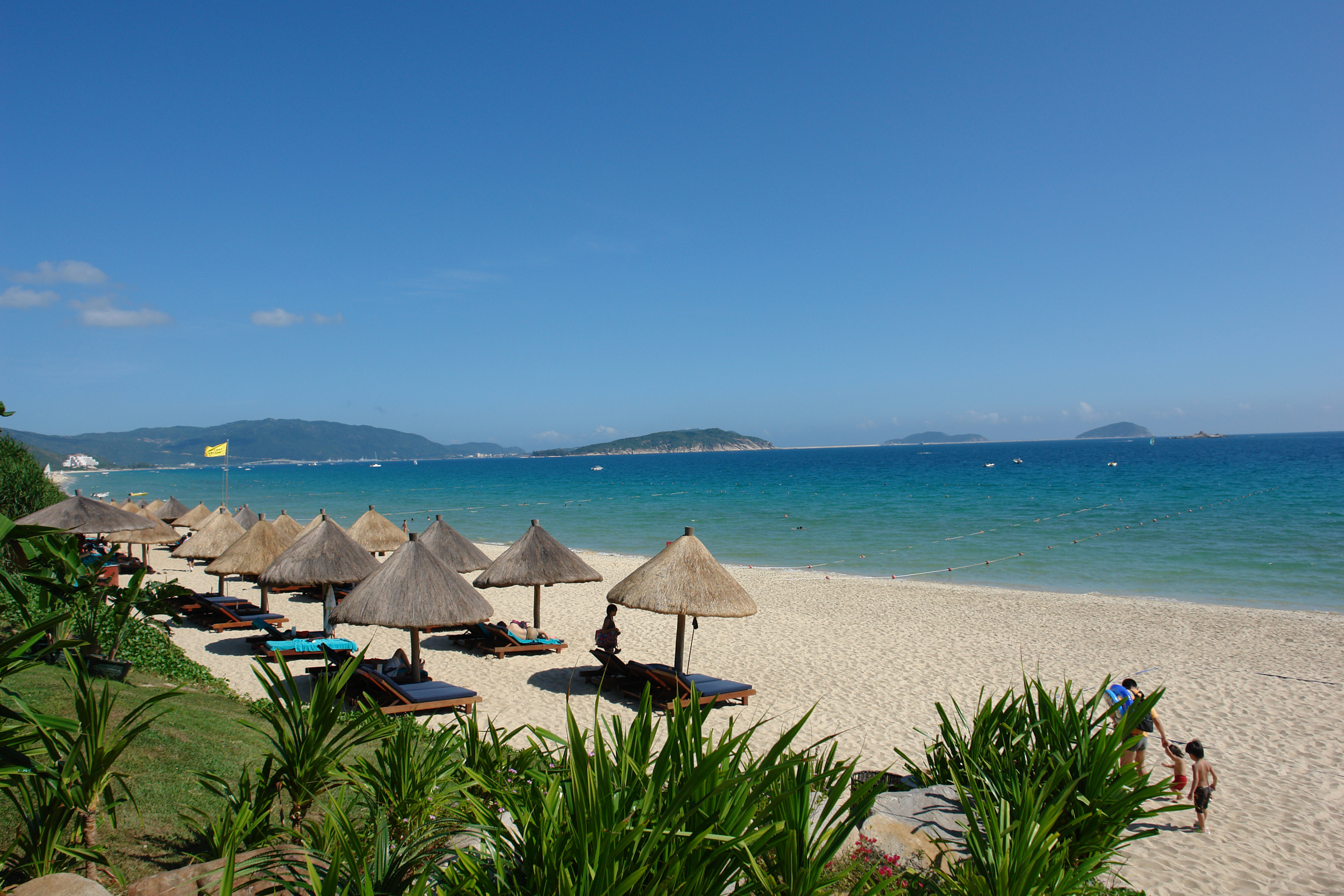
Sanya, Hainan by the South China Sea

=== Northwest China ===
Northwest (Arid) China (Chinese: 西北干旱区) accounts for about 30 per cent of China's area and 4 per cent of its population. It mainly consists of plateaus and inland basins covered by grasslands and deserts, while a portion of the area is occupied by high mountains such as the Tian Shan and the Altai Mountains. Most of Northwest China is endorheic, with a small number of perennial rivers fed by snowmelt and glaciers, and numerous lakes. The grasslands are used for pasture and many oases have been extensively developed for agriculture.

Northwest of the Tibetan Plateau, between the northern slope of Kunlun and southern slope of Tian Shan, is the vast Tarim Basin of Xinjiang, which contains the Taklamakan Desert. The Tarim Basin, the largest in China, measures 1,500 km (930 mi) from east to west and 600 km (370 mi) from north to south at its widest parts. Average elevation in the basin is 1,000 m. To the east, the basin descends into the Hami-Turpan Depression of eastern Xinjiang, where the dried lake bed of Lake Ayding, at −154m below sea level, is the lowest surface point in China and the third-lowest in the world. With temperatures that have reached 49.6 C., the lake bed ranks as one of the hottest places in China. North of Tian Shan is Xinjiang's second great basin, the Junggar, which contains the Gurbantünggüt Desert. The Junggar Basin is enclosed to the north by the Altay Mountains, which separate Xinjiang from Russia and Mongolia.

Northeast of the Tibetan Plateau, the Altun Shan–Qilian Mountains range branches off the Kunlun and creates a parallel mountain range running east–west. In between in northern Qinghai is the Qaidam Basin, with elevations of 2,600–3,000 m and numerous brackish and salt lakes. North of the Qilian is Hexi Corridor of Gansu, a natural passage between Xinjiang and China Proper that was part of the ancient Silk Road and traversed by modern highway and rail lines to Xinjiang. Further north, the Inner Mongolian Plateau, between 900 and 1,500 m in elevation, arcs north up the spine of China and becomes the Greater Hinggan Range of Northeast China.

Northwestern China

Crescent Lake in the Gobi Desert near Dunhuang, Gansu

Bayanbulak Grassland, Xinjiang

Lake Tianchi in the Tian Shan, Xinjiang

=== Tibetan Plateau ===
The Tibetan Plateau accounts for about 25 per cent of China's area and less than 1 per cent of its population. It is a high plateau with an elevation of over 4,000 metres (13,100 ft) interspersed with several high mountain ranges. The region contains the headwaters of several major rivers of Asia, including the Yangtze, the Yellow River and the Brahmaputra. The Tibetan Plateau has rich flora and fauna with clear altitudinal zonation.

==== Highlands ====
The world's tallest mountains, the Karakorum, Pamirs and Tian Shan divide China from South and Central Asia. Eleven of the seventeen tallest mountain peaks on Earth are located on China's western borders. They include the world's tallest peak Mount Everest (8848 m) in the Himalayas on the border with Nepal and the world's second tallest peak, K2 (8611 m) on the border with Pakistan. From these towering heights in the west, the land descends in steps like a terrace.

North of the Himalayas and east of the Karakorum/Pamirs is the vast Tibetan Plateau. It is the largest and highest plateau in the world, and for this reason is also informally known as the "Roof of the World". Its average elevation is 4000 meters above sea level. Its area is 2.5 million square kilometers which is just over a quarter of China's total area. In the north, the plateau is hemmed in by the Kunlun Mountains, which extends eastward from the intersection of the Pamirs, Karakorum and Tian Shan.

==== Tallest mountain peaks ====
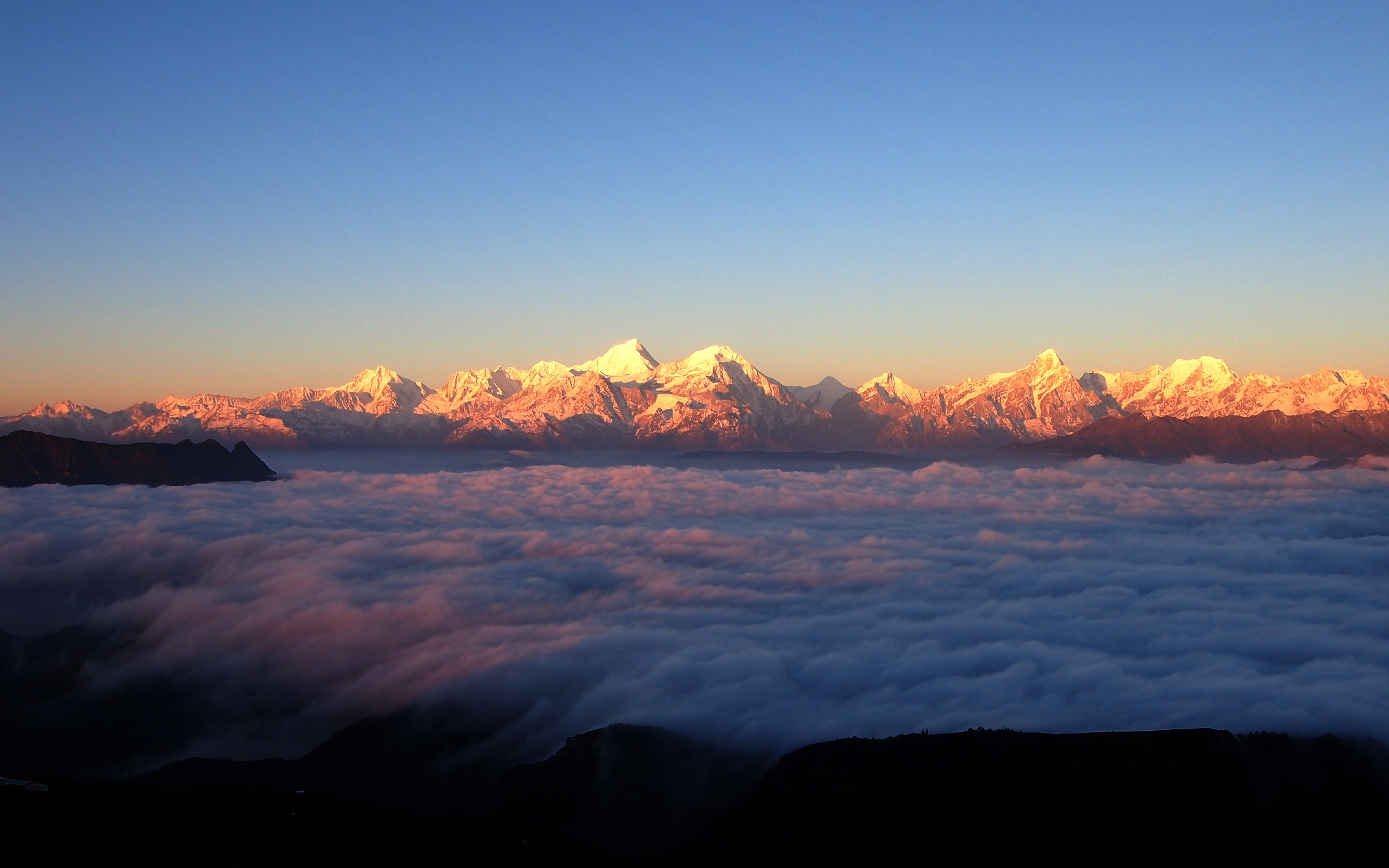
Daxue Mountains, Sichuan

Besides Mt. Everest and K2, the other 9 of the world's 17 tallest peaks on China's western borders are: Lhotse (8516 m, 4th highest), Makalu (8485 m, 5th), Cho Oyu (8188 m, 6th), Gyachung Kang (7952 m, 15th) of the Himalayas on the border with Nepal and Gasherbrum I (8080 m, 11th), Broad Peak (8051 m, 12th), Gasherbrum II (8035 m, 13th), Gasherbrum III (7946 m, 16th) and Gasherbrum IV (7932 m, 17th) of the Karakorum on the border with Pakistan. The tallest peak entirely within China is Shishapangma (8013 m, 14th) of the Tibetan Himalayas in Nyalam County of Tibet Autonomous Region. In all, 9 of the 14 mountain peaks in the world over 8,000 m are in or on the border of China. Another notable Himalayan peak in China is Namchabarwa (7782 m, 28th), near the great bend of the Yarlungtsanpo (upper Brahmaputra) River in eastern Tibet, and considered to be the eastern anchor of the Himalayas.

Outside the Himalayas and Karakorum, China's tallest peaks are Kongur Tagh (7649 m, 37th) and Muztagh Ata (7546 m, 43rd) in the Pamirs of western Xinjiang, Gongga Shan (7556 m, 41st) in the Daxue Mountains of western Sichuan; and Tömür Shan (7439 m, 60th), the highest peak of Tian Shan, on the border with Kyrgyzstan.

Tibetan Plateau

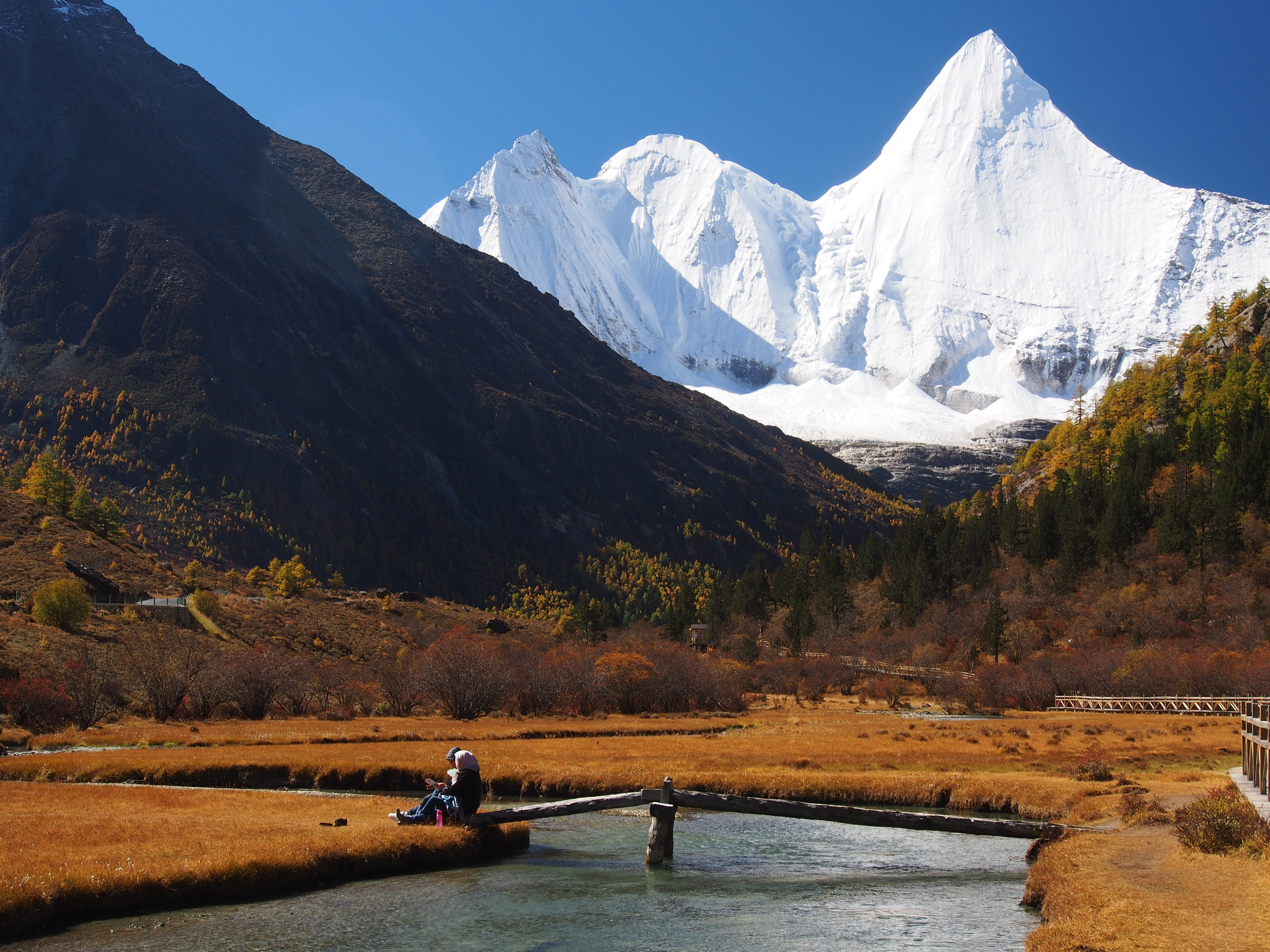
Yading Nature Reserve in Sichuan

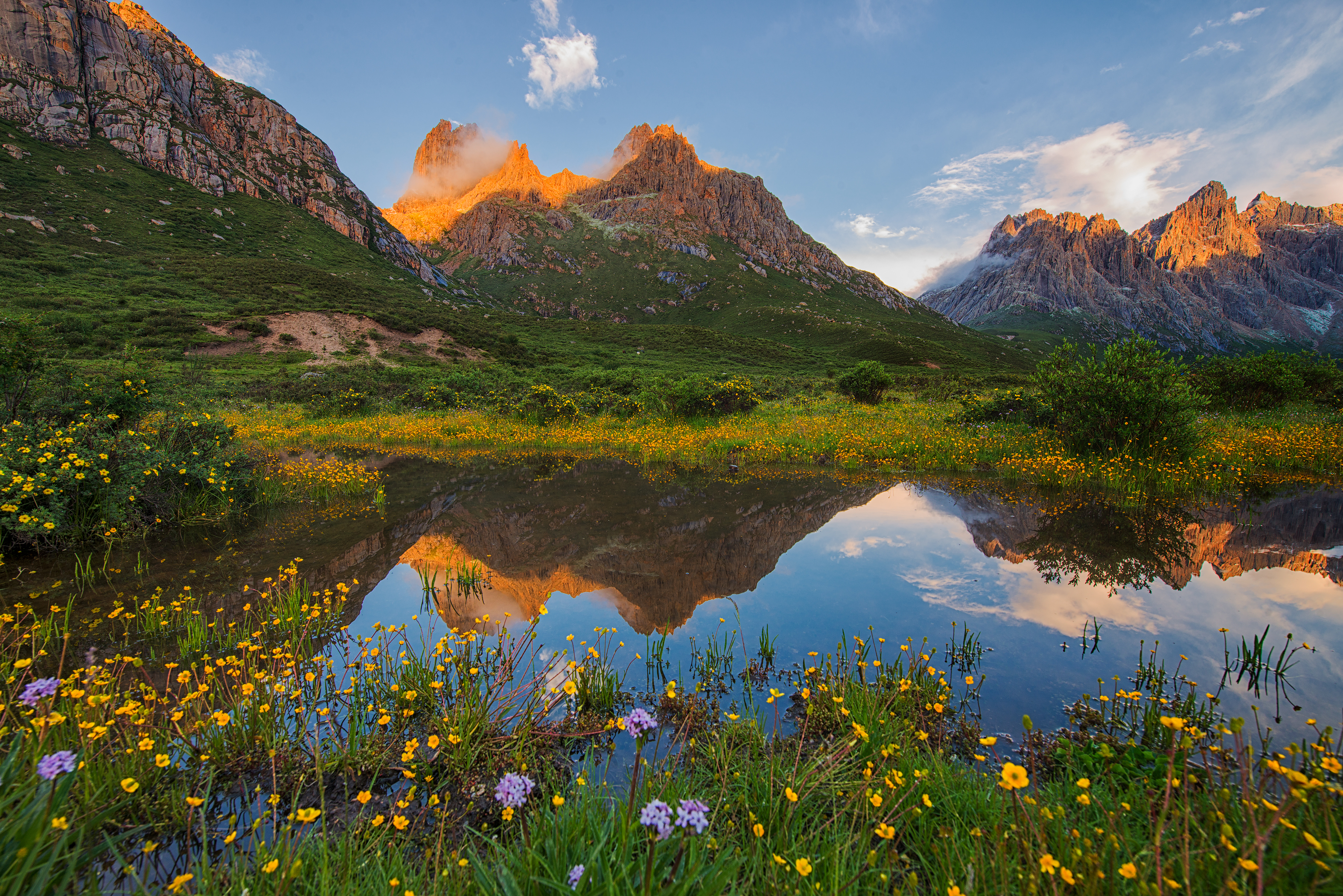
Nyenpo Yurtse Geopark, Qinghai

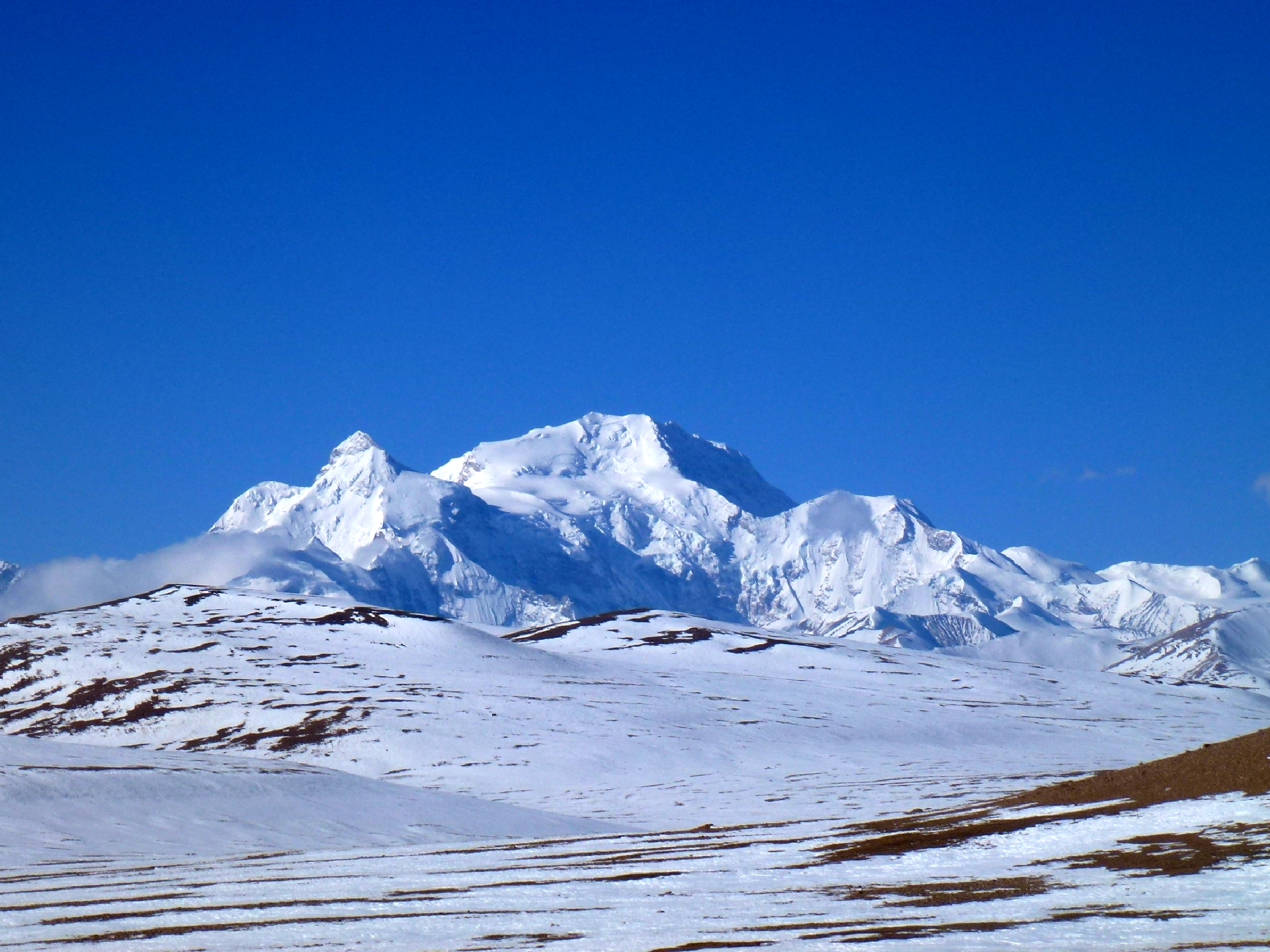
Shishapangma of the Tibetan Himalayas, the tallest peak entirely within China

=== Rivers ===
Main rivers of China

China originally had an estimated number of 50,000 rivers. However, due to statistical discrepancies, water and soil loss, and climate change, there are currently only an estimated 22,000 rivers remaining. The rivers in China have a total length of 420,000 kilometers. 1,500 have a catchment area exceeding 1,000 square kilometers. The majority of rivers flow west to east into the Pacific Ocean. The Yangtze (Chang Jiang) rises in Tibet, flows through Central China and enters the East China Sea near Shanghai. The Yangtze is 6,300 kilometers long and has a catchment area of 1.8 million square kilometers. It is the third longest river in the world, after the Amazon and the Nile. The second longest river in China is the Huang He (Yellow River). It rises in Tibet and travels circuitously for 5,464 kilometers through North China, it empties into the Bo Hai Gulf on the north coast of the Shandong Province. It has a catchment area of 752,000 square kilometers. The Heilongjiang (Heilong or Black Dragon River) flows for 3,101 kilometers in Northeast China and an additional 1,249 kilometers in Russia, where it is known as the Amur. The longest river in South China is the Zhujiang (Pearl River), which is 2,214 kilometers long. Along with its three tributaries, the Xi (West), Dong (East), and Bei (North) rivers, it forms the Pearl River Delta near Guangzhou, Zhuhai, Macau, and Hong Kong. Other major rivers are the Liaohe in the northeast, Haihe in the north, Qiantang in the east, and Lancang in the southwest.

Inland drainage involving upland basins in the north and northeast accounts for 40 percent of the country's total drainage area. Many rivers and streams flow into lakes or diminish in the desert. Some are used for irrigation.

China's territorial waters are principally marginal seas of the western Pacific Ocean. These waters lie on the indented coastline of the mainland and approximately 5,000 islands. The Yellow Sea, East China Sea, and South China Sea are marginal seas of the Pacific Ocean. More than half the coastline, predominantly in the south, is rocky; most of the remainder is sandy. The Bay of Hangzhou roughly divides the two kinds of shoreline.

Rivers of China

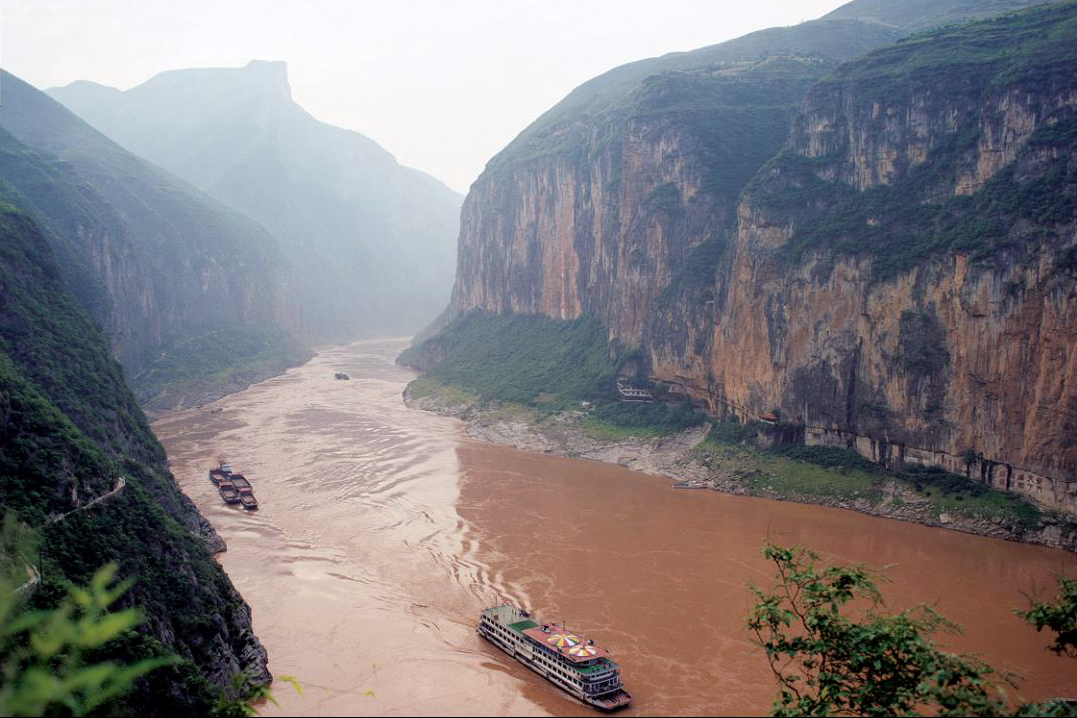
Qutang Gorge, one of the Three Gorges of the Yangtze

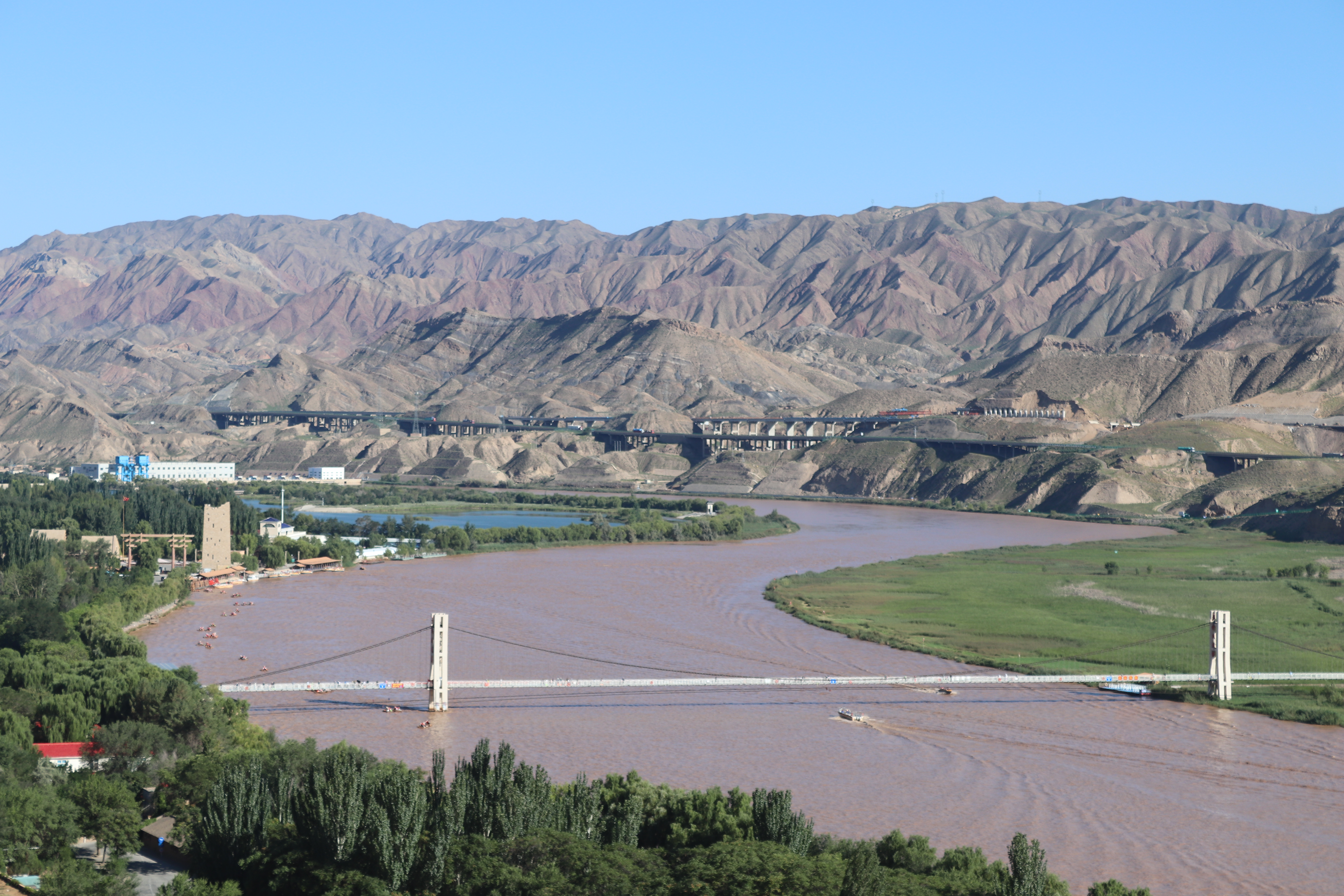
The Yellow River in Ningxia

The Pearl River at Humen, Guangdong

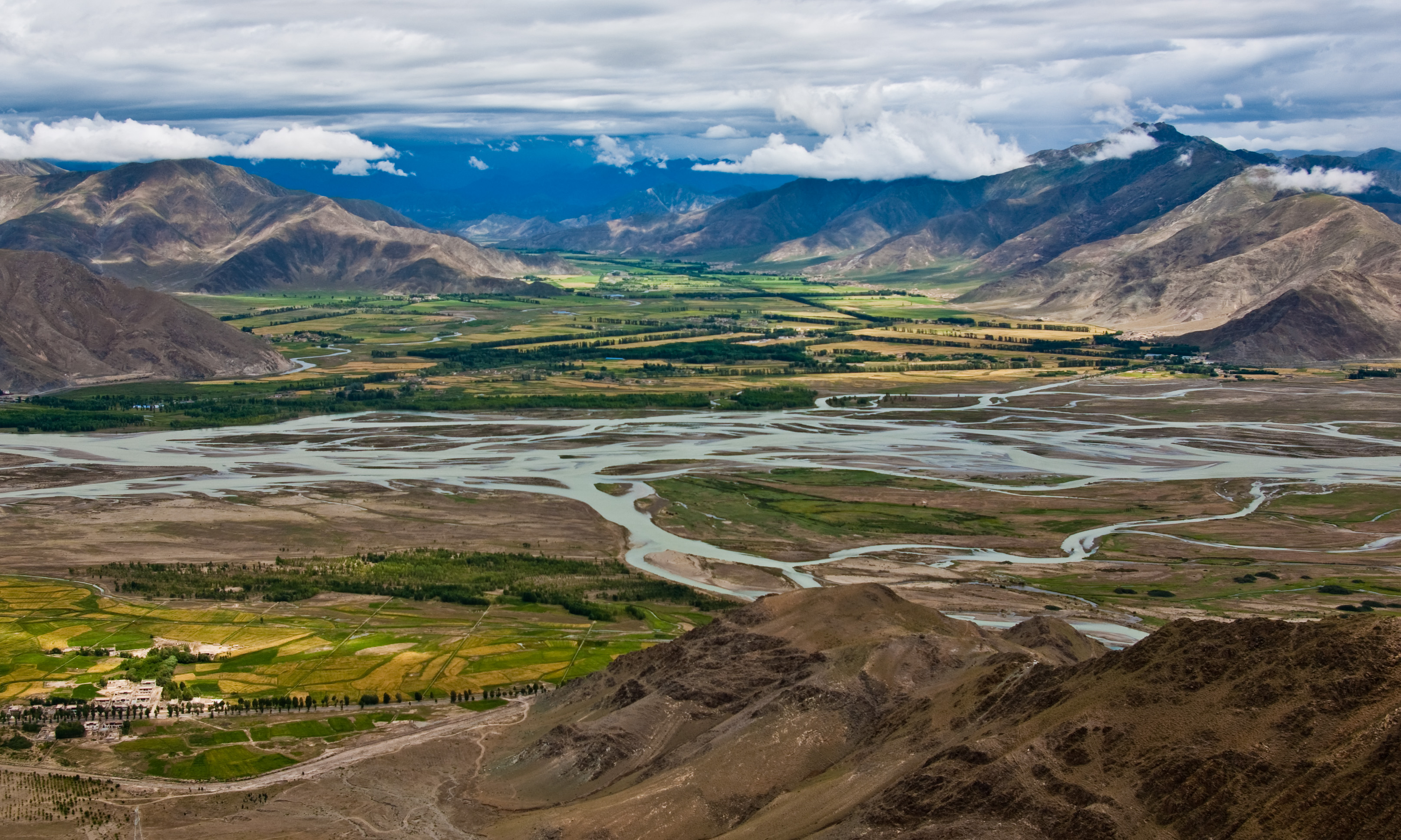
The Yarlung Tsangpo River in Tibet

==== Northern China ====
There is a steep drop in the river level in the North China Plain, where the river continues across the delta, it transports a heavy load of sand and mud which is deposited on the flat plain. The flow is aided by manmade embankments. As a result, the river flows on a raised ridge fifty meters above the plain. Waterlogging, floods, and course changes have recurred over the centuries. Traditionally, rulers were judged by their concern for or indifference to preservation of the embankments. In the modern era, China has undertaken extensive flood control and conservation measures.

Flowing from its source in the Qingzang highlands, the Yellow River courses toward the sea through the North China Plain, the historic center of Chinese expansion and influence. Han Chinese people have farmed the rich alluvial soils since ancient times, constructing the Grand Canal for north–south transport during the Imperial Era. The plain is a continuation of the Dongbei (Manchurian) Plain to the northeast but is separated from it by the Bohai Gulf, an extension of the Yellow Sea.

Like other densely populated areas of China, the plain is subject to floods and earthquakes. The mining and industrial center of Tangshan, 165 km (103 mi) east of Beijing, was leveled by an earthquake in July 1976, it was believed to be the largest earthquake of the 20th century by death toll.

The Hai River, like the Yangtze River, flows from west to east. Its upper course consists of five rivers that converge near Tianjin, then flow seventy kilometers before emptying into the Bohai Gulf. The Huai River, rises in Henan Province and flows through several lakes before joining the Yangtze River near Yangzhou.

==== Southern China ====
The Qin Mountains, a continuation of the Kunlun Mountains, divides the North China Plain from the Yangtze River Delta and is the major physiographic boundary between the two great parts of China Proper. It is a cultural boundary as it influences the distribution of customs and language. South of the Qinling mountain range divide are the densely populated and highly developed areas of the lower and middle plains of the Yangtze River and, on its upper reaches, the Sichuan Basin, an area encircled by a high barrier of mountain ranges.

The country's longest and most important waterway, the Yangtze River, is navigable for the majority of its length and has a vast hydroelectric potential. Rising on the Qingzang Plateau, the Yangtze River traverses 6,300 km (3,900 mi) through the heart of the country, draining an area of 1,800,000 km^{2} (690,000 sq mi) before emptying into the East China Sea. Roughly 300 million people live along its middle and lower reaches. The area is a large producer of rice and wheat. The Sichuan Basin, due to its mild, humid climate and long growing season, produces a variety of crops. It is a leading silk-producing area and an important industrial region with substantial mineral resources.

The Nanling Mountains, the southernmost of the east–west mountain ranges, overlook areas in China with a tropical climate. The climate allows two crops of rice to be grown per year. Southeast of the mountains lies a coastal, hilly region of small deltas and narrow valley plains. The drainage area of the Pearl River and its associated network of rivers occupies much of the region to the south. West of the Nanling, the Yunnan–Guizhou Plateau rises in two steps, averaging 1,200 and 1,800 m in elevation, respectively, toward the precipitous mountain regions of the eastern Tibetan Plateau. There, the upper reaches of the Yangtze, Lancang (Mekong) and Nu (Salween) rivers, known as the Three Parallel Rivers, run in close proximity to each other across the Hengduan Mountains.

=== Geology and natural resources ===
China has substantial mineral reserves and is the world's largest producer of antimony, natural graphite, tungsten, and zinc. Other major minerals are aluminum, bauxite, coal, crude petroleum, diamonds, gold, iron ore, lead, magnetite, manganese, mercury, molybdenum, natural gas, phosphate rock, tin, uranium, and vanadium. China's hydropower potential is the largest in the world.

=== Land use ===
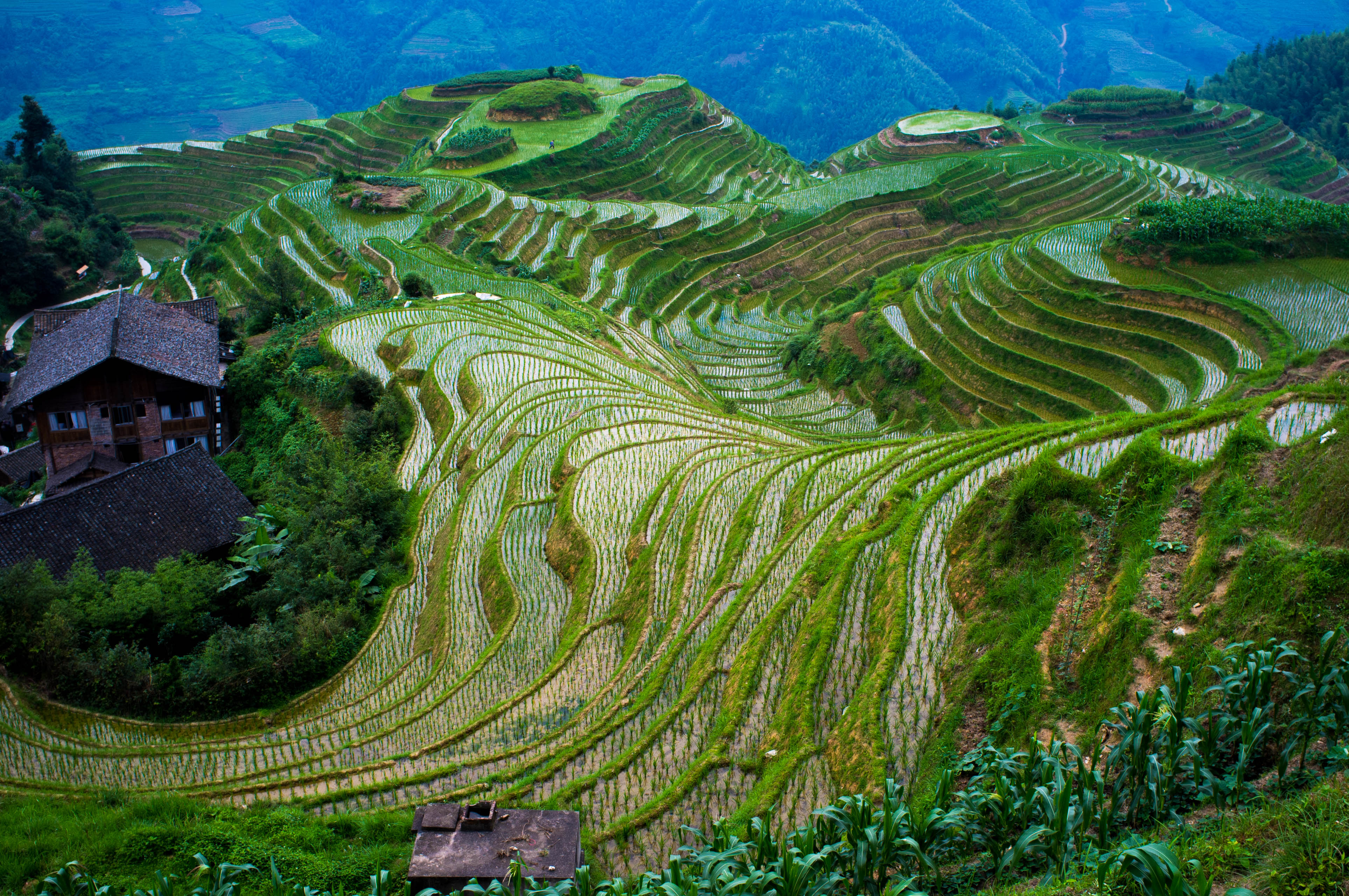
Longsheng Rice Terraces, Guangxi

Based on 2005 estimates, 14.86% (about 1,400,000 km^{2} (540,000 sq mi)) of China's total land area is arable. About 1.3% (some 116,580 km^{2}) is planted to permanent crops and the rest planted to temporary crops. With comparatively little land planted to permanent crops, intensive agricultural techniques are used to reap harvests that are sufficient to feed the world's largest population and still have surplus for export. An estimated 544,784 km^{2} of land were irrigated in 2004. 42.9% of total land area was used as pasture, and 17.5% was forest.

=== Deserts ===
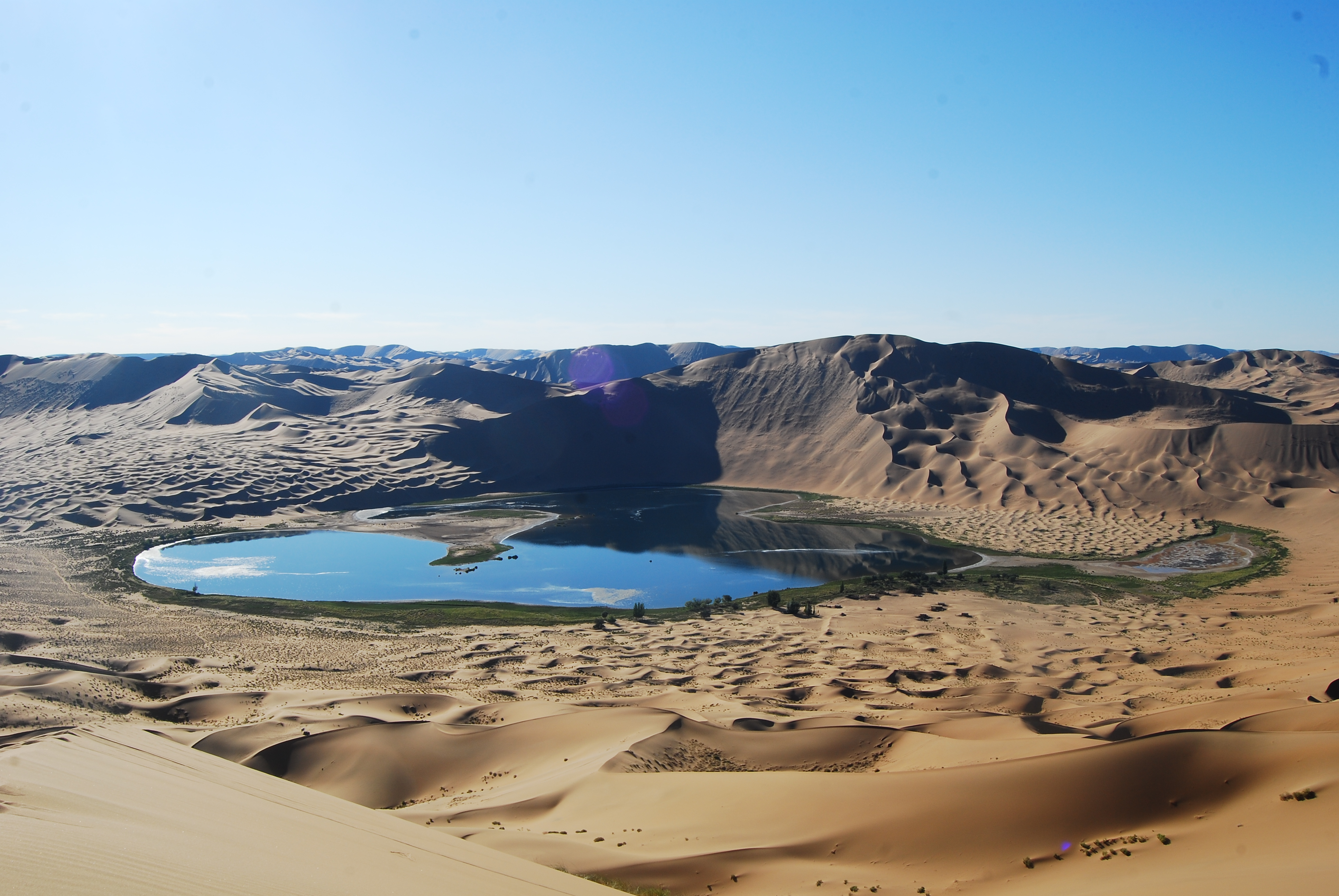
Oasis in the Badain Jaran Desert

Nearly 20 percent of China (about 1,900,000 km2) is desert:

1. Gobi Desert and Hami Desert – 1,295,000 km2 (with Mongolia)
2. Dzungaria – 777,000 km2
3. Taklamakan Desert – 337,000 km2
4. Ordos Desert – 215,952 km2
5. Lop Desert – 50,000 km2
6. Gurbantünggüt Desert – 50,000 km2
7. Mu Us Desert – 48,288 km2
8. Badain Jaran Desert – 49,000 km2
9. Tengger Desert – 36,700 km2
10. Kubuqi Desert – 18,600 km2
11. Shapotou, Zhongwei – 5,380 km2
12. Kumtag Desert – 2,600 km2

=== Wildlife ===
China lies in two of the world's major ecozones, the Palearctic and the Indomalaya. In the Palearctic zone mammals such as the horse, camel, and jerboa are found. Among the species found in the Indomalaya region are the leopard cat, bamboo rat, treeshrew, and various other species of monkeys and apes. Some overlap exists between the two regions because of natural dispersal and migration, and deer or antelope, bears, wolves, pigs, and rodents are found in all of the diverse climatic and geological environments. The famous giant panda is found only in a limited area along the Yangtze. There is a continuing problem with trade in endangered species, although there are now laws to prohibit such activities.

== Human geography ==
=== History ===
Macro areas in East Asian history

Chinese history is often explained in terms of several strategic areas, defined by particular topographic limits. Starting from the Chinese Central Plain and the Loess Plateau, the former heart of the Han populations, the Han people expanded militarily and then demographically toward the Sichuan Basin, and the Southern Hills (as defined by the map on the left), not without resistance from local populations. The Han continued their expansion by military and demographic waves and via assimilation of native populations such as the Baiyue. The Lingnan region (present-day South China and northern Vietnam), Yunnan and the Tarim Basin were first reached and durably controlled by the Han dynasty's armies. The Northern steppes were frequently the source of invasions into China, which culminated in the 13th century by the Mongol conquest of China and the creation of the Yuan dynasty. Northern Manchuria and the Korean Peninsula were usually not under Chinese control, with the exception of some limited periods of occupation. Manchuria became strongly integrated into the Chinese empire during the Qing dynasty and demographically transformed by the mass migration known as Chuang Guandong during the 19th and 20th centuries.

=== Demographic geography ===
A population density map of the territories governed by the PRC and the ROC. The eastern, coastal provinces are much more densely populated than the western interior because of the historical access to water.

The demographic occupation follows the topography and availability of former arable lands. The Heihe–Tengchong Line, running from Heihe, Heilongjiang to Tengchong County, Yunnan divides China into two roughly equal sections–in terms of geographic area, with areas west of the line being sparsely settled and areas east densely populated, in general. Today there are 5 major religions that have been recognized by the state; Buddhism, Taoism, Protestantism, Catholicism, and Islam. Buddhism and folk religions account for roughly 21% of the population while Protestants make up 5% and Islam 1.6% of the population. A substantial number of Buddhists live in the southwestern Tibetan region of the country which borders Nepal, Bangladesh, and Bhutan and most notably India, the birthplace of Buddhism. The Islamic population, consisting mostly of Hui and Uighur Muslims, is concentrated in the northwestern Xinjiang region of the country which shares borders with Mongolia, Kazakhstan, Kyrgyzstan, Tajikistan, Afghanistan, Pakistan, India, and Russia.

=== Administrative geography ===
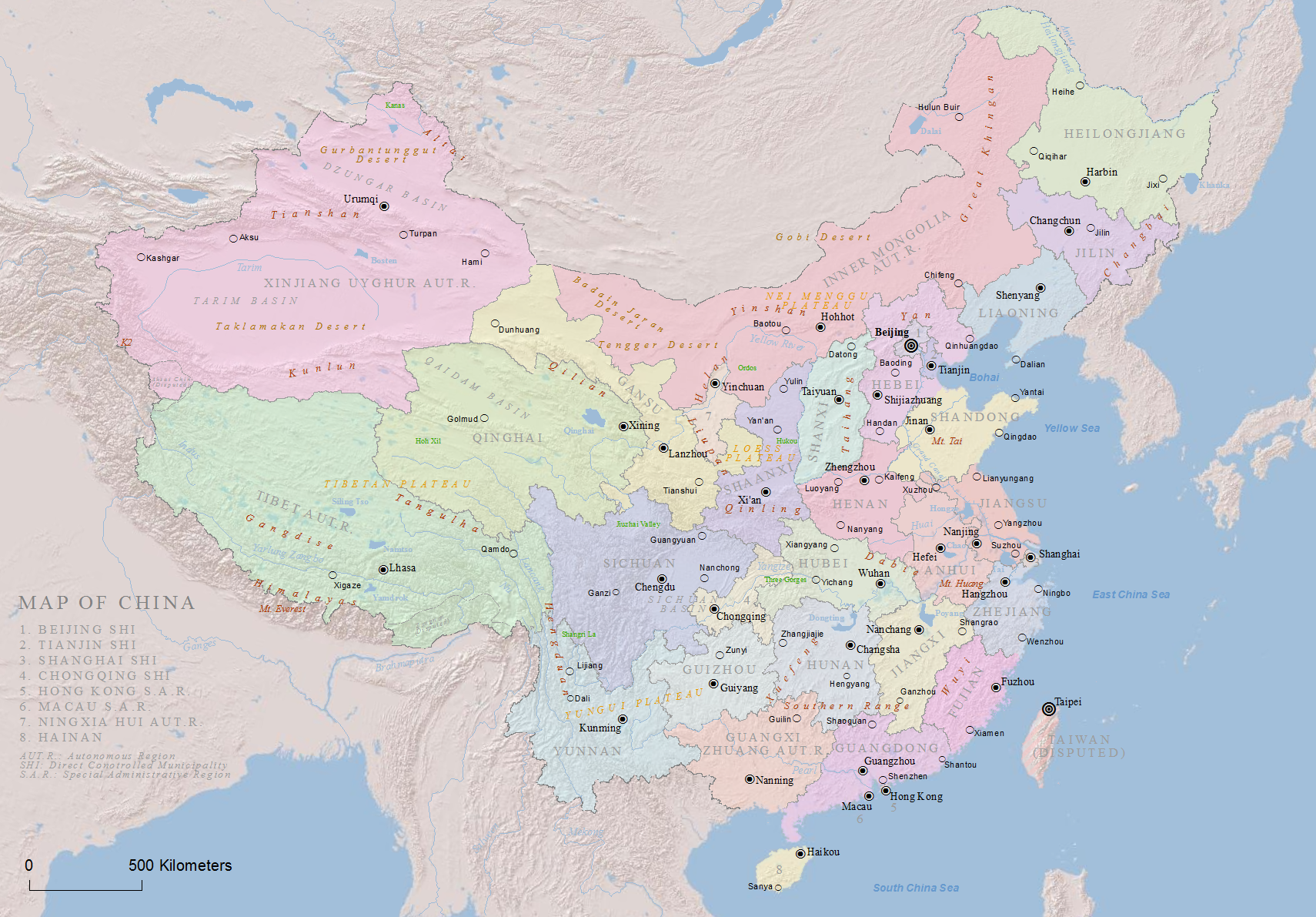
Administrative map of China

Chinese administrative geography was drawn mainly during the 1949 and 1954 administrative reorganizations. These reorganizations have been the source of much debate within China. In addition, a parcel of land was ceded from Guangdong to Guangxi to grant the latter immediate access to the Gulf of Tonkin, while Hainan was split from Guangdong in 1988 and Chongqing from Sichuan in 1997.

=== Agriculture ===
As the country continues to industrialize, the share of agriculture as a part of China's GDP has lowered to 11% in recent years. Of the enormous labor force in China, 27.7% work in agriculture. China's primary agricultural import is wheat from Argentina, Australia, Canada, and France. They import about four to five million metric tons of wheat per year and they are able to buy the wheat for about $700 per ton, making wheat China's most important agricultural import. On the other hand, China's most important agricultural export is rice. China exports about 750,000 metric tons of rice per year for about $1200 per ton. Other significant agricultural exports from China are potatoes, corn, tobacco, peanuts, tea, apples, cotton, pork, mutton, eggs, fish, and shrimp.

According to the World Bank, as of 2015, China's total arable land was estimated at 119,000,000 hectares. Since 2005, arable land in China has been on the decline and the total arable land per citizen has reached .2 acres. As a percentage, agricultural land makes up about 54.7% of land. The climate of the country is difficult to describe because it varies so much depending on the region of China. The southernmost parts of the country are almost tropical, while the northernmost part is subarctic.

=== Territory and boundary disputes ===
==== Southern border ====
Eastward from Bhutan and north of the Brahmaputra River (Yarlung Zangbo Jiang) lies a large area controlled and administered by India but claimed by the Chinese. The area was demarcated by the British McMahon Line, drawn along the Himalayas in 1914 as the Sino-Indian border; India accepts and China rejects this boundary. In June 1980 China made its first move in twenty years to settle the border disputes with India, proposing that India cede the Aksai Chin area in Jammu and Kashmir to China in return for China's recognition of the McMahon Line; India did not accept the offer, however, preferring a sector-by-sector approach to the problem. In July 1986 China and India held their seventh round of border talks, but they made little headway toward resolving the dispute. Each side, but primarily India, continued to make allegations of incursions into its territory by the other. Most of the mountainous and militarized boundary with India is still in dispute, but Beijing and New Delhi have committed to begin resolution with discussions on the least disputed middle sector. India does not recognize Pakistan's ceding lands to China in a 1964 boundary agreement.

India: On 15 May 2015, Mr. Li from China and Mr. Modi from India held talks at the Great Hall of the people during Modi's China tour. The two leaders held talks on border disputes that began in 1914 when the British still controlled India and signed an agreement with Tibet to make the McMahon line the de facto boundary between India and China, even though China had rejected this agreement. Both countries had various claims to disputed territories such as the South Tibetan region of Zangnan which is considered to be part of the Arunachal Pradesh state in India. So far there have been only talks and no solutions and tensions continue to rise as each country continues to increase regional influences.

==== Seas ====
China is involved in a complex dispute with Malaysia, Philippines, Vietnam, and possibly Brunei over the Spratly (Nansha) Islands in the South China Sea. The 2002 "Declaration on the Conduct of Parties in the South China Sea" eased tensions but fell short of a legally binding code of conduct desired by several of the disputants. China also controls the Paracel (Xisha) Islands, which are also claimed by Vietnam, and asserts a claim to the Japanese-administered Senkaku (Diaoyu) Islands in the East China Sea.

South China Sea: On 16 June 2011, the Chinese government sent out one of its largest patrol ships known as the Haixun-31 which the Chinese government describe as routine. The ship will pass the Paracel and Spratly Islands and make its way up from the Malaysian to Filipino coast. Vietnam, China, the Philippines, Taiwan, Brunei and Malaysia all have competing claims to the Spratlys Islands while Beijing and Hanoi are in dispute over the Paracel islands. Hanoi has proposed a multilateral solution between the Asian countries but China says that it prefers to negotiate with individual states separately.

==== Border security ====
China signed the Sino-Soviet Treaty of Friendship and Alliance with the Soviet Union in 1950. In the wake of the Sino-Soviet split during the 1960s, the Sino-Soviet border became highly militarized: at one point over 1.5 million nuclear-armed troops were installed along both sides of the border. Relations improved in the mid-1980s due to the decrease in threat to the Chinese government from the USSR. On 13 January 2011, the parliament of Tajikistan voted to ratify a 1999 deal to cede 1,000 km^{2} (390 sq mi) of land in the remote Pamir Mountain range, which thoroughly resolved a century-long border dispute with China. China is the largest investor in the Tajik economy especially in the energy and infrastructure sectors.

== Climate and environment ==
=== Climate ===
Köppen climate types of China

Owing to tremendous differences in latitude, longitude, and altitude, the climate of China is extremely diverse, ranging from tropical in the far south to subarctic in the far north and alpine in the higher elevations of the Tibetan Plateau. Monsoon winds, caused by differences in the heat-absorbing capacity of the continent and the ocean, dominate the climate. During the summer, the East Asian monsoon carries warm and moist air from the south and delivers the vast majority of the annual precipitation in much of the country. Conversely, the Siberian anticyclone dominates during winter, bringing cold and comparatively dry conditions. The advance and retreat of the monsoons account in large degree for the timing of the rainy season throughout the country. Although most of the country lies in the temperate belt, its climatic patterns are complex.

The northern extremities of both Heilongjiang and Inner Mongolia have a subarctic climate; in contrast, most of Hainan Island and parts of the extreme southern fringes of Yunnan have a tropical climate. Temperature differences in winter are considerable, but in summer the variance is considerably less. For example, Mohe County, Heilongjiang has a 24-hour average temperature in January approaching −30 °C (−22 °F), while the corresponding figure in July exceeds 18 °C (64 °F). By contrast, most of Hainan has a January mean in excess of 17 °C (63 °F), while the July mean there is generally above 28 °C (82 °F).

Precipitation is almost invariably concentrated in the warmer months, though annual totals range from less than 20 millimetres (0.8 in) in northwestern Qinghai and the Turpan Depression of Xinjiang to easily exceeding 2,000 millimetres (79 in) in Guangdong, Guangxi, and Hainan. The conspicuous seasonal variation in precipitation that defines Chinese (and, to a large extent, East Asian) climate is absent only in some pockets of the Dzungaria region of Xinjiang. Much of the country is vulnerable to flooding when extreme rain happens around waterways with large population centers; flooding is one of the most expensive disasters for the country, and will occur more frequently with climate change.

Annual sunshine duration ranges from less than 1,100 hours in parts of Sichuan and Chongqing to over 3,400 hours in northwestern Qinghai. Seasonal patterns in sunshine vary considerably by region, but overall, the north and the Tibetan Plateau are sunnier than the south of the country.

Climate of China

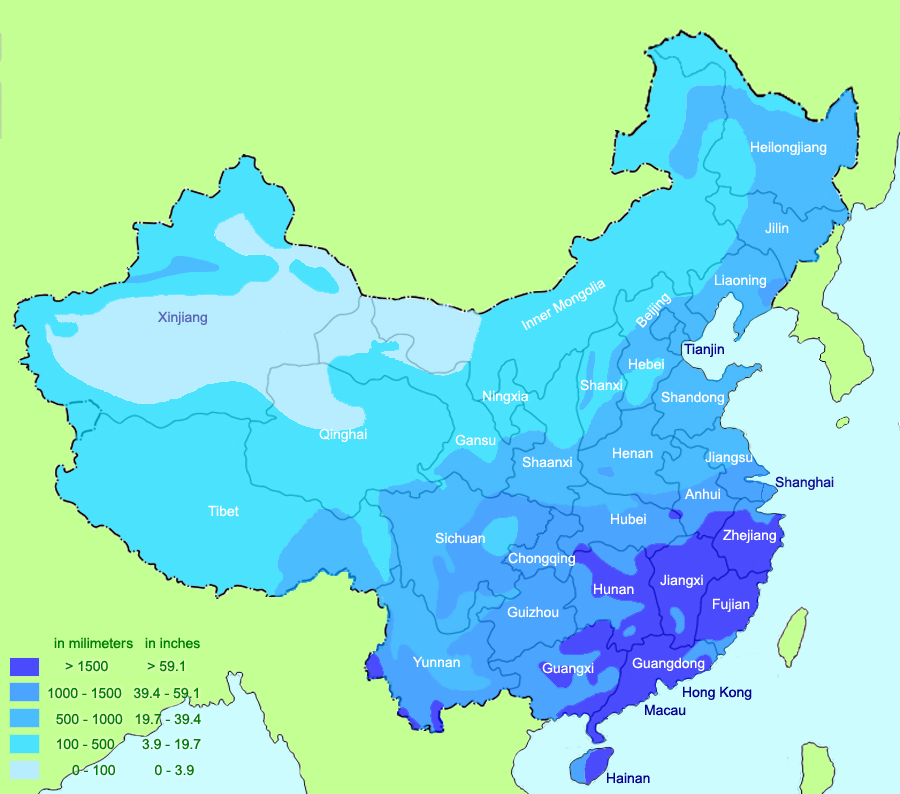
The average annual precipitation in China

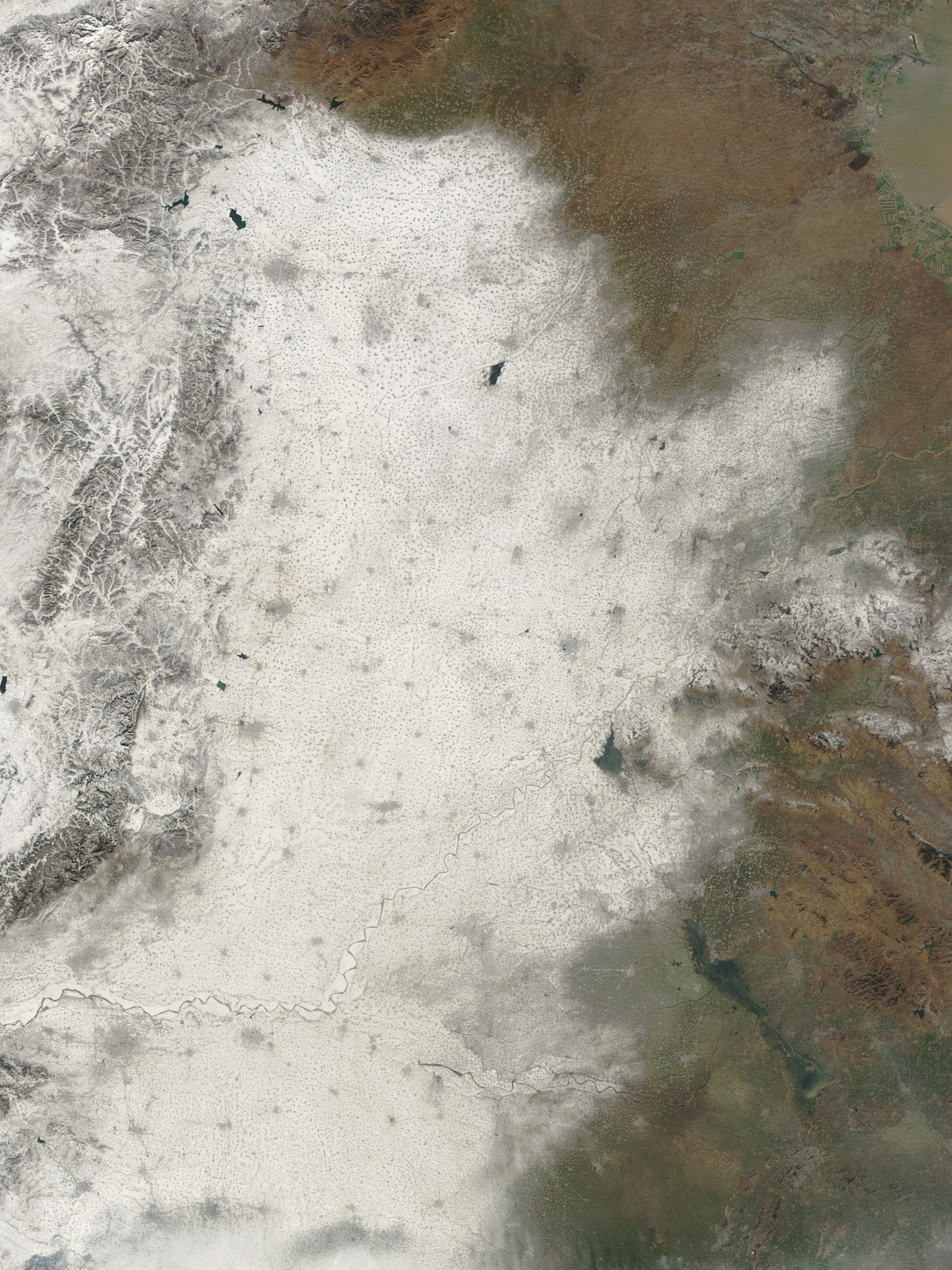
Early-season snow covering part of the North China Plain near Shijiazhuang, Hebei

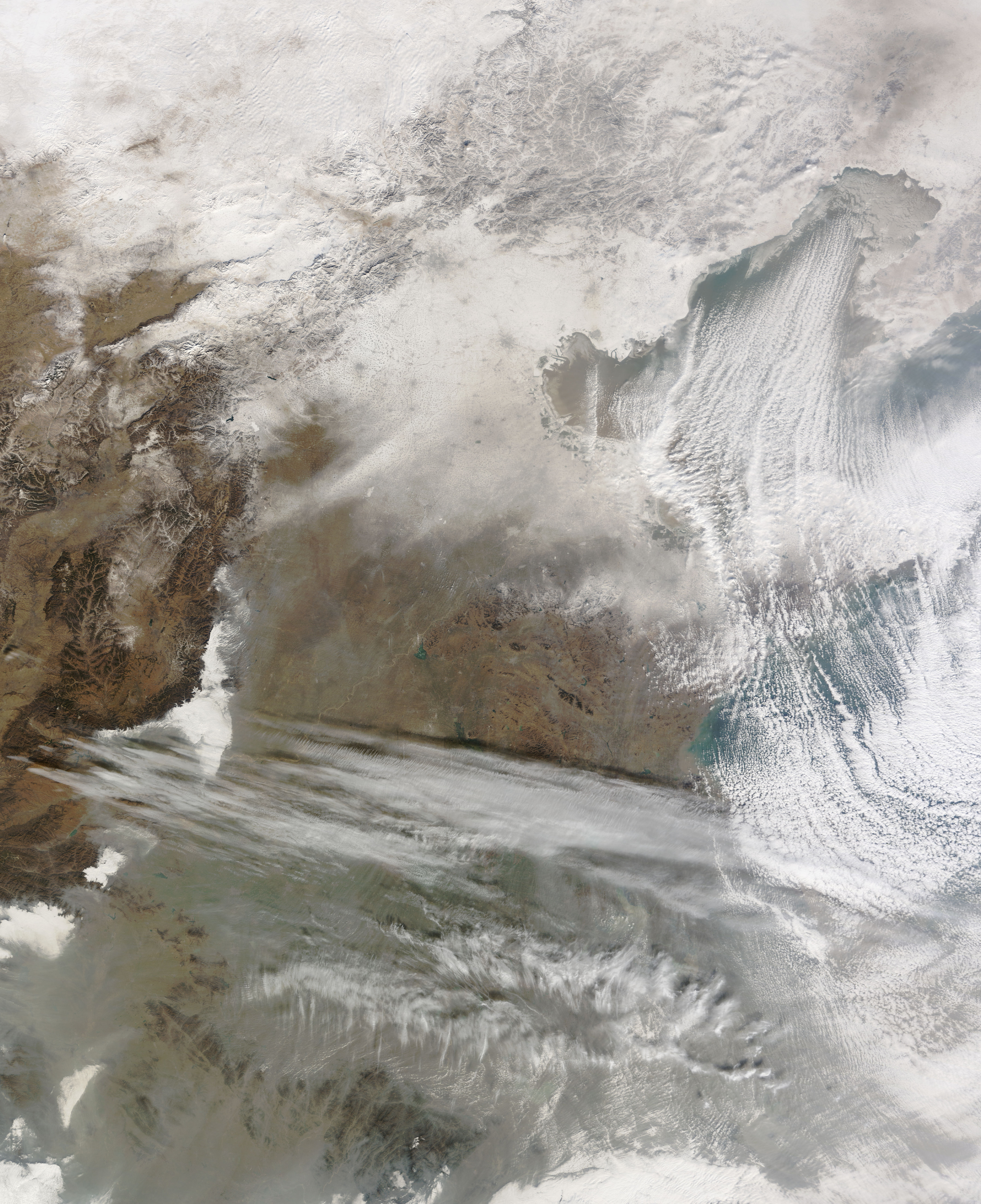
Snow encircling the area around the Bo Hai

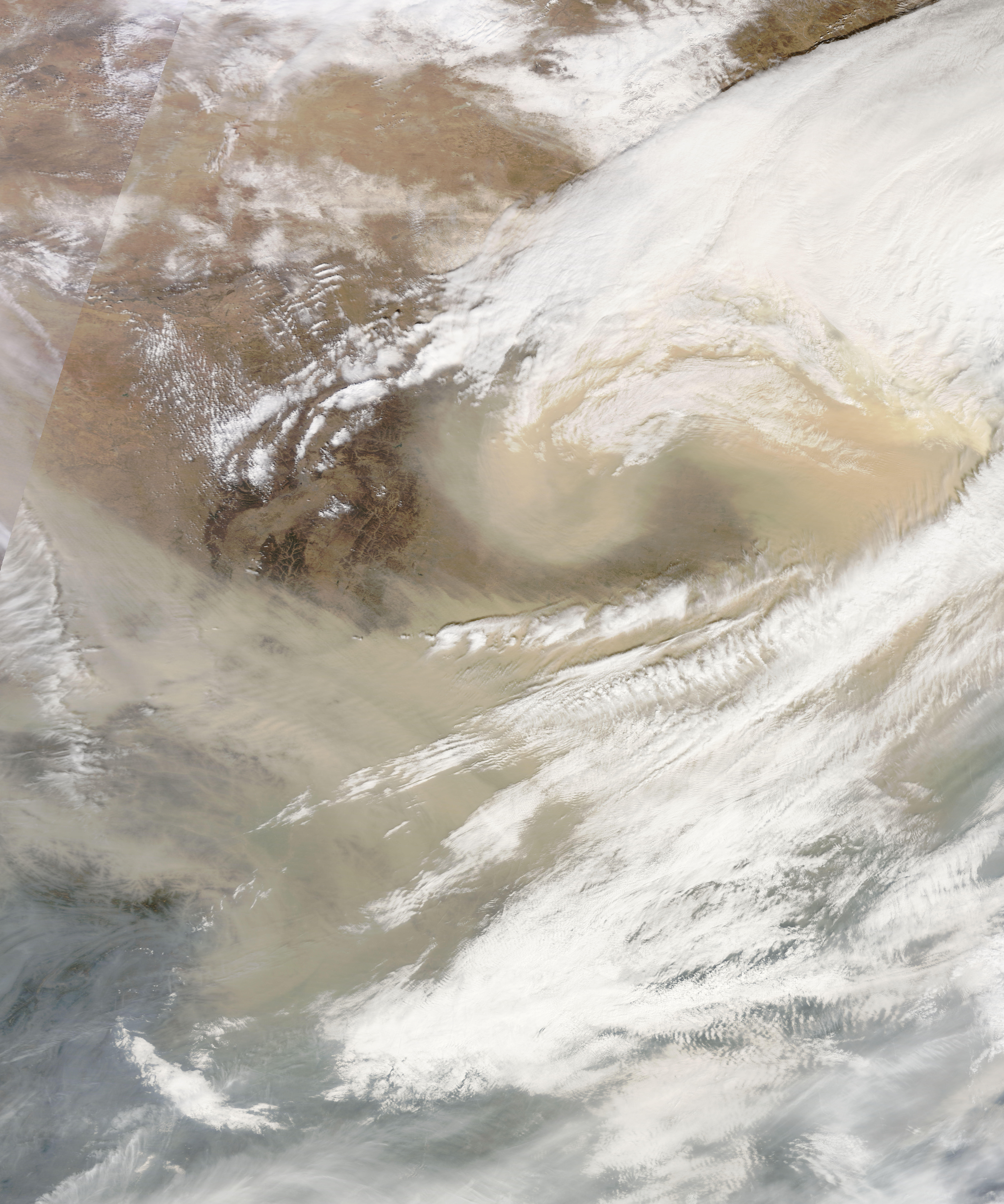
The first day of spring 2010 brought a massive sandstorm blowing from Inner Mongolia

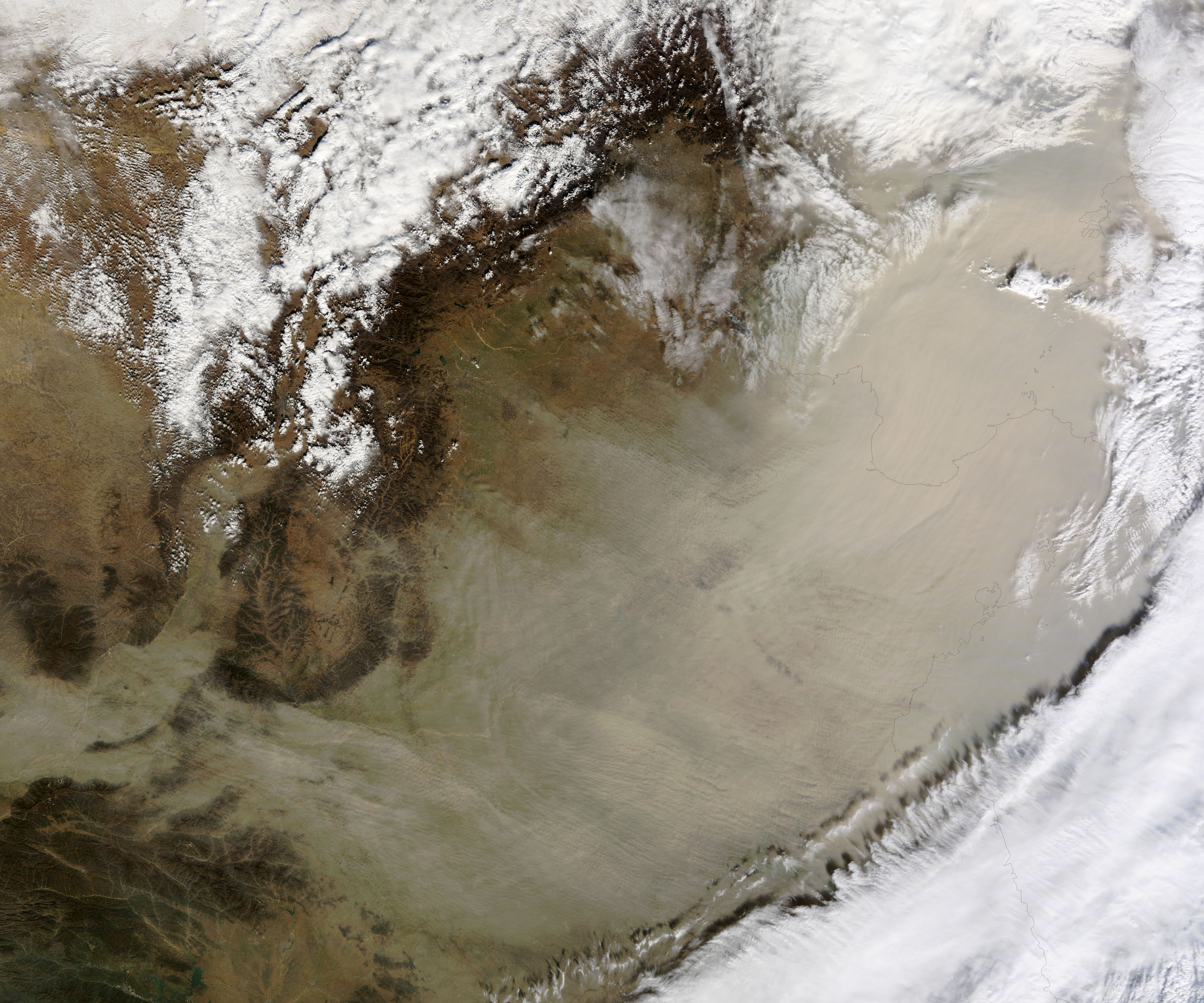
On November 11, 2010, a wall of sand blew across northern China, covering much of the North China Plain and Shandong Peninsula.

=== Environment ===
Air pollution (sulfur dioxide particulates) from reliance on coal is a major issue, along with water pollution from untreated wastes and use of debated standards of pollutant concentration rather than total maximum daily load. There are water shortages, particularly in the north. The eastern part of China often experiences smoke and dense fog in the atmosphere as a result of industrial pollution. Heavy deforestation with an estimated loss of one-fifth of agricultural land since 1949 to soil erosion and economic development is occurring with resulting desertification.

China is a party to the Antarctic-Environmental Protocol, the Antarctic Treaty, the Convention on Biological Diversity, the Climate Change treaty, the United Nations Convention to Combat Desertification, the Endangered Species treaty, the Hazardous Wastes treaty, the Law of the Sea, the International Tropical Timber Agreements of 1983 and 1994, the International Convention for the Regulation of Whaling, and agreements on Marine Dumping, Ozone Layer Protection, Ship Pollution, and Wetlands protection. China has signed, but not ratified, the Kyoto Protocol (but is not yet required to reduce its carbon emission under the agreement, as is India) and the Nuclear Test Ban treaty.

Air pollution in China

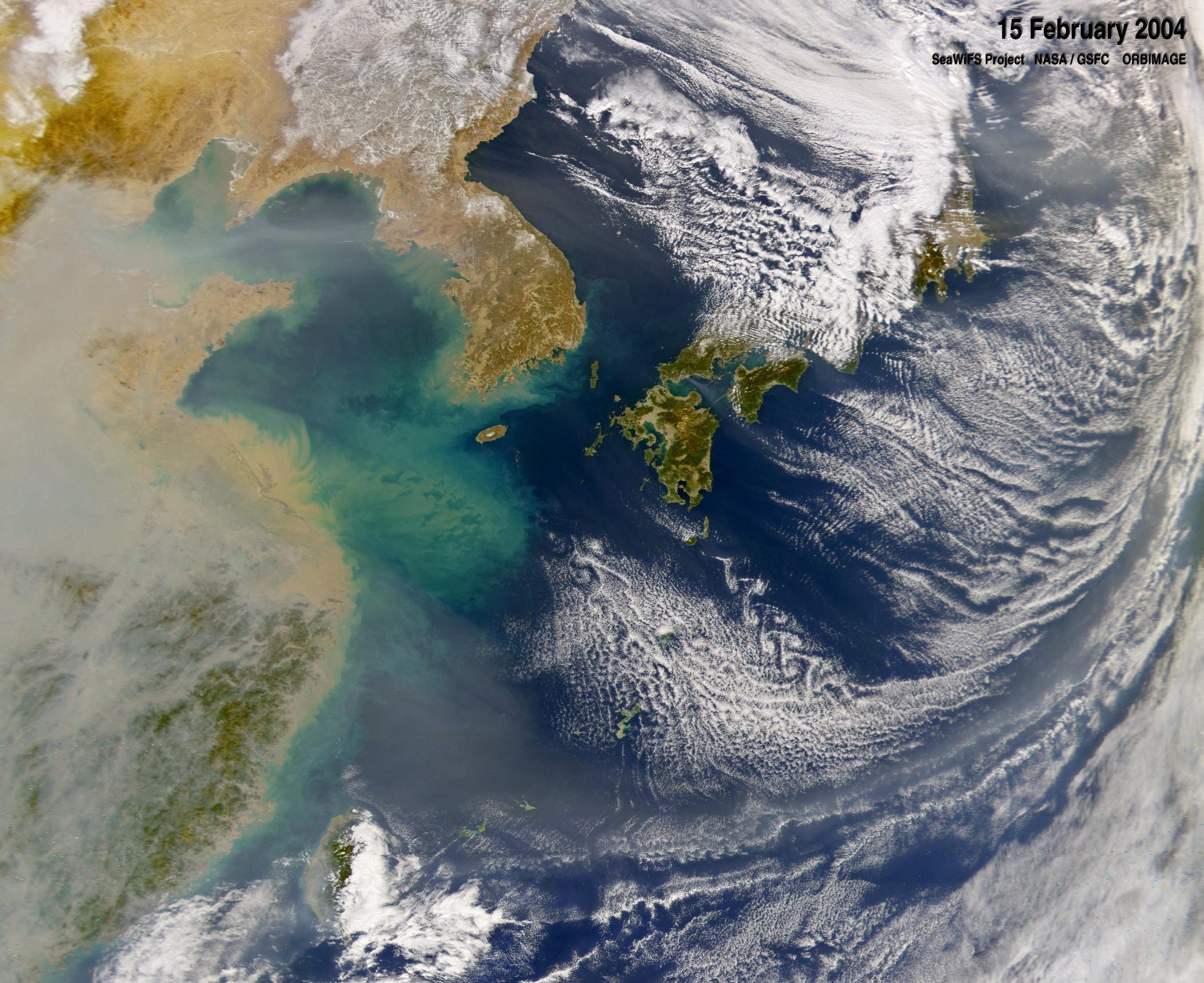
Smog from Eastern China spread over neighboring areas in February 2004.

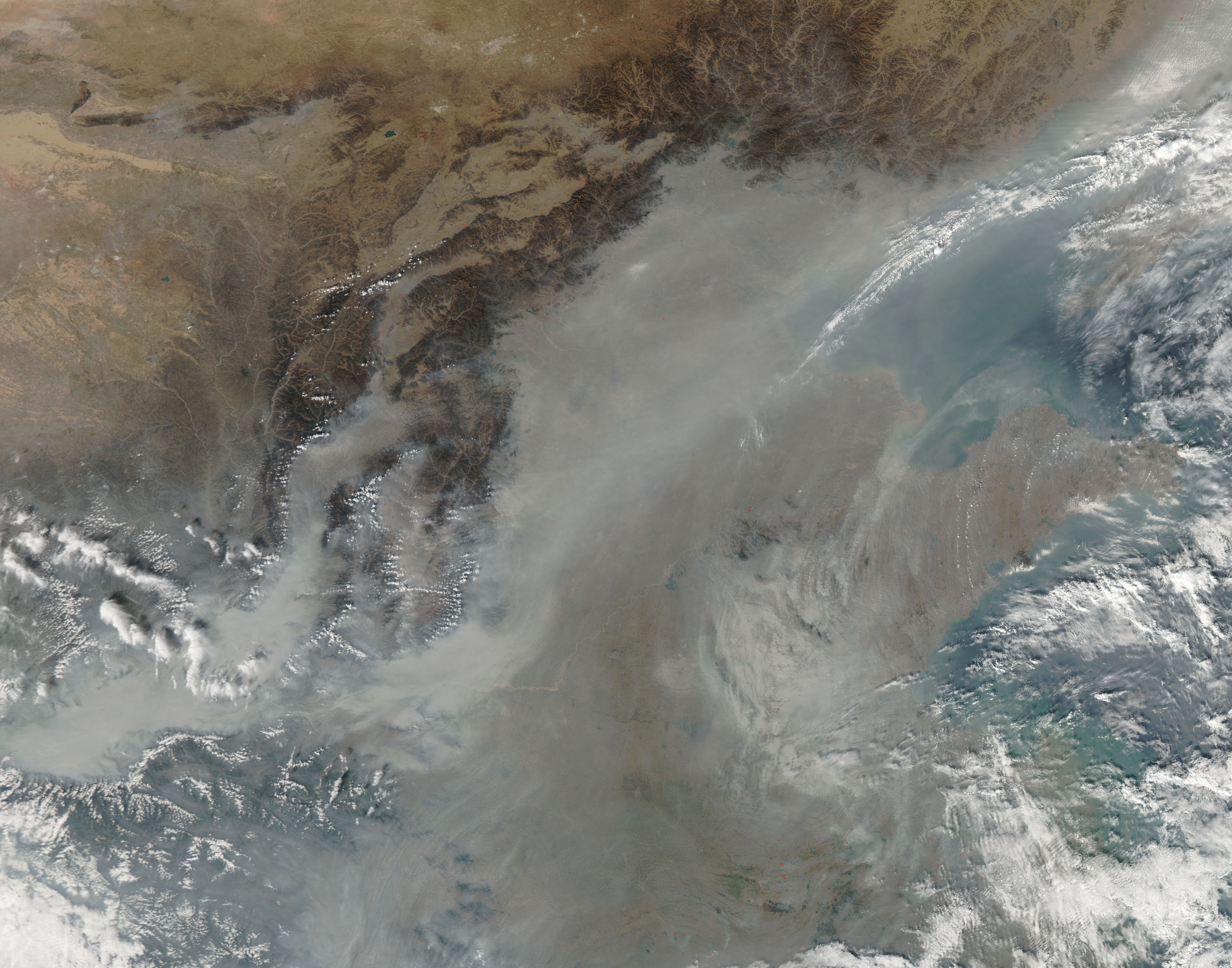
Haze over the North China Plain and the Lüliang Mountains of Shanxi

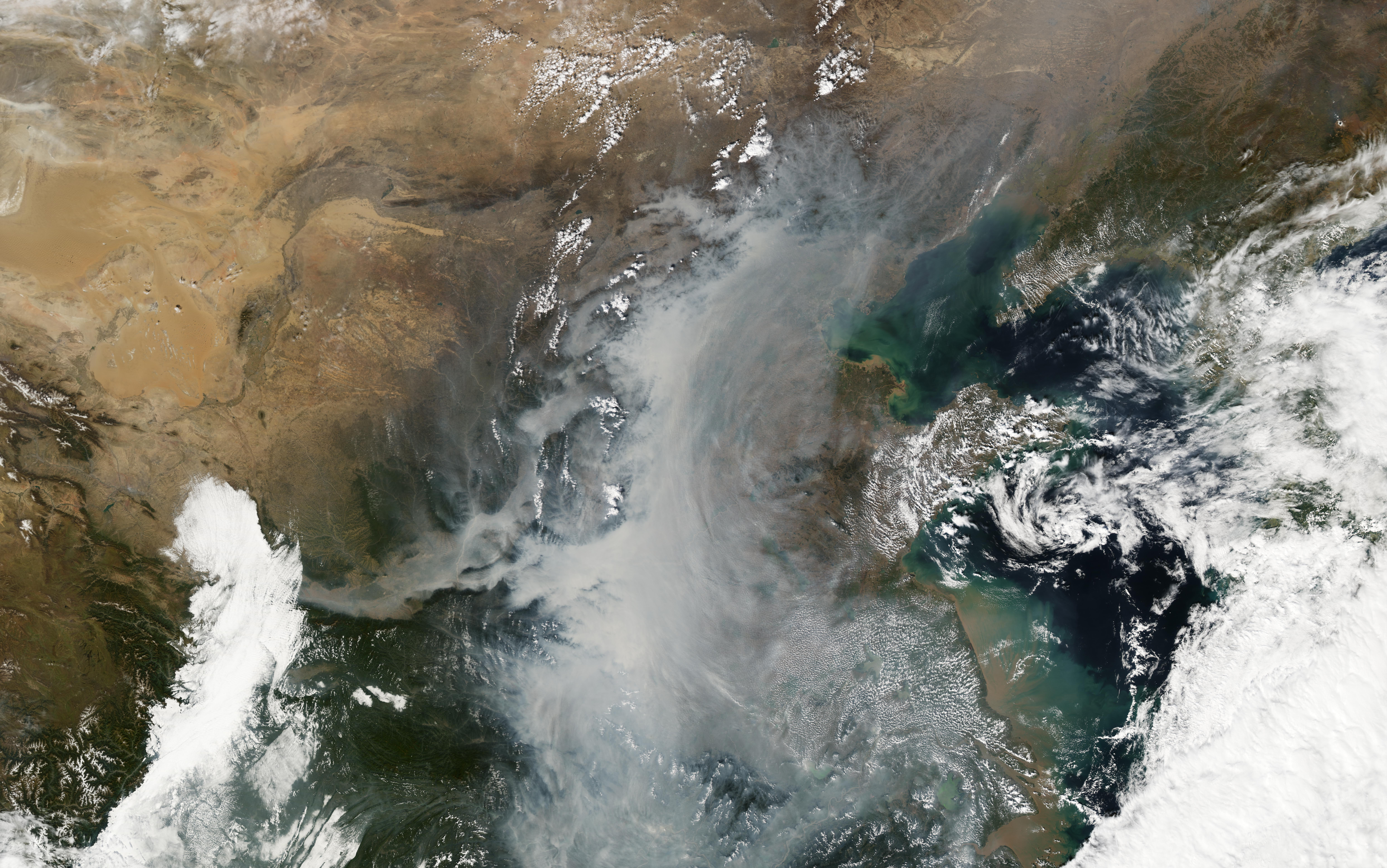
Natural color satellite image of a smog event in the heart of northern China

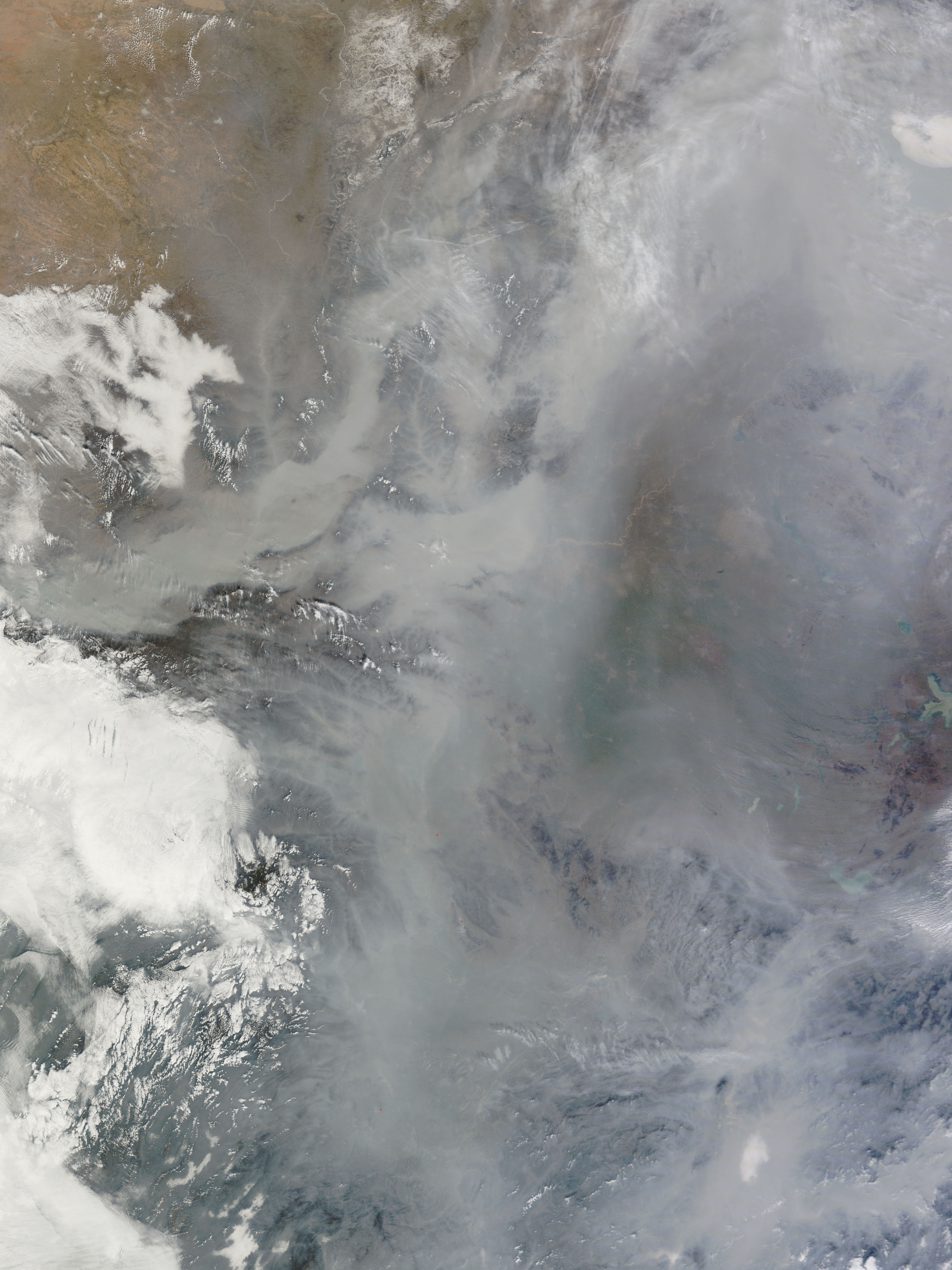
Dense smog settled over the North China Plain on February 20, 2011.

== See also ==
- History of human geography in China
- Environment of China
- List of islands of China
- List of rivers in China
- List of mountains in China
- Lakes in China
- North China Plain
- Geography of Hong Kong
- Geography of Macau
- Geographic information systems in China
- Zomia (geography)
- Neolithic in China

== Notes and references ==
- Fitzpatrick, John. 1992. "The Middle Kingdom, the Middle Sea, and the Geographical Pivot of History". Review (fernand Braudel Center) 15 (3). Research Foundation of SUNY: 477–521. https://www.jstor.org/stable/40241233.
