= History of human geography in China =

The idea of human geography originated rather early in China, about 2,000 years ago. The classical works of philosophy and history contained much of the concept of the relationship between human activities and "Tian" (the heaven) or "Di" (the earth), recognizing that both sides were now and then in harmonious state or in contradictory condition, and both sides had their own evolutionary laws.

== See also ==
- Geography of China
- Chinese historiography
- China Historical Geographic Information System
