= Outline of geography =

Hierarchical outline list of articles related to geography

A map of the world

The following outline is provided as an overview of and topical guide to geography:

Geography is the study of space, spatial relationships, and the interaction between nature and humans.

== Nature of geography ==
=== Geography as ===
- an academic discipline – a body of knowledge given to − or received by − a disciple (student); a branch or sphere of knowledge, or field of study, that an individual has chosen to specialize in. Modern geography is an all-encompassing discipline that seeks to understand the Earth and its human and natural complexities − not merely where objects are, but how they have changed and come to be. Geography has been called 'the world discipline'.
- a field of science – widely recognized category of specialized expertise within science, and typically embodies its own terminology and nomenclature. This field will usually be represented by one or more scientific journals, where peer-reviewed research is published. There are many geography-related scientific journals.
  - a natural science – field of academic scholarship that explores aspects of the natural environment (physical geography).
  - a social science – field of academic scholarship that explores aspects of human society (human geography).
  - A field of applied science – a discipline that utilizes geographic concepts, spatial analysis, and technological tools (such as GIS, Geomatics, Geodesy,and Geodesign) to solve practical real-world problems in urban planning, environmental management, and decision-making (Applied Geography and Technical Geography).
- an interdisciplinary field – a field that crosses traditional boundaries between academic disciplines or schools of thought, as new needs and professions have emerged. Many of the branches of physical geography are also branches of Earth science.

== Branches of geography ==
As "the bridge between the human and physical and applied sciences", geography is divided into three main branches:

- human geography
- physical geography
- technical geography

Other branches include:

- integrated geography
- regional geography
- legal geography.

=== Physical geography ===
- Physical geography – examines the natural environment and how the climate, vegetation and life, soil, water, and landforms are produced and interact.

==== Fields of physical geography ====
- Geomorphology – study of landforms and the processes that form them, and more broadly, of the processes controlling the topography of any planet. It seeks to understand why landscapes look the way they do, to understand landform history and dynamics, and to predict future changes through field observation, physical experiments, and numerical modeling.
- Hydrology – study water movement, distribution, and quality throughout the Earth, including the hydrologic cycle, water resources, and environmental watershed sustainability.
- Glaciology – study of glaciers, or more generally ice and natural phenomena that involve ice.
- Oceanography – studies a wide range of topics about oceans, including marine organisms and ecosystem dynamics; ocean currents, waves, and geophysical fluid dynamics; plate tectonics and the geology of the sea floor; and fluxes of various chemical substances and physical properties within the ocean and across its boundaries.
- Biogeography – study of species distribution spatially and temporally. Over areal ecological changes, it is also tied to the concepts of species and their past, or present living 'refugium', their survival locales, or their interim living sites. It aims to reveal where organisms live and at what abundance.
- Climatology – study of climate, scientifically defined as weather conditions averaged over a period of time.
- Meteorology is the interdisciplinary scientific study of the atmosphere that focuses on weather processes and short-term forecasting (in contrast with climatology).
- Pedology – study of soils in their natural environment that deals with pedogenesis, soil morphology, and soil classification.
- Palaeogeography – study of what geography was in times past, most often concerning the physical landscape and the human or cultural environment.
- Coastal geography – study of the dynamic interface between the ocean and the land, incorporating both the physical geography (i.e., coastal geomorphology, geology, and oceanography) and the human geography (sociology and history) of the coast. It involves understanding coastal weathering processes, particularly wave action, sediment movement, and weather, as well as how humans interact with the coast.
- Quaternary science – focuses on the Quaternary period, which encompasses the last 2.6 million years, including the last ice age and the Holocene period.
- Landscape ecology – the relationship between spatial patterns of urban development and ecological processes on many landscape scales and organizational levels.

==== Approaches of physical geography ====
- Quantitative research tools and methods applied to geography. See also the quantitative revolution.
- Systems approach

=== Human geography ===
- Human geography – one of the two main subfields of geography is the study of human use and understanding of the world and the processes that have affected it. Human geography broadly differs from physical geography in that it focuses on the built environment and how space is created, viewed, and managed by humans, as well as the influence humans have on the space they occupy.

==== Fields of human geography ====
- Cultural geography – study of cultural products and norms and their variations across and relations to spaces and places. It focuses on describing and analyzing the ways language, religion, economy, government, and other cultural phenomena vary or remain constant from one place to another and on explaining how humans function spatially.
  - Children's geographies – study of places and spaces of children's lives, characterized experientially, politically and ethically. Children's geographies rest on the idea that children as a social group share certain characteristics that are experientially, politically, and ethically significant and worthy of study. The pluralization in the title is intended to imply that children's lives will be markedly different in differing times and places and in differing circumstances such as gender, family, and class. The range of foci within children's geographies includes:
    - Children and the city
    - Children and the countryside
    - Children and technology
    - Children and nature,
    - Children and globalization
    - Methodologies of researching children's worlds
    - Ethics of researching children's worlds
    - Otherness of childhood
  - Animal geographies – studies the spaces and places occupied by animals in human culture because social life and space are heavily populated by animals of many different kinds and in many differing ways (e.g., farm animals, pets, wild animals in the city). Another impetus that has influenced the development of the field is ecofeminist and other environmentalist viewpoints on nature-society relations (including questions of animal welfare and rights).
  - Geography of food – study of the spatial patterns of food production, distribution, and consumption from local to global scales, and the spatial inequalities within food systems.
  - Media geography is an interdisciplinary subfield of human geography that studies the intersection of media and geography and the spatial dimensions of communication, including how media systems and communicative practices shape places, territories, and spatial relations.
  - Language geography – studies the geographic distribution of language or its constituent elements. There are two principal fields of study within the geography of language:
    1. Geography of languages – deals with the distribution through history and space of languages,
    2. Linguistic geography – deals with regional linguistic variations within languages.
  - Sexuality and space – encompasses all relationships and interactions between human sexuality, space, and place, including the geographies of LGBT residence, public sex environments, sites of queer resistance, global sexualities, sex tourism, the geographies of prostitution and adult entertainment, use of sexualised locations in the arts, and sexual citizenship.
  - Religion geography – study of the influence of geography, i.e., place and space, on religious belief.
- Development geography – study of the Earth's geography concerning its inhabitants' standard of living and quality of life. Measures development by looking at economic, political, and social factors and seeks to understand both the geographical causes and consequences of varying development, in part by comparing More Economically Developed Countries (MEDCs) with Less Economically Developed Countries (LEDCs).
- Economic geography – study of the location, distribution, and spatial organization of economic activities worldwide. Subjects of interest include but are not limited to the location of industries, economies of agglomeration (also known as "linkages"), transportation, international trade and development, real estate, gentrification, ethnic economies, gendered economies, core-periphery theory, the economics of urban form, the relationship between the environment and the economy (tying into a long history of geographers studying culture-environment interaction), and globalization.
  - Marketing geography – a discipline within marketing analysis that uses geolocation (geographic information) in the process of planning and implementation of marketing activities. It can be used in any aspect of the marketing mix – the product, price, promotion, or place (geo-targeting).
  - Transportation geography – branch of economic geography that investigates spatial interactions between people, freight, and information. It studies humans and their use of vehicles or other modes of traveling and how flows of finished goods and raw materials service markets.
- Health geography – application of geographical information, perspectives, and methods to the study of health, disease, and health care, to provide a spatial understanding of a population's health, the distribution of disease in an area, and the environment's effect on health and disease. It also deals with accessibility to health care and spatial distribution of health care providers.
  - Time geography – study of the temporal factor on spatial human activities within the following constraints:
1. Authority - limits of accessibility to certain places or domains placed on individuals by owners or authorities
2. Capability - limitations on the movement of individuals based on their nature. For example, movement is restricted by biological factors, such as the need for food, drink, and sleep
3. Coupling - restraint of an individual, anchoring him or her to a location while interacting with other individuals to complete a task
- Historical geography – the study of the human, physical, fictional, theoretical, and "real" geographies of the past. It seeks to determine how cultural features of various societies across the planet emerged and evolved by understanding how a place or region changes through time, including how people have interacted with their environment and created the cultural landscape.
- Political geography – study of the spatially uneven outcomes of political processes and how political processes are themselves affected by spatial structures. The inter-relationships between people, state, and territory.
  - Electoral geography – study of the relationship between election results and the regions they affect (such as the environmental impact of voting decisions), and of the effects of regional factors upon voting behavior.
  - Geopolitics – analysis of geography, history, and social science concerning spatial politics and patterns at various scales, ranging from the level of the state to international.
  - Strategic geography – concerned with the control of, or access to, spatial areas that affect the security and prosperity of nations.
  - Military geography – applying geographic tools, spatial intelligence, and techniques to military strategy, national security, and defense; focusing on how spatial understanding of living spaces is leveraged to gain strategic advantages and protect national borders.
- Population geography – study of how spatial variations in the distribution, composition, migration, and growth of populations are related to the nature of places.
- Tourism geography – study of travel and tourism, as an industry and as a social and cultural activity, and their effect on places, including the environmental impact of tourism, the geographies of tourism and leisure economies, answering tourism industry and management concerns and the sociology of tourism and locations of tourism.
- Urban geography – the study of urban areas, in terms of concentration, infrastructure, economy, and environmental impacts.
- Internet geography –also called cyber geography, is a subfield of geography that studies how the internet is organized from social, economic, cultural, and technological perspectives. The Oxford Internet Institute mapped the geographic distribution of Internet users, demonstrating the differences in internet use across varying countries and regions.

==== applications of human geography ====
- Spatial planning – integration of human geography and applied geography,serving as a direct application of human geography that is frequently combined with geodesign.
- Public participation GIS – practice at the intersection of human geography and geographic information science,Using GIS (geographic information science) to invovle local communities and non-experts in spatial planning and decision-making processes.

==== Approaches of human geography ====
- Behavioral geography – Approach to human geography that examines human behavior using a disaggregate approach
- Cognitive geography – Interdisciplinary study of cognitive science and geography
- Critical geography – Variant of social science that seeks to interpret and change the world
- Feminist geography – Sub-discipline in human geography
- Marxist geography – Strand of critical geography
- Non-representational theory – Post-structuralist human geography theory
- Postcolonialism – Study of the cultural legacy of colonialism and imperialism
- Post-structuralism – Philosophical school and tradition –
- Qualitative research tools and methods applied to geography.

=== Integrated geography ===
- Integrated geography – branch of geography that describes the spatial aspects of interactions between human geography and the physical geography. It combines physical sciences (such as geology, meteorology, geochemistry, biogeography, ecology, and geophysics) with the socio-economic ways human societies perceive, manage, and transform the environment.

=== Technical geography ===
- Technical geography – branch of geography and the discipline of studying, developing, and applying methods to gather, store, process, and deliver geographic or spatially referenced information. It is a widespread interdisciplinary field that includes the tools and techniques used in land surveying, remote sensing, cartography, Geographic Information Systems (GIS), Global Navigation Satellite Systems, photogrammetry, and related forms of earth mapping,while academically recognized as Technical Geography,its practical and commercial applications are widely referred to as the "Geospatial" sector or industry in the job market.

==== Approaches of technical geography ====
- Geomatics – Geographic data discipline
- Geoinformatics – Application of information science methods in geography and geosciences
- Geodesy – Science of measuring the shape, orientation, and gravity of Earth
- Geodesign – Set of geospatial design concepts and methods
- Geographic information science – Scientific discipline
- Quantitative geography – Subfield of geographic methods
- Qualitative geography – Subfield of geographic methods
- Spatial analysis – Techniques to study geometric data

==== methods and techniques ====
- Geospatial – Data and information having an implicit or explicit association with a location
- Global navigation satellite systems represented by Satellite navigation – Use of satellite signals for navigation or geo-spatial positioning – Any system that uses satellite radio signals to provide autonomous geo-spatial positioning
  - Global Positioning System – American satellite-based radio navigation service
- Geographic information system – System to capture, manage, and present geographic data
- Geostatistics – Branch of statistics focusing on spatial data sets
- Geovisualization – Visualization of geospatial data
- Navigation – Process of monitoring and controlling the movement of a craft or vehicle
- Remote sensing – Obtaining information through non-contact sensors
- Photogrammetry – Taking measurements using photography
- Digital terrain modelling – 3D computer-generated imagery and measurements of terrain
- Digital twin – Digital replica of a living or non-living physical entity
- Surveying – Science of determining the positions of points and the distances and angles between them
- Cartography – Study and practice of making maps

=== Regional geography ===
Regional geography – study of world regions. Attention is paid to unique characteristics of a particular region such as its natural elements, human elements, and regionalization which covers the techniques of delineating space into regions. Regional geography breaks down into the study of specific regions.

Region – an area, defined by physical characteristics, human characteristics, or functional characteristics. The term is used in various ways among the different branches of geography. A region can be seen as a collection of smaller units, such as a country and its political divisions, or as one part of a larger whole, as in a country on a continent.

==== Continents ====
Continent – one of several large landmasses on Earth. They are generally identified by convention rather than any specific criteria, but seven areas are commonly regarded as continents. They are:

1. Africa (outline) –
2. Antarctica –
3. Australia (outline) –

The Americas:

4. North America (outline) –
5. South America (outline) –

Eurasia:

6. Europe (outline) –
7. Asia (outline) –

===== Subregions =====
Subregion (list)

==== Biogeographic regions ====
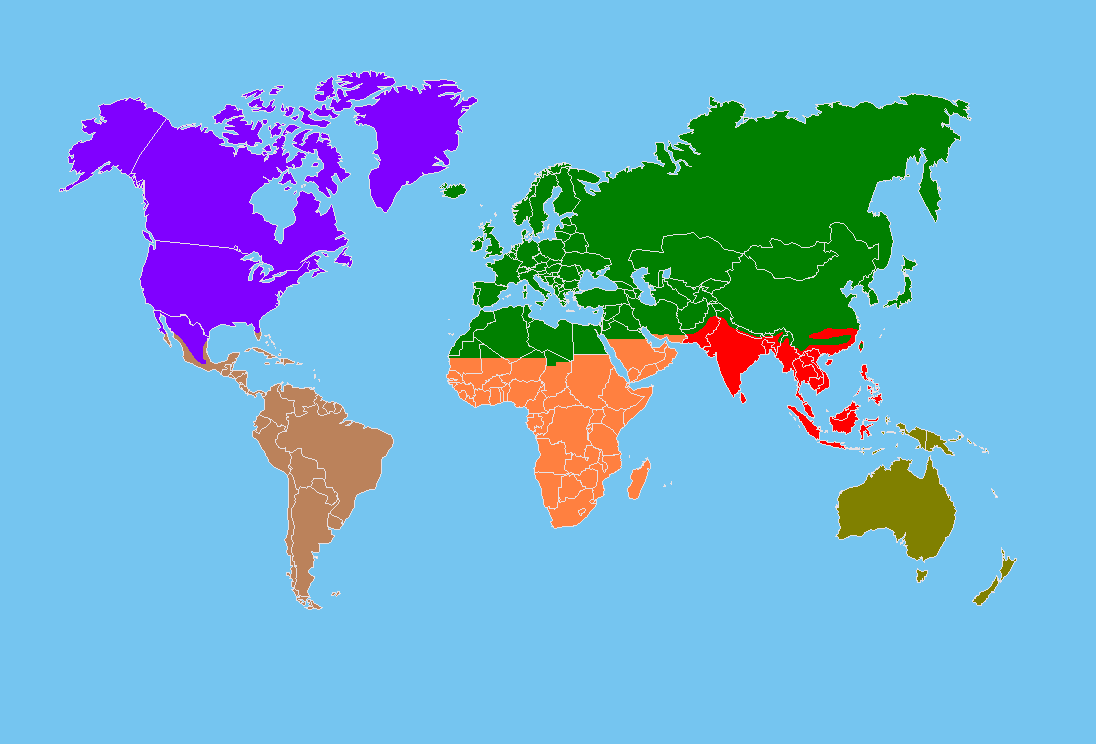
Map of six of the world's eight biogeographic realms Nearctic Palearctic Afrotropic Indomalaya Australasia Neotropic Oceania and Antarctic realms not shown

===== Biogeographic realm =====
The World Wildlife Fund (WWF) developed a system of eight biogeographic realms (ecozones):

- Nearctic 22.9 mil. km^{2} (including most of North America)
- Palearctic 54.1 mil. km^{2} (including the bulk of Eurasia and North Africa)
- Afrotropic 22.1 mil. km^{2} (including Sub-Saharan Africa)
- Indomalaya 7.5 mil. km^{2} (including the South Asian subcontinent and Southeast Asia)
- Australasia 7.7 mil. km^{2} (including Australia, New Guinea, and neighboring islands). The northern boundary of this zone is known as the Wallace line.
- Neotropic 19.0 mil. km^{2} (including South America and the Caribbean)
- Oceania 1.0 mil. km^{2} (including Polynesia, Fiji and Micronesia)
- Antarctic 0.3 mil. km^{2} (including Antarctica).

===== Ecoregions =====
Ecoregion Biogeographic realms are further divided into ecoregions. The World has over 800 terrestrial ecoregions. See Lists of ecoregions by country.

==== Geography of the political divisions of the World ====
- Geography of Africa (Outline)
  - West Africa#Geography and climate
    - Geography of Benin (Outline)
    - Geography of Burkina Faso (Outline)
    - Geography of Cape Verde (Outline)
    - Geography of Côte d'Ivoire (Outline)
    - Geography of Gambia (Outline)
    - Geography of Ghana (Outline)
    - Geography of Guinea (Outline)
    - Geography of Guinea-Bissau (Outline)
    - Geography of Liberia (Outline)
    - Geography of Mali (Outline)
    - Geography of Mauritania (Outline)
    - Geography of Niger (Outline)
    - Geography of Nigeria (Outline)
    - Geography of Senegal (Outline)
    - Geography of Sierra Leone (Outline)
    - Geography of Togo (Outline)
  - North Africa#Geography
    - Geography of Algeria (Outline)
    - Geography of Egypt (Outline)
    - Geography of Libya (Outline)
    - Geography of Mauritania (Outline)
    - Geography of Morocco (Outline)
    - Geography of Sudan (Outline)
    - Geography of Tunisia (Outline)
    - Geography of Western Sahara (Outline)
  - Central Africa
    - Geography of Angola (Outline)
    - Geography of Burundi (Outline)
    - Geography of Cameroon (Outline)
    - Geography of Central African Republic (Outline)
    - Geography of Chad (Outline)
    - Geography of Democratic Republic of the Congo (Outline)
    - Geography of Equatorial Guinea (Outline)
    - Geography of Gabon (Outline)
    - Geography of Republic of the Congo (Outline)
    - Geography of Rwanda (Outline)
    - Geography of São Tomé and Príncipe (Outline)
  - East Africa#Geography and climate
    - Geography of Burundi (Outline)
    - Geography of Comoros (Outline)
    - Geography of Djibouti (Outline)
    - Geography of Eritrea (Outline)
    - Geography of Ethiopia (Outline)
    - Geography of Kenya (Outline)
    - Geography of Madagascar (Outline)
    - Geography of Malawi (Outline)
    - Geography of Mauritius (Outline)
    - Geography of Mozambique (Outline)
    - Geography of Rwanda (Outline)
    - Geography of Seychelles (Outline)
    - Geography of Somalia (Outline)
    - Geography of Tanzania (Outline)
    - Geography of Uganda (Outline)
  - Southern Africa#Geography
    - Geography of Botswana (Outline)
    - Geography of Lesotho (Outline)
    - Geography of Namibia (Outline)
    - Geography of South Africa (Outline)
    - Geography of Swaziland (Outline)
    - Geography of Zambia (Outline)
    - Geography of Zimbabwe (Outline)
  - Dependencies in Africa
    - Geography of British Indian Ocean Territory (Outline) (UK)
    - Geography of Mayotte (Outline) (France)
    - Geography of Réunion (Outline) (France)
    - Geography of Saint Helena (Outline) (UK)
    - Canary Islands#Geography (Outline) (Spain)
    - Geography of Ceuta (Outline) (Spain)
    - Geography of Madeira (Outline) (Portugal)
    - Geography of Melilla (Outline) (Spain)
    - Geography of Socotra (Outline) (Yemen)
    - Geography of Puntland (Outline)
    - Geography of Somaliland (Outline)
    - Sahrawi Arab Democratic Republic (Outline)
- Geography of Antarctica (Outline)
- Geography of Asia (Outline)
  - Central Asia#Geography
    - Geography of Kazakhstan (Outline)
    - Geography of Kyrgyzstan (Outline)
    - Geography of Tajikistan (Outline)
    - Geography of Turkmenistan (Outline)
    - Geography of Uzbekistan (Outline)
  - East Asia
    - Geography of China (Outline)
      - Geography of Tibet (Outline)
      - Geography of Hong Kong (Outline)
      - Geography of Macau (Outline)
    - Geography of Japan (Outline)
    - Geography of North Korea (Outline)
    - Geography of South Korea (Outline)
    - Geography of Mongolia (Outline)
    - Geography of Taiwan (Outline)
  - North Asia#Geography
    - Geography of Russia (Outline)
  - Southeast Asia#Geography
    - Geography of Brunei (Outline)
    - Burma (Myanmar) - Outline)
    - Geography of Cambodia (Outline)
    - East Timor (Timor-Leste) - Outline)
    - Geography of Indonesia (Outline)
    - Geography of Laos (Outline)
    - Geography of Malaysia (Outline)
    - Geography of the Philippines (Outline)
    - Geography of Singapore (Outline)
    - Geography of Thailand (Outline)
    - Geography of Vietnam (Outline)
  - South Asia#Geography
    - Geography of Afghanistan (Outline)
    - Geography of Bangladesh (Outline)
    - Geography of Bhutan (Outline)
    - Geography of India (Outline)
    - Geography of Maldives (Outline)
    - Geography of Nepal (Outline)
    - Geography of Pakistan (Outline)
    - Geography of Sri Lanka (Outline)
  - Western Asia#Geography
    - Armenia#Geography (Outline)
    - Geography of Azerbaijan (Outline)
    - Geography of Bahrain (Outline)
    - Geography of Cyprus (Outline), including:
      - Geography of Northern Cyprus (Outline) (disputed territory)
    - Georgia (Outline)
    - Geography of Iran (Outline)
    - Geography of Iraq (Outline)
    - Geography of Israel (Outline)
    - Geography of Jordan (Outline)
    - Geography of Kuwait (Outline)
    - Geography of Lebanon (Outline)
    - Geography of Oman (Outline)
    - Geography of the Palestinian territories (Outline)
    - Geography of Qatar (Outline)
    - Geography of Saudi Arabia (Outline)
    - Geography of Syria (Outline)
    - Geography of Turkey (Outline)
    - Geography of United Arab Emirates (Outline)
    - Geography of Yemen (Outline)
- Caucasus#Geography and ecology (a region considered to be in both Asia and Europe, or between them)
  - North Caucasus
    - Geography of Russia (Outline) (the following parts of Russia are in the North Caucasus: Chechnya, Ingushetia, Dagestan, Adyghea, Kabardino-Balkaria, Karachay–Cherkessia, North Ossetia, Krasnodar Krai, Stavropol Krai)
  - South Caucasus
    - Georgia (Outline), including:
      - Geography of Abkhazia (Outline) (disputed territory)
      - Geography of South Ossetia (Outline) (disputed territory)
    - Armenia#Geography (Outline)
    - Geography of Azerbaijan (Outline), including:
      - Geography of Nagorno-Karabakh (Outline) (disputed territory)
- Geography of Europe (Outline)
  - Geography of Akrotiri and Dhekelia (Outline)
  - Geography of Åland (Outline)
  - Geography of Albania (Outline)
  - Geography of Andorra (Outline)
  - Geography of Armenia (Outline)
  - Geography of Austria (Outline)
  - Geography of Azerbaijan (Outline)
  - Geography of Belarus (Outline)
  - Geography of Belgium (Outline)
  - Geography of Bosnia and Herzegovina (Outline)
  - Geography of Bulgaria (Outline)
  - Geography of Croatia (Outline)
  - Geography of Cyprus (Outline)
  - Geography of Czech Republic (Outline)
  - Geography of Denmark (Outline)
  - Geography of Estonia (Outline)
  - Faroe Islands#Geography (Outline)
  - Geography of Finland (Outline)
  - Geography of France (Outline)
  - Geography of Georgia (Outline)
  - Geography of Germany (Outline)
  - Geography of Gibraltar (Outline)
  - Geography of Greece (Outline)
  - Geography of Guernsey (Outline)
  - Geography of Hungary (Outline)
  - Geography of Iceland (Outline)
  - Republic of Ireland#Geography (Outline)
  - Geography of the Isle of Man (Outline)
  - Geography of Italy (Outline)
  - Geography of Jersey (Outline)
  - Geography of Kazakhstan (Outline)
  - Geography of Kosovo (Outline)
  - Geography of Latvia (Outline)
  - Geography of Liechtenstein (Outline)
  - Geography of Lithuania (Outline)
  - Geography of Luxembourg (Outline)
  - Geography of Malta (Outline)
  - Geography of Moldova (Outline), including:
    - Geography of Transnistria (Outline) (disputed territory)
  - Geography of Monaco (Outline)
  - Geography of Montenegro (Outline)
  - Geography of Netherlands (Outline)
  - Geography of North Macedonia (Outline)
  - Geography of Norway (Outline)
  - Geography of Poland (Outline)
  - Geography of Portugal (Outline)
  - Geography of Romania (Outline)
  - Geography of Russia (Outline)
  - Geography of San Marino (Outline)
  - Geography of Serbia (Outline)
  - Geography of Slovakia (Outline)
  - Geography of Slovenia (Outline)
  - Geography of Spain (Outline)
  - Geography of Svalbard (Outline)
  - Geography of Sweden (Outline)
  - Geography of Switzerland (Outline)
  - Geography of Turkey (Outline)
  - Geography of Ukraine (Outline)
  - Geography of United Kingdom (Outline)
    - Geography of England (Outline)
    - Geography of Northern Ireland (Outline)
    - Geography of Scotland (Outline)
    - Geography of Wales (Outline)
  - Geography of Vatican City (Outline)
- Geography of North America (Outline)
  - Geography of Canada (Outline)
    - By province
      - Geography of Alberta
      - Geography of British Columbia (Outline)
      - Geography of Manitoba
      - Geography of New Brunswick
      - Geography of Newfoundland and Labrador
      - Geography of Nova Scotia
      - Geography of Ontario
      - Geography of Prince Edward Island
      - Geography of Quebec (Outline)
      - Geography of Saskatchewan (Outline)
    - By territory
      - Geography of the Northwest Territories
      - Geography of Nunavut
      - Geography of Yukon
  - Geography of Greenland (Outline)
  - Geography of Mexico (Outline)
  - Geography of Saint Pierre and Miquelon (Outline)
  - Geography of United States (Outline)
    - Geography of Alabama (Outline)
    - Geography of Alaska (Outline)
    - Geography of Arizona (Outline)
    - Geography of Arkansas (Outline)
    - Geography of California (Outline)
    - Geography of Colorado (Outline)
    - Geography of Connecticut (Outline)
    - Geography of Delaware (Outline)
    - Geography of Florida (Outline)
    - Geography of Georgia (Outline)
    - Geography of Hawaii (Outline)
    - Geography of Idaho (Outline)
    - Geography of Illinois (Outline)
    - Geography of Indiana (Outline)
    - Geography of Iowa (Outline)
    - Geography of Montana (Outline)
    - Geography of Kansas (Outline)
    - Geography of Kentucky (Outline)
    - Geography of Louisiana (Outline)
    - Geography of Maine (Outline)
    - Geography of Maryland (Outline)
    - Geography of Massachusetts (Outline)
    - Geography of Michigan (Outline)
    - Geography of Minnesota (Outline)
    - Geography of Mississippi (Outline)
    - Geography of Missouri (Outline)
    - Geography of Nebraska (Outline)
    - Geography of Nevada (Outline)
    - Geography of New Hampshire (Outline)
    - Geography of New Jersey (Outline)
    - Geography of New Mexico (Outline)
    - Geography of New York (Outline)
    - Geography of North Carolina (Outline)
    - Geography of North Dakota (Outline)
    - Geography of Ohio (Outline)
    - Geography of Oklahoma (Outline)
    - Geography of Oregon (Outline)
    - Geography of Pennsylvania (Outline)
    - Geography of Rhode Island (Outline)
    - Geography of South Carolina (Outline)
    - Geography of South Dakota (Outline)
    - Geography of Tennessee (Outline)
    - Geography of Texas (Outline)
    - Geography of Utah (Outline)
    - Geography of Vermont (Outline)
    - Geography of Virginia (Outline)
    - Geography of Washington (state) (Outline)
    - Geography of West Virginia (Outline)
    - Geography of Wisconsin (Outline)
    - Geography of Wyoming (Outline)
    - Geography of Washington, D.C. (Outline) (Washington, D.C.)
  - Central America#Geography (Outline)
    - Geography of Belize (Outline)
    - Geography of Costa Rica (Outline)
    - Geography of El Salvador (Outline)
    - Geography of Guatemala (Outline)
    - Geography of Honduras (Outline)
    - Geography of Nicaragua (Outline)
    - Geography of Panama (Outline)
  - Geography of the Caribbean (Outline)
    - Geography of Anguilla (Outline)
    - Geography of Antigua and Barbuda (Outline)
    - Geography of Aruba (Outline)
    - Geography of Bahamas (Outline)
    - Geography of Barbados (Outline)
    - Geography of Bermuda (Outline)
    - British Virgin Islands#Geography (Outline)
    - Cayman Islands#Geography (Outline)
    - Geography of Cuba (Outline)
    - Geography of Dominica (Outline)
    - Dominican Republic#Geography (Outline)
    - Geography of Grenada (Outline)
    - Geography of Haiti (Outline)
    - Geography of Jamaica (Outline)
    - Geography of Montserrat (Outline)
    - Netherlands Antilles#Geography (Outline)
    - Geography of Puerto Rico (Outline)
    - Geography of Saint Barthélemy (Outline)
    - Geography of Saint Kitts and Nevis (Outline)
    - Geography of Saint Lucia (Outline)
    - Saint Martin (Outline)
    - Geography of Saint Vincent and the Grenadines (Outline)
    - Geography of Trinidad and Tobago (Outline)
    - Turks and Caicos Islands#Geography (Outline)
    - United States Virgin Islands#Geography (Outline)
- Geography of Oceania (includes the continent of Australia) (Outline)
  - Australasia
    - Geography of Australia (Outline)
      - Dependencies and territories of Australia
        - Geography of Christmas Island (Outline)
        - Cocos (Keeling) Islands#Geography (Outline)
        - Geography of Norfolk Island (Outline)
    - Geography of New Zealand (Outline)
  - Geography of Melanesia
    - Geography of Fiji (Outline)
    - Geography of Indonesia (Outline) (Oceanian part only)
    - Geography of New Caledonia (Outline) (France)
    - Geography of Papua New Guinea (Outline)
    - Geography of the Solomon Islands (Outline)
    - Geography of Vanuatu (Outline)
  - Geography of Micronesia
    - Geography of Federated States of Micronesia (Outline)
    - Geography of Guam (Outline) (USA)
    - Geography of Kiribati (Outline)
    - Geography of Marshall Islands (Outline)
    - Geography of Nauru (Outline)
    - Northern Mariana Islands#Geography and climate (Outline) (USA)
    - Geography of Palau (Outline)
    - Geography of Wake Island (Outline) (USA)
  - Geography of Polynesia
    - Geography of American Samoa (Outline) (USA)
    - Chatham Islands#Geography (Outline) (NZ)
    - Cook Islands#Geography (Outline) (NZ)
    - Easter Island#Location and physical geography (Outline) (Chile)
    - Geography of French Polynesia (Outline) (France)
    - Geography of Hawaii (Outline) (USA)
    - Loyalty Islands#Geography (Outline) (France)
    - Geography of Niue (Outline) (NZ)
    - Pitcairn Islands#Geography (Outline) (UK)
    - Geography of Samoa (Outline)
    - Geography of Tokelau (Outline) (NZ)
    - Geography of Tonga (Outline)
    - Geography of Tuvalu (Outline)
    - Geography of Wallis and Futuna (Outline) (France)
- Geography of South America (Outline)
  - Geography of Argentina (Outline)
  - Geography of Bolivia (Outline)
  - Geography of Brazil (Outline)
  - Geography of Chile (Outline)
  - Geography of Colombia (Outline)
  - Geography of Ecuador (Outline)
  - Geography of the Falkland Islands (Outline)
  - Geography of French Guiana (Outline)
  - Geography of Guyana (Outline)
  - Geography of Paraguay (Outline)
  - Geography of Peru (Outline)
  - Geography of Suriname (Outline)
  - Geography of Uruguay (Outline)
  - Geography of Venezuela (Outline)

==== Other regions ====
- Atlantic World
- Bermuda Triangle
- Pacific Rim
- Pacific Ring of Fire

== History of geography ==
Reconstruction of Hecataeus' map of the World, created during ancient Greek times

Topics pertaining to the geographical study of the World throughout history:

=== By period ===
- Ancient roads
- Ancient Greek geography
- Age of Discovery
- Major explorations after the Age of Discovery
- Critical geography
- Environmental determinism

=== By region ===
- Chinese geography
  - History of human geography in China

=== By subject ===
- Historical population of the world

==== By field ====
- History of human geography
  - History of cartography – Evolution of the art and science of mapmaking
    - History of longitude – Record of humanity's attempts to find east-west position on Earth
      - Longitude Prize – 2014 British inducement prize contest
  - History of cultural geography
  - History of economic geography
  - History of geography of food
  - History of political geography
  - History of health geography
  - History of political geography
    - History of demography
- History of physical geography
  - History of biogeography
  - History of climatology
  - History of meteorology
  - History of landscape ecology
  - History of quaternary science
  - History of geomorphology
  - History of hydrology
    - History of oceanography
  - History of landscape ecology
- History of regional geography
- History of Technical geography
  - History of geodesy
  - History of geomatics
  - History of quantitative geography
  - History of Geodesign
  - History of Spatial analysis

== Elements of geography ==
Topics common to the various branches of geography include:

=== Tasks and tools of geography ===
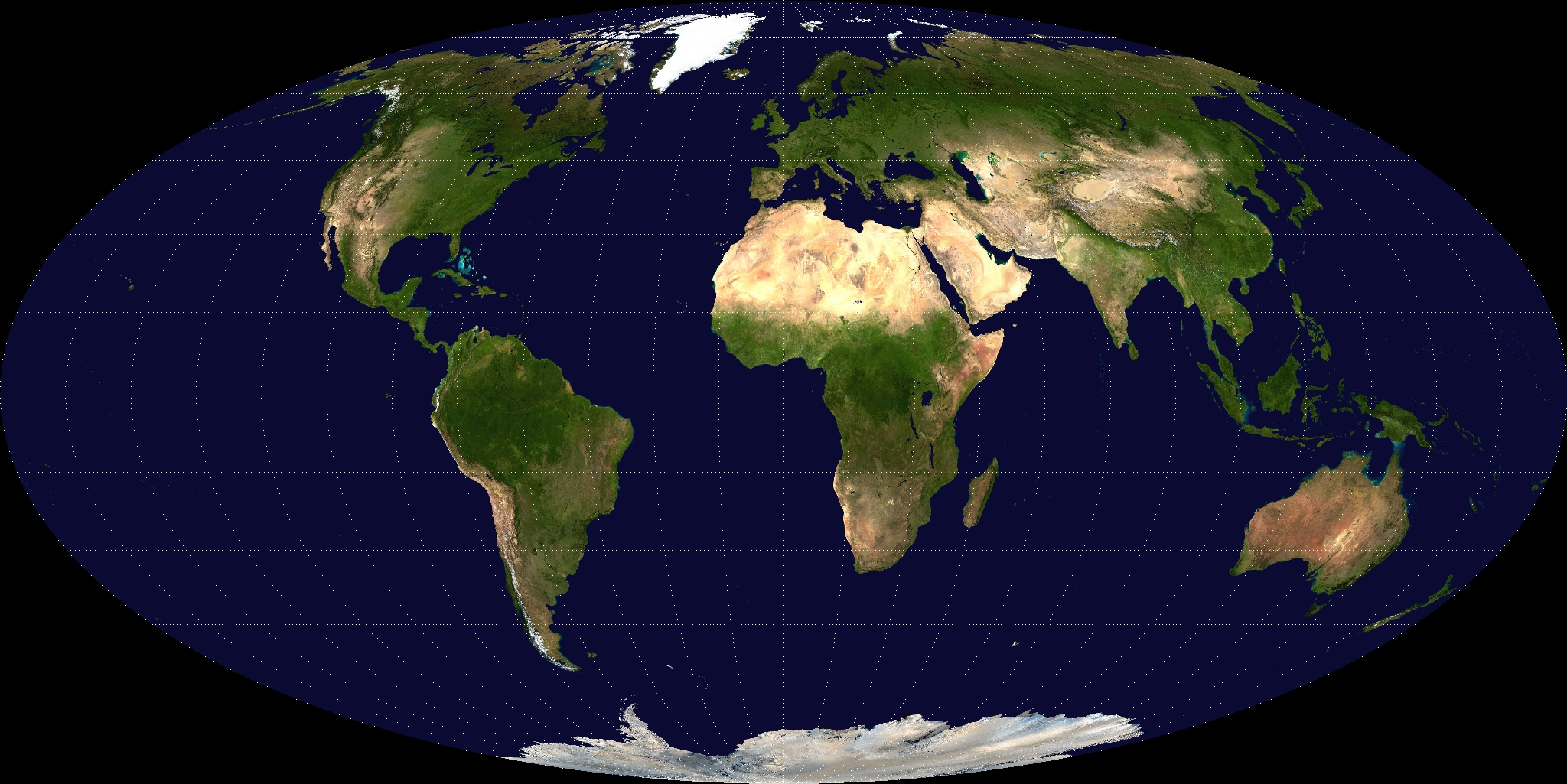
The equal-area Mollweide projection

- Exploration – Investigating an unfamiliar area
- Geocode, also known as Geospatial Entity Object Code – Process of turning a place name/address to coordinates
- Geographic information system (GIS) – System to capture, manage, and present geographic data
- Globe – Scale model of a celestial body
- Map – Symbolic depiction of spatial relationships
  - Atlas – Collection of maps
  - Cartography – Study and practice of making maps
    - Outline of cartography – Overview of and topical guide to cartography
  - Map projection – Systematic representation of the surface of a sphere or ellipsoid onto a plane
- Demographics – Study of human populations and their structures
- Spatial analysis – Techniques to study geometric data
- Surveying – Science of determining the positions of points and the distances and angles between them

=== Types of geographic features ===
Geographic feature – component of a planet that can be referred to as a location, place, site, area, or region, and therefore may show up on a map. A geographic feature may be natural or artificial.

==== Location and place ====
Population density per square kilometre by country, 2006

- Location –
  - Absolute location – Point or an area on Earth's surface or elsewhere
    - Longitude – East-West geographic coordinate
      - Prime meridian – Line of longitude, at which longitude is defined to be 0°
    - Latitude – Geographic coordinate specifying north-south position
      - Equator – Imaginary line halfway between Earth's North and South poles
      - Tropic of Cancer – Line of northernmost latitude at which the Sun can be directly overhead
      - Tropic of Capricorn – Line of southernmost latitude at which the Sun can be directly overhead
      - Arctic Circle – Boundary of the Arctic
      - Antarctic Circle – Boundary of the Antarctic
      - North Pole – Northernmost point on Earth
      - South Pole – Southernmost point on Earth
    - Altitude – Height in relation to a specified reference point
      - Elevation – Height of a geographic location above a fixed reference point
- Place
  - Aspects of a place or region
    - Climate – Long-term weather pattern of a region
    - Population (human biology) – Set of people living in a particular area or interbreeding
      - Demographics – Study of human populations and their structures
        - Population density – Measurement of population size per unit area or unit volume
      - Human overpopulation – Condition wherein human numbers exceed the carrying capacity of the environment
      - World population – Total number of living humans on Earth
    - Sense of place – Term used in behavioral sciences and urban planning
    - Terrain – Dimension and shape of land surfaces
    - Topography – Study of the forms of land surfaces in earth
    - Tourist attraction – Place of interest where tourists visit
  - Lists of places

Geography is a worldwide study

==== Natural geographic features ====
Natural geographic feature – an ecosystem or natural landform.

===== Ecosystems =====
Ecosystem – community of living organisms in conjunction with the nonliving components of their environment (things like air, water and mineral soil), interacting as a system. These biotic and abiotic components are regarded as linked together through nutrient cycles and energy flows.

- Biodiversity hotspot – Biodiverse region under threat
- Realm – broadest biogeographic division of the Earth's land surface, based on distributional patterns of terrestrial organisms.
  - Ecoprovince – biogeographic unit smaller than a realm that contains one or more ecoregions.
    - Ecoregion – Ecological and geographical area
      - Ecodistrict – Environmental planning
      - Ecosection
        - Ecosite
          - Ecotope – Ecologically distinct landscape feature
            - Ecoelement
- Biome – Biogeographical unit with a particular biological community
  - Bioregion – Ecology terminology
    - Biotope – Habitat for communities made up of populations of multiple species
      - Bioelement

===== Natural landforms =====
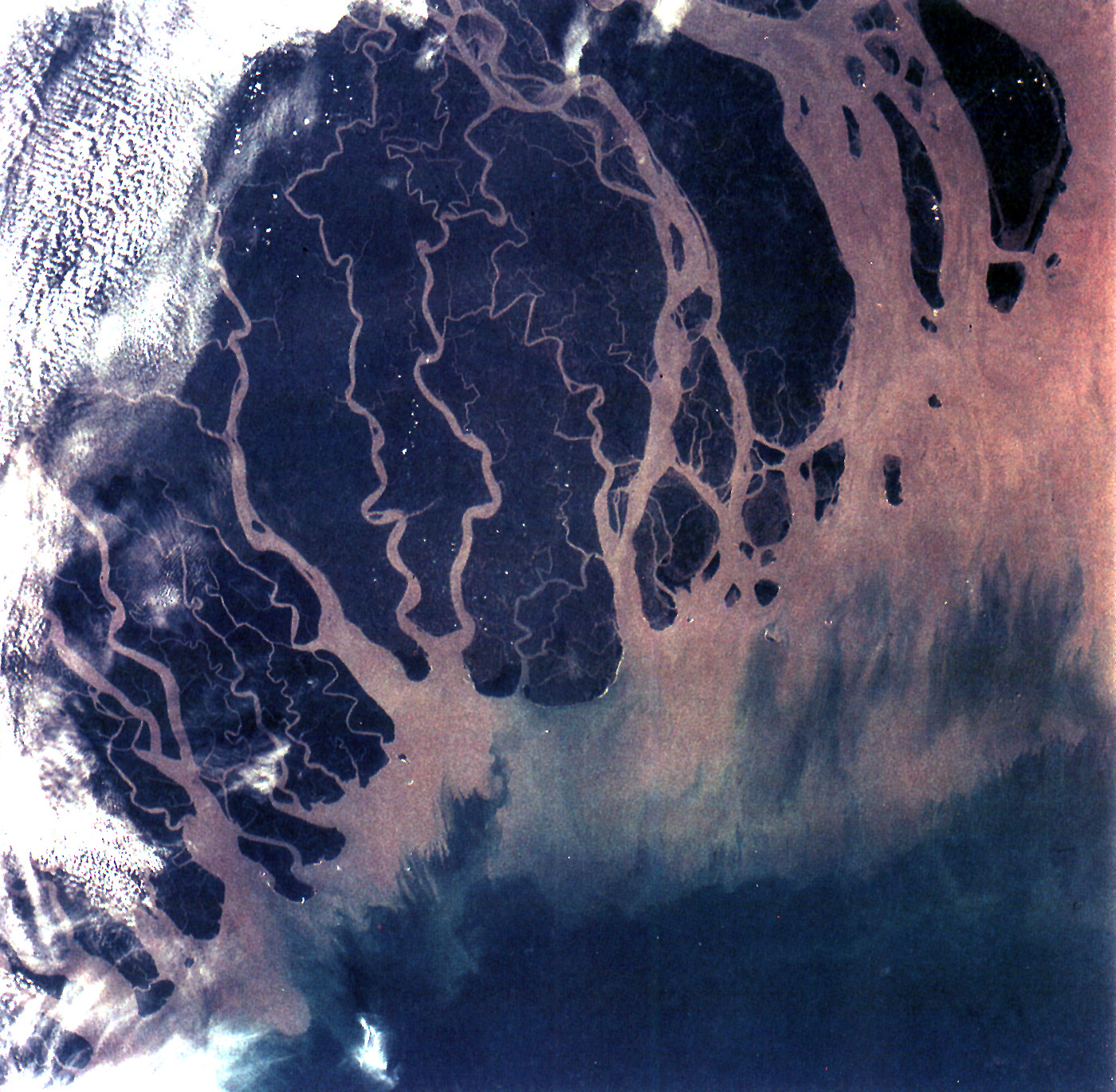
The Ganges river delta in India and Bangladesh is one of the most fertile regions in the world.

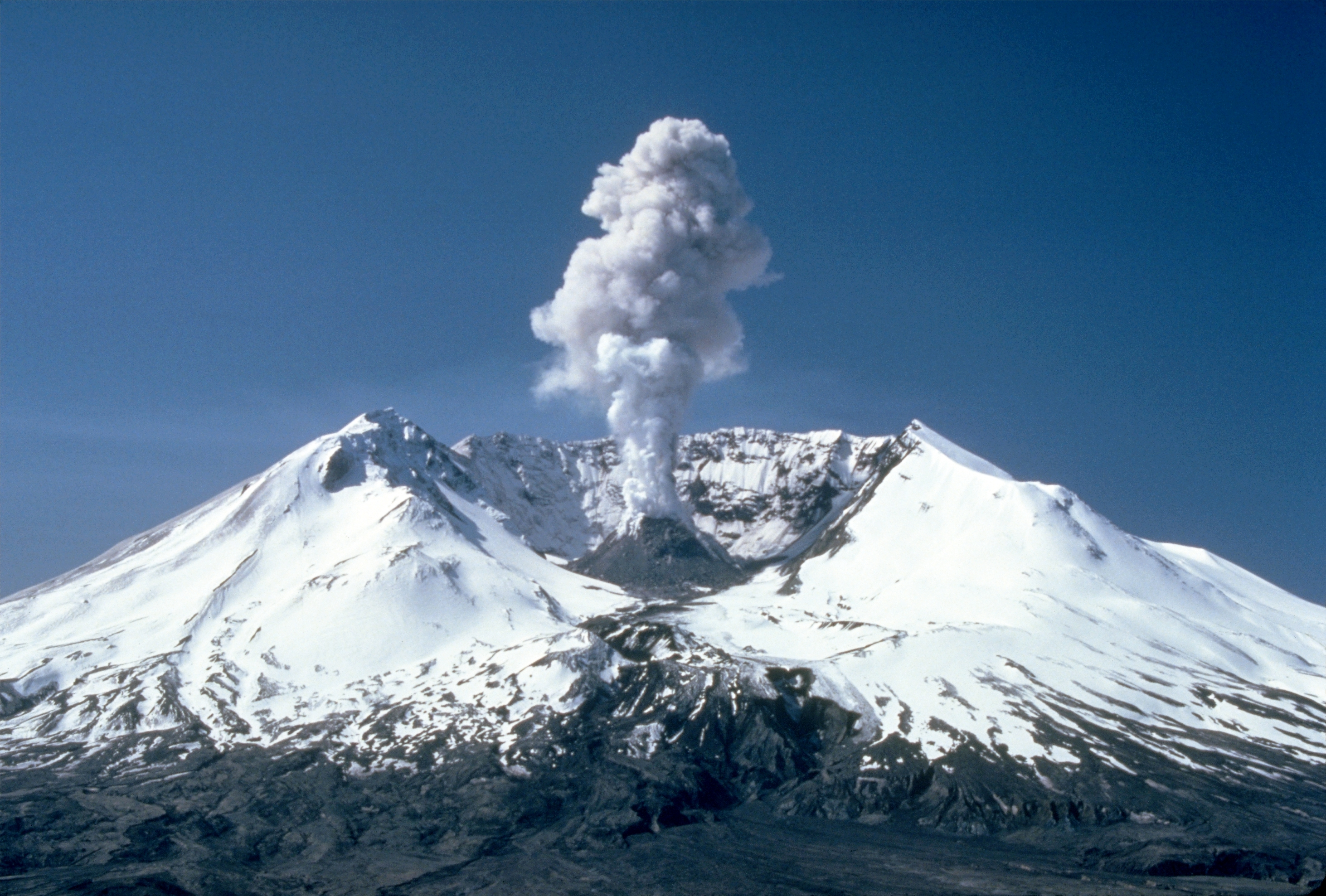
The volcano Mount St. Helens in Washington, United States

Natural landform – terrain or body of water. Landforms are topographical elements, and are defined by their surface form and location in the landscape. Landforms are categorized by traits such as elevation, slope, orientation, stratification, rock exposure, and soil type. Some landforms are artificial, such as certain islands, but most landforms are natural.

==== Natural terrain feature types ====
- Continent – Large geographical region identified by convention
- Island – Piece of subcontinental land surrounded by water
- Mainland – Continental part of any polity or the main island within an island nation
- Mountain – Large natural elevation of the Earth's surface
- Mountain range – Geographic area containing several geologically related mountains
- Peninsula – Landform that extends from a mainland and is surrounded by water on most sides.
- Subcontinent – A large, relatively self-contained landmass forming a subdivision of a continent

==== Natural body of water types ====
- Natural bodies of water – Any significant accumulation of water, generally on a planet's surface
  - Bodies of seawater – Water from a sea or an ocean
    - Channel – Narrow body of water
    - Firth – Scottish word used for various coastal inlets and straits
    - Harbor – Sheltered body of water for mooring
    - Inlet – Indentation of a shoreline
      - Bay – Recessed, coastal body of water connected to an ocean or lake
        - Bight – Shallowly concave bend or curve in a coastline, river, or other geographical feature
        - Gulf – Recessed, coastal body of water connected to an ocean or lake
      - Cove – Small sheltered bay or coastal inlet
      - Creek (tidal) – Inlet or estuary that is affected by ebb and flow of ocean tides
      - Estuary – Partially enclosed coastal body of brackish water
      - Fjord – Long, narrow inlet with steep sides or cliffs, created by glacial activity
    - Kettle – Depression formed by glaciers or floodwaters
    - Kill – Creek, tidal inlet, river, strait, or arm of the sea
    - Lagoon – Shallow body of water separated from a larger one by a narrow landform
      - Barachois – Coastal lagoon partially or totally separated from the ocean by a sand or shingle bar
    - Loch – Irish and Scottish Gaelic word for a lake or sea inlet
      - Arm of the sea –
      - Mere – Lake, pond, or wetland
    - Ocean – Body of salt water covering most of Earth
    - Phytotelma – Small water-filled cavity in a terrestrial plant
    - Salt marsh – Coastal ecosystem between land and open saltwater that is regularly flooded
    - Sea – Large body of salt water
      - Types of sea:
        - Mediterranean sea – Enclosed sea with limited water exchange
        - Sound – Long, wide body of water, connecting two larger bodies
      - Sea components or extensions:
        - Sea loch – Scottish Gaelic and Irish word for a sea inlet
        - Sea lough – Anglicised version of Scottish Gaelic and Irish word for a sea inlet
    - Strait – Waterway connecting two bodies of water
  - Bodies of fresh water
    - Bayou – Body of water in flat, low-lying areas
    - Lake – Large inland body of relatively still water
      - Lists of lakes
      - Oxbow lake – U-shaped lake or pool left by an ancient river meander
      - Subglacial lake – Lake under a glacier
      - Tarn – Mountain lake or pool in a glacial cirque
    - Pool – Deep and slow-moving stretch of a watercourse
      - Pond – Relatively small body of standing water
        - Billabong – Australian term for an oxbow lake or other waterhole
      - Tide pool – Rocky pool on a seashore, separated from the sea at low tide, filled with seawater
      - Vernal pool – Seasonal pools of water that provide habitat
      - Puddle – Small accumulation of liquid, usually water, on a surface
    - River – Natural flowing freshwater stream
      - Lists of rivers
        - Parts of a river:
        - Rapids – River section with increased velocity and turbulence
        - Source – Starting point of a river
        - Waterfall – Point in a river or brook where water flows over a vertical drop
          - List of waterfalls
    - Roadstead – Open anchorage affording some protection, but less than a harbor
    - Spring – A point at which water emenges from an aquifer to the surface
      - Boil -
    - Stream – Body of surface water flowing down a channel
      - Beck – Body of surface water flowing down a channel
      - Brook – Body of surface water flowing down a channel
      - Burn – Term of Scottish origin for a small river
      - Creek – Body of surface water flowing down a channel
        - Arroyo (watercourse) – Dry watercourse with flow after rain
          - Wash – Dry watercourse with flow after rain
          - Draw – Dry watercourse with flow after rain
      - Run – Body of surface water flowing down a channel
    - Wetland – Ecosystem that is flooded or saturated with water
      - Freshwater marsh – Low-lying and seasonally waterlogged land
      - Slough (wetland) – Forested wetland
        - Mangrove swamp – Shrub growing in brackish water

==== Artificial geographic features ====
Artificial geographic feature – a thing that was made by humans that may be indicated on a map. It may be physical and exist in the real world (like a bridge or city), or it may be abstract and exist only on maps (such as the Equator, which has a defined location, but cannot be seen where it lies).

- Settlement – Places where people live and organize society
  - Rural area – Geographic area outside towns and cities
  - Hamlet (place) – Small human settlement in a rural area – rural settlement which is too small to be considered a village. Historically, when a hamlet became large enough to justify building a church, it was then classified as a village. One example of a hamlet is a small cluster of houses surrounding a mill.
  - Village – Human settlement smaller than a town – clustered human settlement or community, larger than a hamlet with the population ranging from a few hundred to a few thousand (sometimes tens of thousands).
  - Town – Type of human settlement – human settlement larger than a village but smaller than a city. The size a settlement must be in order to be called a "town" varies considerably in different parts of the world, so that, for example, many American "small towns" seem to British people to be no more than villages, while many British "small towns" would qualify as cities in the United States.
    - Urban hierarchy – Rank of cities based on their population – ranks the structure of towns within an area.
      - 1st-order towns – bare minimum of essential services, such as bread and milk.
      - 2nd-order towns
      - 3rd-order towns
      - 4th-order towns
  - City – Large permanent human settlement – relatively large and permanent settlement. In many regions, a city is distinguished from a town by attainment of designation according to law, for instance being required to obtain articles of incorporation or a royal charter.
    - Financial centre – Location with high concentration of commerce activity
    - Primate city – Disproportionately largest city of a country or region – the leading city in its country or region, disproportionately larger than any others in the urban hierarchy.
    - Metropolis – Large city or conurbation – very large city or urban area which is a significant economic, political and cultural center for a country or region, and an important hub for regional or international connections and communications.
    - Metropolitan area – Dense urban core together with its satellite cities – region consisting of a densely populated urban core and its less-populated surrounding territories, sharing industry, infrastructure, and housing.
    - Global city – City important to the world economy – city that is deemed to be an important node in the global economic system. Globalization is largely created, facilitated and enacted in strategic geographic locales (including global cities) according to a hierarchy of importance to the operation of the global system of finance and trade.
    - Megalopolis – Grouping of neighbouring metropolises – chain of roughly adjacent metropolitan areas. An example is the huge metropolitan area along the eastern seaboard of the U.S. extending from Boston, Massachusetts through New York City; Philadelphia, Pennsylvania; Baltimore, Maryland and ending in Washington, D.C..
    - Eperopolis – Hypothetical planet-spanning city – theoretical "continent city". The world does not have one yet. Will Europe become the first one?
    - Ecumenopolis – Hypothetical planet-spanning city – theoretical "world city". Will the world ever become so urbanized as to be called this?
- Engineered construct – built feature of the landscape such as a highway, bridge, airport, railroad, building, dam, or reservoir. See also construction engineering and infrastructure.
  - Artificial landforms
    - Artificial dwelling hill – Raised ground to provide a refuge from flooding
    - Artificial island – Island constructed by people
    - Artificial reef – Human-made underwater structure that functions as a reef
  - Airport – Facility with a runway for aircraft – place where airplanes can take off and land, including one or more runways and one or more passenger terminals.
  - Aqueduct – Structure constructed to convey water – artificial channel that is constructed to convey water from one location to another.
  - Breakwater – Coastal defense structure – construction designed to break the force of the sea to provide calm water for boats or ships, or to prevent erosion of a coastal feature.
  - Bridge – Structure built to span physical obstacles – structure built to span a valley, road, body of water, or other physical obstacle such as a canyon, for the purpose of providing passage over the obstacle.
  - Building – Enclosed structure – closed structure with walls and a roof.
  - Canal – Artificial channel for water – artificial waterway, often connecting one body of water with another.
  - Causeway – Route raised up on an embankment
  - Dam – Barrier that stops or slows the flow of water – structure placed across a flowing body of water to stop the flow, usually to use the water for irrigation or to generate electricity.
    - Dike – Ridge or wall to hold back water – barrier of stone or earth used to hold back water and prevent flooding.
      - Levee – Ridge or wall to hold back water – artificial slope or wall to regulate water levels, usually earthen and often parallel to the course of a river or the coast.
  - Farm – Area of land used to produce food and crops – place where agricultural activities take place, especially the growing of crops or the raising of livestock.
  - Manmade harbor – Sheltered body of water for mooring – harbor that has deliberately constructed breakwaters, sea walls, or jetties, or which was constructed by dredging.
  - Industrial region – Geographical region with a high proportion of industrial use
  - Marina – Dock with moorings and facilities for yachts and small boats
  - Orchard – Intentionally planted trees or shrubs that are maintained for food production
  - Parking lot – Cleared area for parking vehicles
  - Pier – Raised structure in a body of water
  - Pipeline – Pumping fluids or gas through pipes
  - Port – Maritime facility where ships may dock to load and discharge passengers and cargo
  - Railway – Structure comprising rails on a foundation intended to carry trains
  - Ranch – Large area of land for raising livestock
  - Reservoir – Bulk storage space for water
  - Road – Land route
    - Highway – Public road or other public way on land
    - Race track – Facility built for racing of animals, vehicles, or athletes
    - Street – Public thoroughfare in a built environment
  - Subsidence crater – Hole or depression left on the surface over the site of an underground explosion
  - Ski resort – Resort developed for skiing, snowboarding, and other winter sports
  - Train station – Railway facility for loading or unloading trains
  - Tree farm – Type of forest planted for high volume production of wood
  - Tunnel – Underground passage made for traffic
  - Viaduct – Multiple-span bridge crossing an extended lower area
  - Wharf – Shoreside structure where ships dock

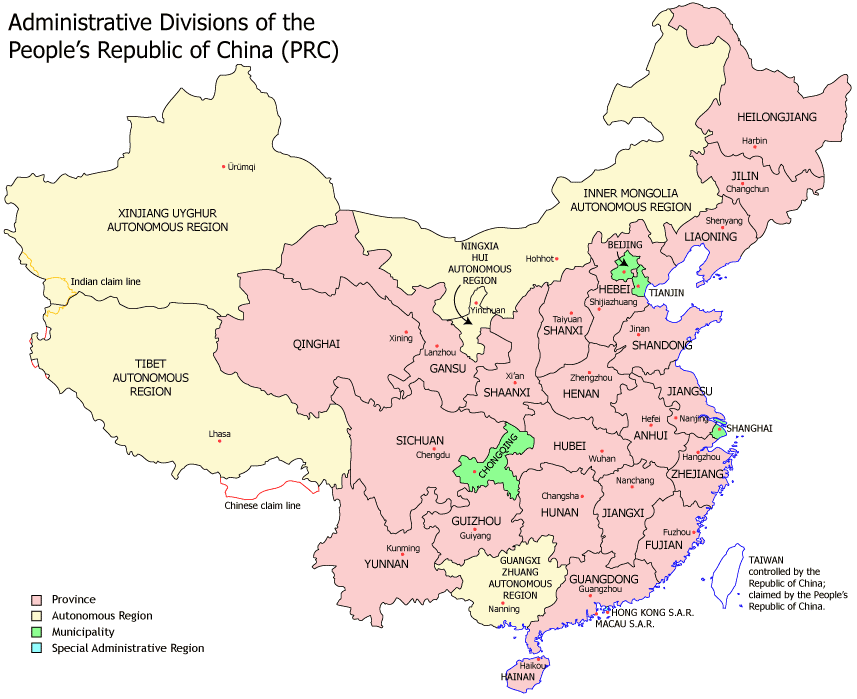
Provinces and territorial disputes of the People's Republic of China

- Abstract geographic feature – does not exist physically in the real world, yet has a location by definition and may be displayed on maps.
  - Geographical zone – Major regions of Earth's surface demarcated by latitude
    - Hardiness zone – Region defined by minimum temperature relevant to the plant survival
    - Time zone – Area that observes a uniform standard time
  - Political division – A territorial entity for administration purposes
    - Nation – Community based on common ethnic, cultural or political identity
    - Administrative division – Territorial entity for administration purposes – a designated territory created within a country for administrative or identification purposes. Examples of the types of administrative divisions:
      - Bailiwick – Area of jurisdiction of a bailiff
      - Canton – Type of administrative division of a country
      - Commune – An urban administrative division having corporate status
      - County – Geographical and administrative region in some countries
      - Department – Administrative or political division in some countries
      - District – Administrative division in some countries, managed by a local government
      - Duchy – Territory ruled by, or representing the title of, a duke or duchess
      - Emirate – Territory governed by an emir
      - Federal state – Type of political entity
      - Parish – Ecclesiastical subdivision of a diocese
      - Prefecture – Administrative jurisdiction or subdivision in various countries
      - Province – Administrative division within a country or state
      - Region – Two or three-dimensionally defined space
      - Rural district – Former type of local government area in England, Wales, and Ireland
      - Settlement – Places where people live and organize society
        - Municipality – Local government area
        - City – Large permanent human settlement
          - Borough – Administrative division in some English-speaking countries
          - Township – Type of settlement or urban area
        - Village – Human settlement smaller than a town
      - Shire – Traditional British term for county
      - Special Economic Zone – Region with specialized business and trade laws
      - State – Territorial and constitutional community forming part of a federal union
      - Subdistrict
      - Subprefecture – Administrative division of a country that is below prefecture
      - Voivodeship – Administrative division in several countries of central and eastern Europe
      - Wilayat – Administrative division approximating a state or province
  - Cartographical feature – theoretical construct used specifically on maps that doesn't have any physical form apart from its location.
    - Latitude line – Geographic coordinate specifying north-south position
      - Equator – Imaginary line halfway between Earth's North and South poles
    - Longitude line – East-West geographic coordinate
      - Prime Meridian – A line of longitude, at which longitude is defined to be 0°
    - Geographical pole – Points on a rotating astronomical body where the axis of rotation intersects the surface
      - North Pole – Northernmost point on Earth
      - South Pole – Southernmost point on Earth

==== Geographic features that include the natural and artificial ====
- Waterway – Any navigable body of water
  - List of waterways

== Geography awards ==
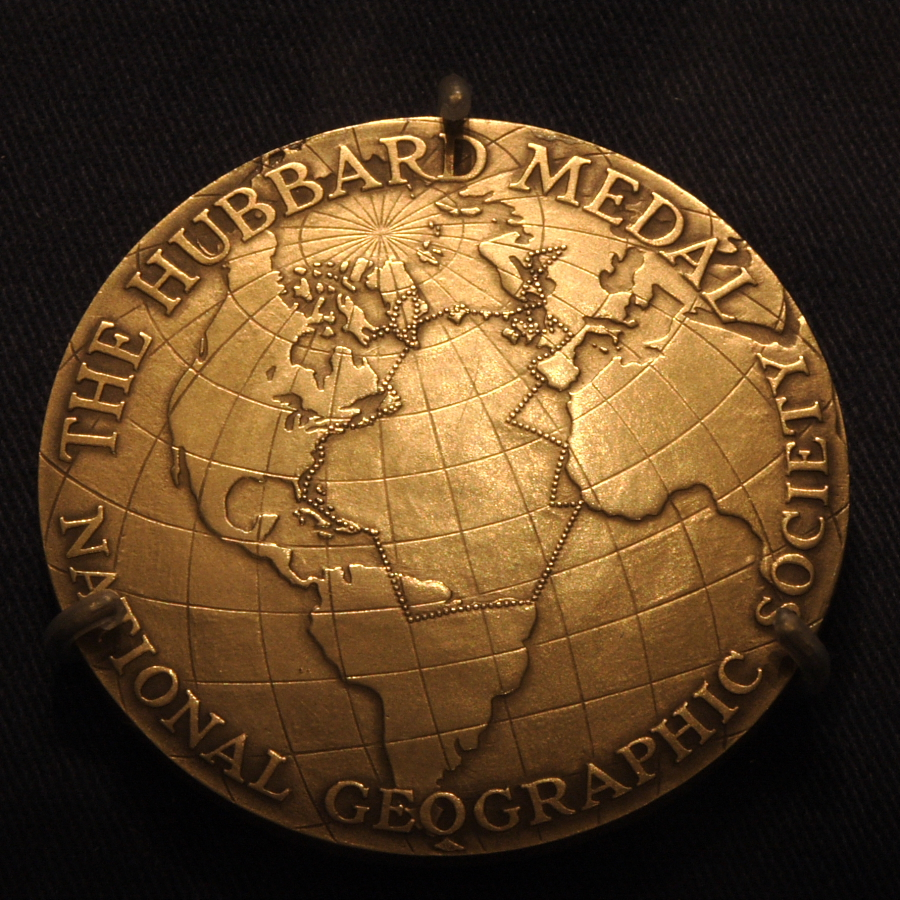
Hubbard Medal awarded to Anne Morrow Lindbergh, showing her flight route

Some awards and competitions in the field of geography:

- Geography Cup – 2006 online geography competition
- Founder's Medal – List of geography award winners
- Patron's Medal – Award presented by the Royal Geographical Society
- Hubbard Medal – Medal awarded by the National Geographic Society
- National Geographic World Championship – Biennial, two-day-long international geography competition
- Victoria Medal – British geography award

== Geographical organizations ==
See: List of geographical societies

- European Geography Association
- EUROGEO-European Association of Geographers
- Gamma Theta Upsilon
- International Geographical Union

== Geographical publications ==
=== Geographical magazines ===
- Al Arab
- Arizona Highways
- Asian Geographic
- Atlas (magazine)
- Australian Geographic
- Canadian Geographic
- Chinese National Geography
- Le Congo illustré
- GEO (magazine)
- Géographica
- Geographical
- Icelandic Geographic
- Le Mouvement Géographique
- National Geographic
- National Geographic Adventure
- National Geographic Kids
- National Geographic Traveler
- New Zealand Geographic
- Podróże
- Revista Geográfica Española
- Rhythms Monthly
- Vokrug sveta
- Walkabout
- The Wide World Magazine

== Persons influential in geography ==
A geographer is a scientist who studies Earth's physical environment and human habitat. Geographers are historically known for making maps, the subdiscipline of geography known as cartography. They study the physical details of the environment and also its effect on human and wildlife ecologies, weather and climate patterns, economics, and culture. Geographers focus on the spatial relationships between these elements.

=== Influential physical geographers ===
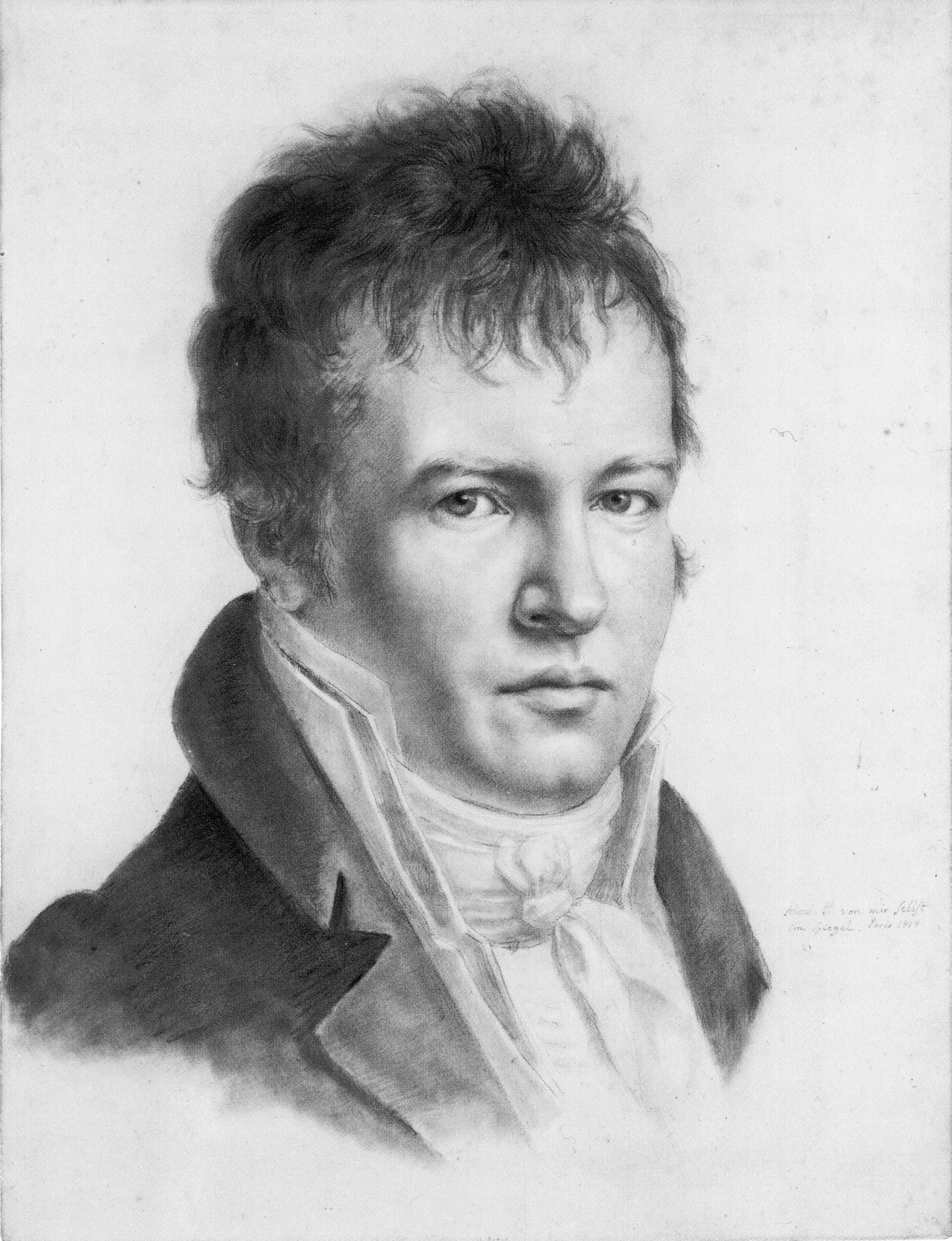
Alexander von Humboldt, considered to be the founding father of physical geography

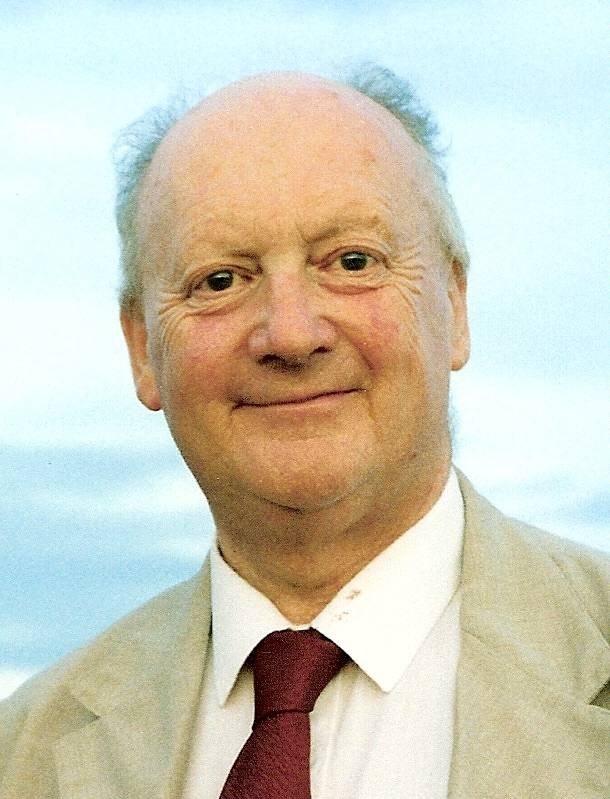
Richard Chorley, 20th-century geographer who progressed quantitative geography and who helped bring the systems approach to geography

- Eratosthenes (276 – 194 BC) – who made the first known reliable estimation of the Earth's size. He is considered the father of geodesy.
- Ptolemy (c. 90 – c. 168) – who compiled Greek and Roman knowledge to produce the book Geographia.
- Abū Rayhān Bīrūnī (973 – 1048 AD) – considered the father of geodesy.
- Ibn Sina (Avicenna, 980–1037) – whose observations in Kitab Al-Shifa contributed to later formulations of the law of superposition and concept of uniformitarianism.
- Muhammad al-Idrisi (Dreses, 1100 – c.1165) – who drew the Tabula Rogeriana, the most accurate world map in pre-modern times.
- Piri Reis (1465 – c.1554) – whose Piri Reis map is the oldest surviving world map to include the Americas and possibly Antarctica
- Gerardus Mercator (1512–1594) – an innovative cartographer and originator of the Mercator projection.
- Bernhardus Varenius (1622–1650) – Wrote his important work "General Geography" (1650) – first overview of the geography, the foundation of modern geography.
- Mikhail Lomonosov (1711–1765) – father of Russian geography and founded the study of glaciology.
- Alexander von Humboldt (1769–1859) – considered the father of modern geography. Published Kosmos and founded the study of biogeography.
- Arnold Henry Guyot (1807–1884) – who noted the structure of glaciers and advanced the understanding of glacial motion, especially in fast ice flow.
- Louis Agassiz (1807–1873) – the author of a glacial theory which disputed the notion of a steady-cooling Earth.
- Alfred Russel Wallace (1823–1913) – founder of modern biogeography and the Wallace line.
- Vasily Dokuchaev (1846–1903) – patriarch of Russian geography and founder of pedology.
- Wladimir Peter Köppen (1846–1940) – developer of most important climate classification and founder of Paleoclimatology.
- William Morris Davis (1850–1934) – father of American geography, founder of Geomorphology and developer of the geographical cycle theory.
- Walther Penck (1888–1923) – proponent of the cycle of erosion and the simultaneous occurrence of uplift and denudation.
- Sir Ernest Shackleton (1874–1922) – Antarctic explorer during the Heroic Age of Antarctic Exploration.
- Robert E. Horton (1875–1945) – founder of modern hydrology and concepts such as infiltration capacity and overland flow.
- J Harlen Bretz (1882–1981) – pioneer of research into the shaping of landscapes by catastrophic floods, most notably the Bretz (Missoula) floods.
- Willi Dansgaard (1922–2011) – palaeoclimatologist and quaternary scientist, instrumental in the use of oxygen-isotope dating and co-identifier of Dansgaard–Oeschger events.
- Hans Oeschger (1927–1998) – palaeoclimatologist and pioneer in ice core research, co-identifier of Dansgaard-Orschger events.
- Richard Chorley (1927–2002) – a key contributor to the quantitative revolution and the use of systems theory in geography.
- Sir Nicholas Shackleton (1937–2006) – who demonstrated that oscillations in climate over the past few million years could be correlated with variations in the orbital and positional relationship between the Earth and the Sun.
- Stefan Rahmstorf (born 1960) – professor of abrupt climate changes and author on theories of thermohaline dynamics.

=== Influential human geographers ===
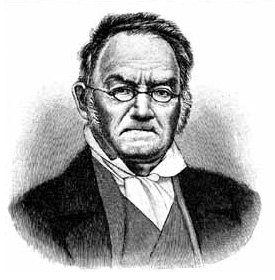
Sketch of Carl Ritter

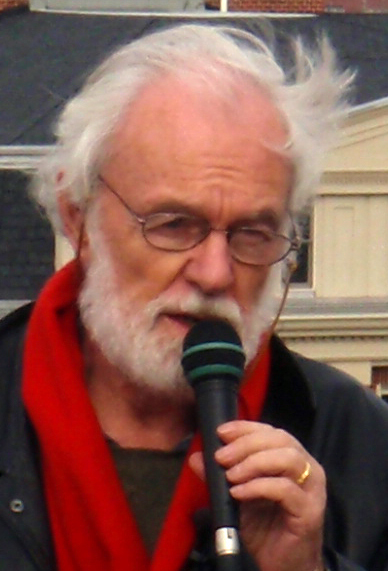
David Harvey

- Carl Ritter (1779–1859) – considered to be one of the founding fathers of modern geography and first chair in geography at the Humboldt University of Berlin, also noted for his use of organic analogy in his works.
- Friedrich Ratzel (1844–1904) – environmental determinist, invented the term Lebensraum
- Paul Vidal de la Blache (1845–1918) – founder of the French School of geopolitics and possibilism.
- Sir Halford John Mackinder (1861–1947) – author of The Geographical Pivot of History, co-founder of the London School of Economics, along with the Geographical Association.
- Carl O. Sauer (1889–1975) – critic of environmental determinism and proponent of cultural ecology.
- Walter Christaller (1893–1969) – economic geographer and developer of the central place theory.
- Richard Hartshorne (1899–1992) – scholar of the history and philosophy of geography.
- Torsten Hägerstrand (1916–2004) – critic of the quantitative revolution and regional science, noted figure in critical geography.
- Milton Santos (1926–2001) winner of the Vautrin Lud prize in 1994, one of the most important geographers in South America.
- Waldo R. Tobler (1930–2018) – developer of the First law of geography.
- Yi-Fu Tuan (1930–2022) A Chinese-American geographer.
- David Harvey (born 1935) – world's most cited academic geographer and winner of the Lauréat Prix International de Géographie Vautrin Lud, also noted for his work in critical geography and critique of global capitalism.
- Evelyn Stokes (1936–2005). Professor of geography at the University of Waikato in New Zealand. Known for recognizing inequality with marginalized groups, including women and Māori using geography.
- Allen J. Scott (born 1938) – winner of Vautrin Lud Prize in 2003 and the Anders Retzius Gold medal 2009; author of numerous books and papers on economic and urban geography, known for his work on regional development, new industrial spaces, agglomeration theory, global city-regions and the cultural economy.
- Edward Soja (1941–2015) – noted for his work on regional development, planning, and governance, along with coining the terms synekism and postmetropolis.
- Doreen Massey (1944–2016) – key scholar in the space and places of globalization and its pluralities, winner of the Vautrin Lud Prize.
- Michael Watts, Class of 1963 Professor of Geography and Development Studies, University of California, Berkeley
- Nigel Thrift (born 1949) – developer of non-representational theory.
- Derek Gregory (born 1951) – famous for writing on the Israeli, U.S. and UK actions in the Middle East after 9/11, influenced by Edward Said and has contributed work on imagined geographies.
- Cindi Katz (born 1954) – who writes on social reproduction and the production of space. Writing on children's geographies, place and nature, everyday life and security.
- Gillian Rose (born 1962) – most famous for her critique: Feminism & Geography: The Limits of Geographical Knowledge (1993) – which was one of the first moves towards development of feminist geography.

== Geography educational frameworks ==
Educational frameworks upon which primary and secondary school curricula for geography are based include:

- Five themes of geography – Educational tool
  1. Location – Point or an area on Earth's surface or elsewhere – a position or point that something occupies on the Earth's surface.
  2. Place – Point or an area on Earth's surface or elsewhere
  3. Human-environment interaction – Study of interactions between societies and their natural environments
  4. movement –
  5. Region – Two or three-dimensionally defined space
- The six "essential elements" identified by the Geography Education Standards Project, under which the National Geography Standards they developed are organized:
  1. The World in spatial terms
  2. Places and regions
  3. Physical systems
  4. Human systems
  5. Environment and society
  6. The uses of geography
- The three content areas of geography from the 2010 National Assessment of Educational Progress (U.S.):
  1. Space and place
  2. Environment and society
  3. Spatial dynamics and connections

== See also ==
- Gazetteer
- Geographer
- Geographical renaming
- Geography and places reference tables
- Landform
- List of explorers
  - List of Russian explorers
- Map
- Navigator
- Philosophy of geography
- World map
