= Internet geography =

Internet geography, also called cybergeography, is a subfield of geography that studies how the internet is organized from social, economic, cultural, and technological perspectives. The Oxford Internet Institute mapped the geographic distribution of Internet users, demonstrating the differences in internet use across varying countries and regions. Internet geography also considers the physical infrastructure and geographic networks that support internet activity.

The core assumption of Internet geography is that the location of servers, websites, data, services, and infrastructure is key to understanding the development and the dynamics of the Internet. This perspective emphasizes that the Internet is not a "placeless" network as research finds its development is influenced by geographic distance and the existing distribution of infrastructure. Its functioning depends on unevenly distributed physical infrastructure such as servers, undersea cables, and data centers /located in specific geographic regions. Zook shows that the Internet has distinct geographic patterns rather than existing independently of physical location by examining geographic distribution of internet infrastructure and activity. For instance, the Internet's topology may be mapped by determining how fast data is transmitted between points using methods such as ping.

== Information Geography ==
One topic covered by this discipline is information geography. For instance, programs that connect to the Internet, such as search engines and social media applications, enable users to sort and view the mass of information on the Internet. The geographic distribution of internet activity can be used to study how information is created, shared, and accessed online.

== Digital Divides ==
Another topic that Internet geography examines is digital divides, which refers to unequal access to and use of the internet across different regions and populations. Internet geography examines how access to and participation in online information differ.
