= Geography Cup =

2006 online geography competition

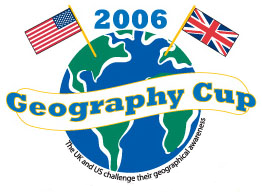
- Website type: Competition
- Available in: English
- Owners: A Broader View, Give Geography its Place, and Nelson Thornes
- Creators: Roger Andresen and Daniel Raven-Ellison
- Website: www.geographycup.com
- Commercial: No
- Registration: Required, free
- Launched: November 2006
- Current status: Semi-active

The Geography Cup is an online, international competition between the United States and the United Kingdom, with the aim of determining which nation collectively knows more about geography. It was also intended to raise awareness of the importance of world geography in the modern world. Any resident of the US or UK could participate to test their own geographic knowledge and to support their nation. The first (and so far only) competition took place between 12 November and 31 December 2006 to coincide with Geography Awareness Week, the third week in November.

== Creation ==
The Geography Cup was created in late 2006 by two geography enthusiasts: Roger Andresen from Atlanta, Georgia, and Daniel Raven-Ellison, a geography teacher from Reading, Berkshire. Both became committed to expanding public awareness of the importance of geography after seeing the results of polls illustrating Americans' and Britons' startling lack of geographical knowledge. A poll of young Americans conducted in the United States by National Geographic in 2006 found that only 37% of those polled could find Iraq on a map, and half could not even find the state of New York.

Andresen and Raven-Ellison created the competition for two main reasons. One reason was to determine whether people who live in the United States or people who live in the United Kingdom knew more about world geography. However, the main reason was to encourage people to learn more about world geography and to understand the importance of geography.

The two creators plan to hold the competition yearly beginning in the third week in November to coincide with Geography Awareness Week, established in the United States by Ronald Reagan in 1987. In 2007, more than 18,000 people participated.

== Quiz ==
Any citizen of the USA or the UK was eligible to participate in the contest. Upon signup, the website determined which country a user lived in based on their IP address and automatically put the user into the correct team. The quiz consisted of thirteen random, geography-related questions that had to be answered in a total of two minutes. The first ten questions consisted of placing randomly selected countries onto a blank political map. The final three questions consisted of geography-related trivia questions that were answered by selecting the correct country on the blank map. Each user could practice, affect their own score, and learn about geography by playing as many times as they wanted to, but only three plays per 24-hour period could affect their nation's score.

The randomly selected countries could be any country (or territory) in the world. This included the large and well-known regions (Russia, Canada, United States, etc.) as well as smaller and more obscure nations (Palau, Djibouti, Togo, etc.). Most participants had little trouble recognizing the major European and Asian countries but many people on both teams had trouble locating small Pacific Islands and some African countries.

The trivia questions were sometimes related directly to geography, e. g., "Made up of 33 atolls, which country straddles both the equator and the International Date Line?" (Kiribati). However, some were about current events to test if participants knew where, geographically, news stories were taking place, e. g., "Which Asian country recently made its first test of a nuclear weapon?" (North Korea).

== Scoring ==
=== Scoring method ===
Due to the large difference in population between the United States and the United Kingdom, the score of each team was determined by an average percentage based on the percentage scores of each individual player. After each game, a player could see how he or she affected their nation's score and their own personal percentage. Because there were 13 questions, each question was worth approximately 7.7%.

=== 2006 final score ===
The USA won with a final accuracy score of 62.368% after trailing for a few days, while the UK lagged behind slightly at the end with an accuracy of 57.947%. The USA had 41,885 participants while the UK team had 10,820, indicating about 30% greater per capita participation in the UK.

=== Website problems ===
Users in Britain using Internet Explorer reported some problems with the website. Also, some US and UK residents were rejected or put into the incorrect team because their internet service provider used overseas servers. Finally, after the surge of media attention following the Reuters and Christian Science Monitor articles, the number of users exceeded the capacity of the servers, causing a temporary suspension of the competition.

== Sponsors and supporters ==
=== Sponsors ===
The Geography Cup was sponsored by A Broader View, founded by Roger Andresen to decrease geographical ignorance with geography puzzles and games. It is also sponsored by Give Geography Its Place, founded by Daniel Raven-Ellison and David Rayner to raise awareness of the importance geography in UK media. The third sponsor is Nelson Thornes, a UK-based educational publisher owned by Wolters Kluwer.

=== Support ===
The Geographic Alliance in Nevada (GAIN), part of National Geographic EdNet, encouraged its members to participate in the competition in the belief that "It is only fitting that these two countries compete in a geography competition, as they both share the same widely-publicized affliction." Polls in the United States, including the National Geographic-Roper poll, and similar polls in the UK, which include a magazine poll cited by the BBC, illustrate a glaring lack of geographic knowledge by young people on both sides of the Atlantic Ocean. In addition, a group of geography teachers and enthusiasts from the UK on a Staffordshire Learning Net geography forum supported the competition and encouraged students to try to improve their nation's score.

== See also ==
- List of basic geography topics
- List of geography topics
- List of countries
- Map
- Cartography
