= Rhythms Monthly =

Chinese language geographic magazine based in Taipei, Taiwan

- Editor: Wang Chih-hong (王志宏)
- Categories: Geography, Science, Culture, History, Archaeology, Society, Nature, Environment, Conservation, Exploration
- Frequency: Monthly
- First issue: August 1998
- Country: Taiwan
- Based in: Taipei
- Language: Chinese (traditional)
- Website: www.rhythmsmonthly.com (in Chinese)

Rhythms Monthly (Chinese: 經典雜誌; pinyin: Jīngdiǎn Zázhì) is a Chinese language geographic magazine based in Taipei, Taiwan. Published in a format similar to the National Geographic Magazine, Rhythms Monthly reports on cultural, historical, environmental and humanitarian themes, often from and for a Chinese perspective. The magazine is supported by Tzu Chi, one of Taiwan's largest Buddhist non-profit organizations.

The magazine is known for its multi-year reportage projects. Recent historical series have included a contemporary retracing of the Silk Road journey of the Tang Dynasty Buddhist monk Xuanzang (玄奘) and the epic sea voyage of Admiral Zheng He (鄭和) (1371-1435 AD). Both historical series predate similar treatments by Discovery Channel and National Geographic.

Rhythms Monthly also supports and executes exploratory expeditions, recently including determining the source of Yangtze River and tracing the riverhead of Mekong River. Working alongside Tzu Chi, the magazine often provides coverage of humanitarian efforts in natural disasters like the 2003 Bam earthquake in Iran, the 2004 tsunami, Hurricane Katrina, Cyclone Nargis in Burma and the 2008 Sichuan earthquake in China.

Rhythms Monthly has received 21 Golden Tripod awards, the official publication award in Taiwan, and two awards from SOPA (The Society of Publishers in Asia) in 2005 and 2006.

The magazine also has a weekly television show titled "Rhythms.TV", broadcast internationally by the Daai Television Network.
