= Five themes of geography =

Educational tool

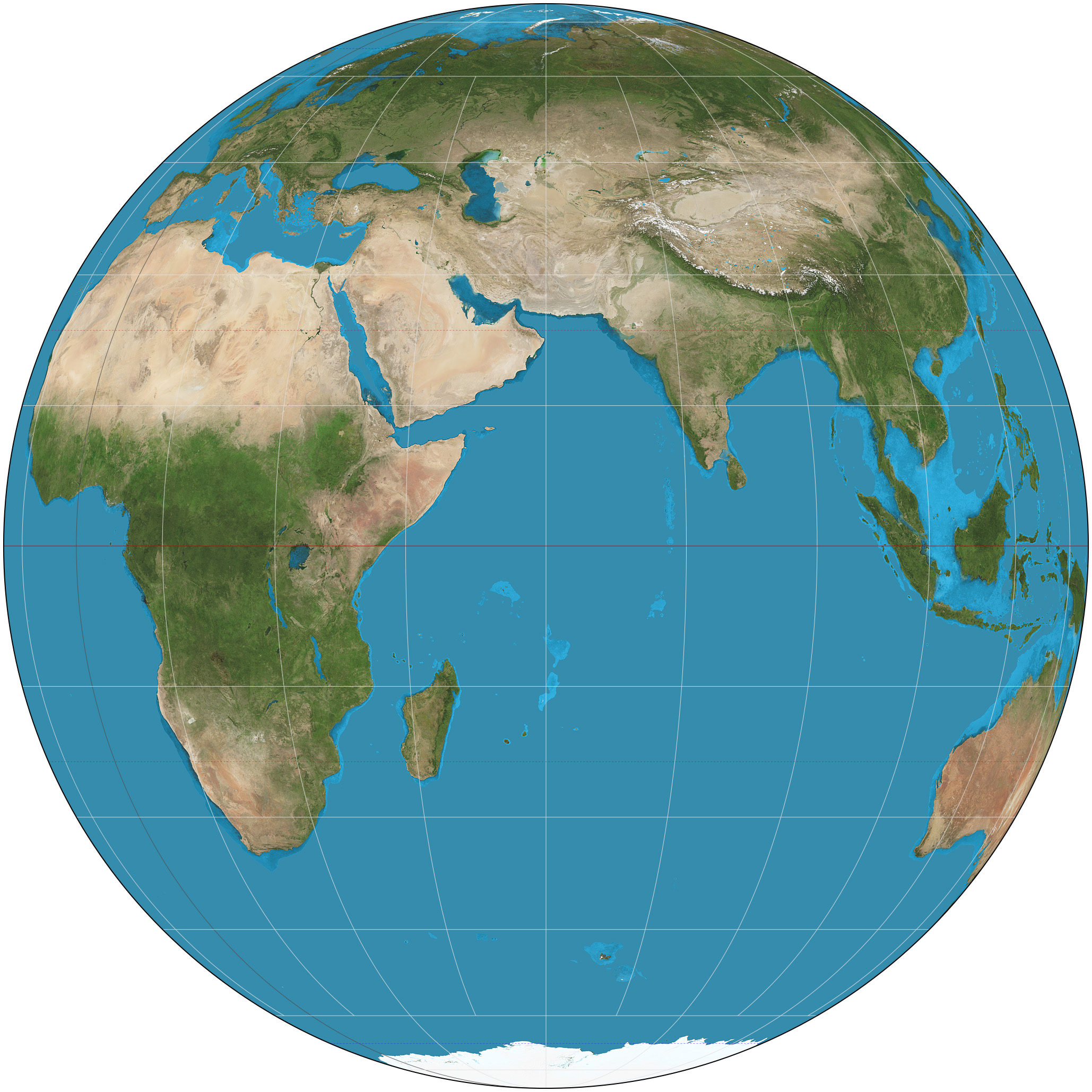
Location

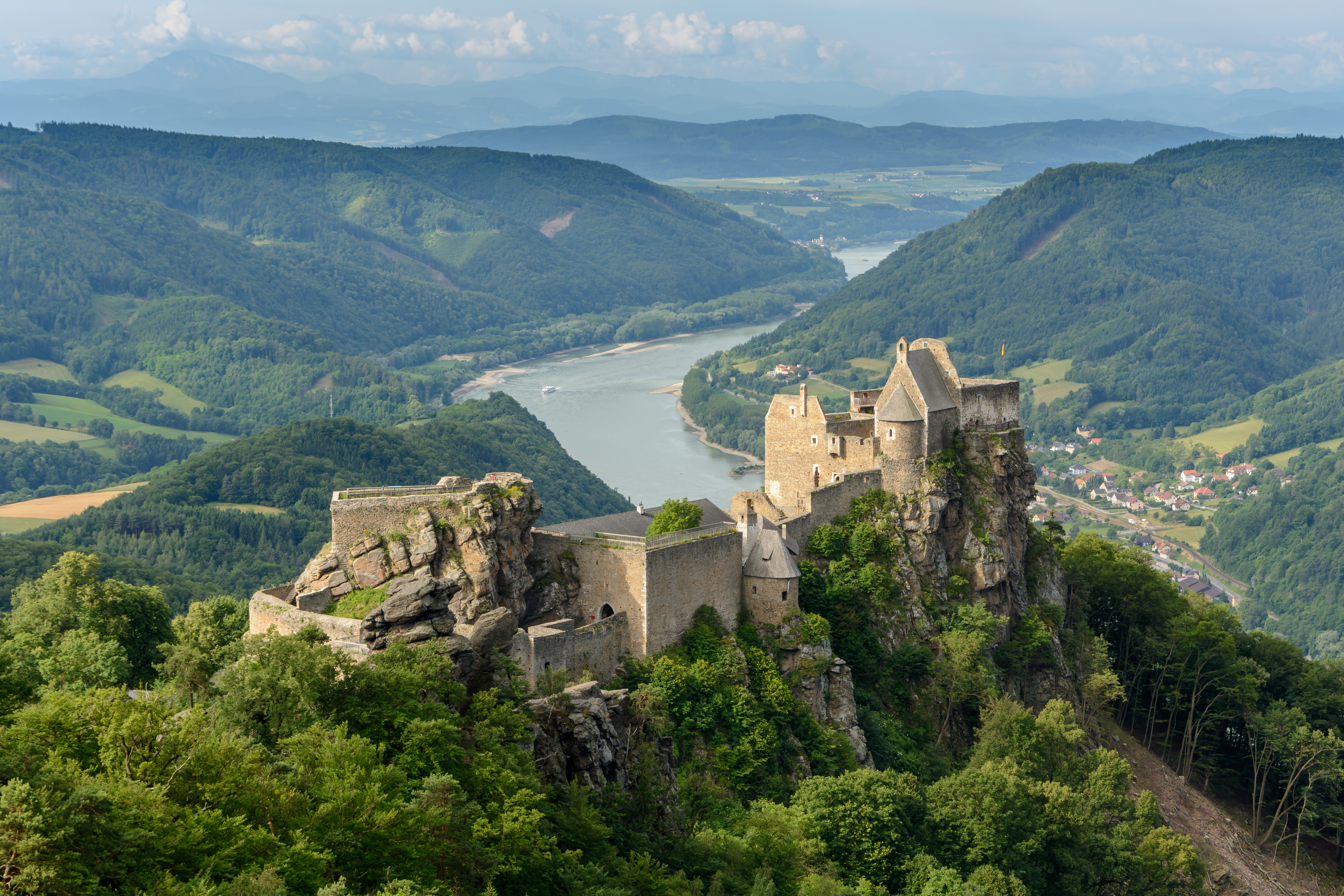
Place

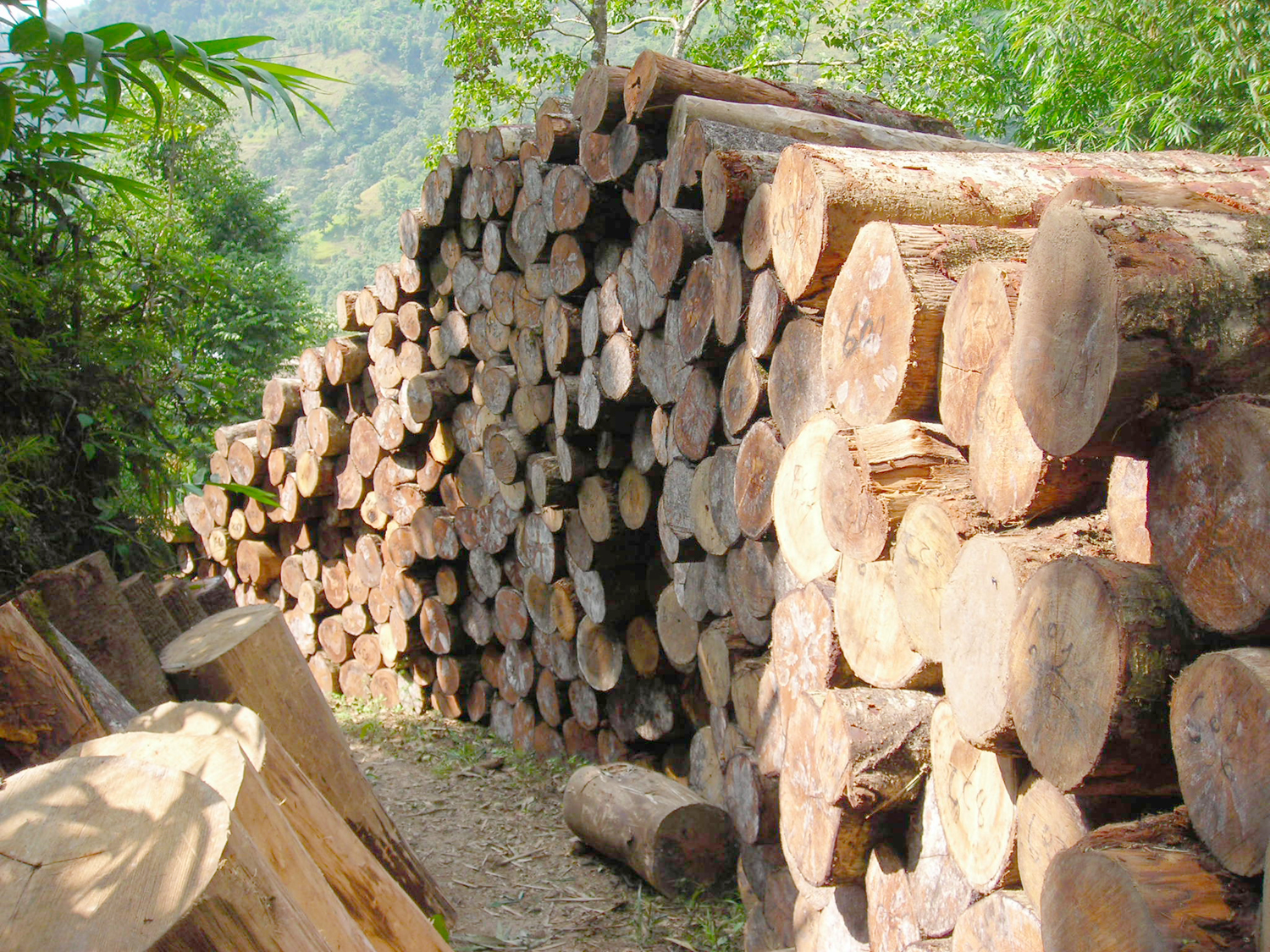
Human-Environment Interaction

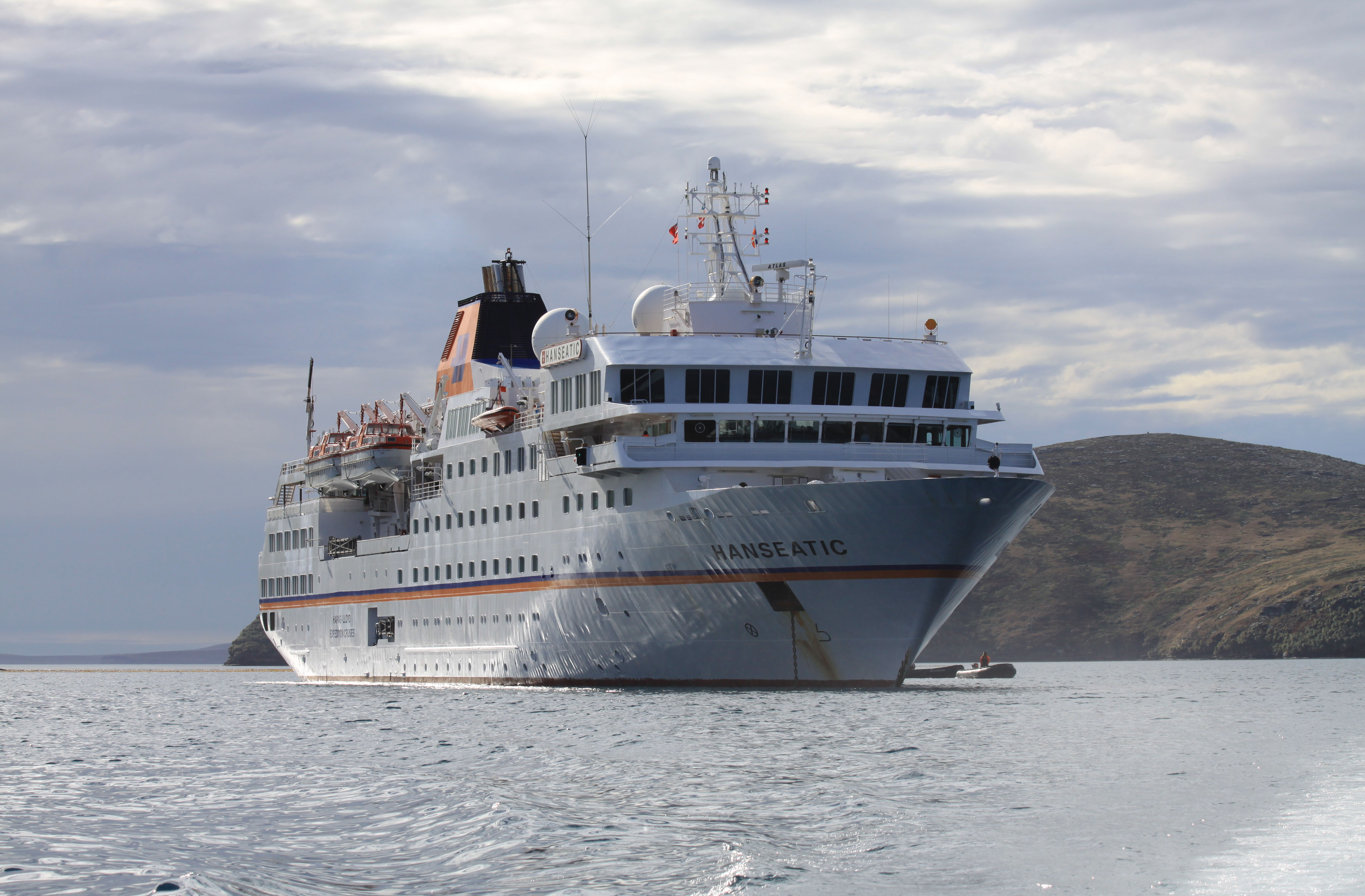
Movement

Region

The five themes of geography are an educational tool for teaching geography. The five themes were published in 1984 and widely adopted by teachers, textbook publishers, and curriculum designers in the United States. Most American geography and social studies classrooms have adopted the five themes in teaching practices, as they provide "an alternative to the detrimental, but unfortunately persistent, habit of teaching geography through rote memorization". They are pedagogical themes that guide how geographic content should be taught in schools.

== Themes ==
Five Themes of geography:

- Location
- Place
- Human-Environment Interaction
- Movement
- Region

=== Location ===
Every point on Earth has a location. Location can be described in two different ways:

- Absolute location, a location as described by its latitude and longitude on the Earth. For example, the coordinates of Albany, New York are 42.6525° N, 73.7572° W.
- Relative location, a location as described by where it is compared to something else. For example, Albany, New York is roughly 140 miles north of New York City.

Every site on Earth has a unique absolute location, which can be identified with a reference grid (such as latitude and longitude). Maps and globes can be used to find location and can also be used to convey other types of geographical information. Map projections are used to represent the three-dimensional Earth on a two-dimensional map. The Earth's position relative to the Sun affects climate, seasons, and time zones. Location as a theme helps teachers to demonstrate to students that observers have to know and be able to explain where something is before it can be examined geographically. It allows the examination of spatial relationships using spatial ideas such as distance, direction, adjacency, proximity, and enclosure.

=== Place ===
A place is an area that is defined by everything in it. It differs from location in that a place is conditions and features, and location is a position in space. Places have physical characteristics, such as landforms and plant and animal life, as well as human characteristics, such as economic activities and languages. All places have features that give them personality and distinguish them from other places. It is a combination of the “features, perceptions, and activities that occur in a given location".

- Toponym: a place name, especially one derived from a topographical feature.
- Site: an area of ground on which a town, building, or monument is constructed.
- Situation: the location and surroundings of a place.
- Population: the number of people that live in the area.

=== Human-environment interaction ===
This theme describes how people interact with the environment, and how the environment responds, with three key concepts:

- Dependency: Humans depend on the environment.
- Adaptation: Humans adapt to the environment.
- Modification: Humans modify the environment.

Sub-themes include "the earth as an environmental system" (including the role and problems of technology, environmental hazards and limits, and adaptation) and "ethics and values" (differing cultural values and the trade-off between economic development and environmental protection). In the original 1984 Guidelines for Geographic Education: Elementary and Secondary Schools, this was called “relationships within places". It focused on the advantages and disadvantages for human settlement in places. It was later renamed to human-environment interaction. This theme is not exclusive to geography, as it is a goal for many disciplines of study.

=== Movement ===
Movement is the travel of people, goods, and ideas from one location to another. Examples of movement include the United States' westward expansion, the Information Revolution, and immigration. New devices such as the airplane and the Internet allow physical and ideological goods to be transferred long distances in short time intervals. A person's travel from place to place, and the actions they perform there are also considered movement.

Places are connected by movement:

- Methods of transportation (transportation geography) – public transportation, private transportation, freight transportation
- Movement in everyday life
- History of movement
- Economic factors influencing movement
- Energy or mass induced movement – the water cycle, tectonic plates, movements within ecosystems, etc.
- Global interdependence
- Models of human interaction, including gravity models and central place theory

In the original 1984 Guidelines for Geographic Education: Elementary and Secondary Schools document, movement was called “relationships between places". Transportation routes and telephone lines that link people all over the world are visible examples of relationships between places.

=== Region ===
Regions are areas with distinctive characteristics: human characteristics, such as demographics or politics, and physical characteristics, such as climate and vegetation. For example, the US is a political region because it shares one governmental system.

Regions may have clear, well-defined borders or vague boundaries.

- Uniform region – "defined by some uniform cultural or physical characteristic", such as the Bible Belt or New England
- Functional region – space organized around a focal point, such as a metropolitan area or around the flow of something, like the water of the Amazon Basin, or the flow of travelers in an airport
- Cultural diversity – regions are a way to understand human diversity.

Uniform regions and formal regions share a similar definition, with formal regions being “a group of places that have similar conditions". Even in formal regions, it is true that no region is completely homogeneous, as characteristics vary from place to place. While regions all share at least one common trait, it is true that they can have multiple traits that unite them, an example being a region that shares a language and a government.

== History ==
The five themes of geography were published in the 1984 Guidelines for Geographic Education: Elementary and Secondary Schools by the National Council for Geographic Education/Association of American Geographers Joint Committee on Geographic Education. The document was 28 pages, and suggested the themes as a way for teachers to organize content for geography classes. The committee included Salvatore J. Natoli, Richard G. Boehm, James B. Kracht, David A. Lanegran, Janice J. Monk, and Robert W. Morrill. They settled on five themes: location, place, relationships within places (later changed to human-environment interaction), relationships between places (later shortened to movement), and region. The themes were not a "new geography" but rather a conceptual structure for organizing information about geography.

The themes became widespread in American social science education and were used for teacher training by the National Geographic Society's statewide alliances. They also played a role in reestablishing geography in school curricula. When the National Geography Standards were released in 1994, people compared them to the five themes, saying that the themes had a simplicity that the new standards were lacking.

In 1992, a National Assessment of Educational Progress consensus group said that the five themes are useful for teaching, but that for assessment, geography should be divided into the three topics of "space and place", "environment and society", and "spatial dynamic and connections".

The five themes continue to be used as an educational approach in many educational outlets. As of 2012, they are included in the National Council for the Social Studies elementary school standards and in state social studies standards.

== Current Usage ==
The five themes continue to be used as an educational approach in many educational outlets. As of 2012, they are included in the National Council for the Social Studies elementary school standards and in state social studies standards. The influence of the five themes can still be found in many standards, such as the National Council for the Social Studies (NCSS) Standards for elementary grades. With the increase of emphasis placed on standardized testing in the United States, social studies, and thus geography, is receiving less time in elementary classrooms.
