= Geography of Georgia (country) =

- Continent: Europe and Asia
- Region: Caucasus
- Coordinates: 42°00′N 43°30′E
- Area: Ranked 119
  - Total: 69,700 km^{2} (26,900 sq mi)
  - Land: 100%
  - Water: 0%
- Coastline: 310 km (190 mi)
- Borders: 1,814 km (1,127 mi): Russia (894 km); Turkey (273 km); Armenia (219 km); Azerbaijan (428 km)
- Highest point: Mount Shkhara 5,201 m (17,064 ft)
- Lowest point: Between Poti and Kulevi, (-1.5-2.3 m)
- Longest river: Alazani River 407 km (253 mi)
- Largest lake: Paravani Lake, 37.5 km^{2} (14.5 sq mi)
- Climate: Temperate to subtropical
- Terrain: Mountainous with a coastal plain
- Natural resources: timber, hydropower, manganese deposits, iron ore, copper, minor coal and petroleum deposits; coastal climate and soils allow for important tea and citrus growth
- Natural hazards: earthquakes
- Environmental issues: air and water pollution, soil pollution from toxic chemicals
- Exclusive economic zone: 21,946 km^{2} (8,473 sq mi)

Georgia is a country in the Caucasus region on the coast of the Black Sea. Sometimes considered a transcontinental country, it is located at the intersection of Eastern Europe and West Asia, and is today generally regarded as part of Europe. It is bordered to the north and northeast by Russia, to the south by Turkey and Armenia, and to the southeast by Azerbaijan.

== Location ==
Georgia is largely surrounded by the Greater Caucasus and Lesser Caucasus mountains, which form part of a natural boundary between Eastern Europe and West Asia. Because the Europe–Asia boundary is essentially a "historical and cultural construct", Georgia's continental placement has varied greatly. Anaximander placed the boundary between Europe and Asia along the Phasis River (the modern Rioni River), which effectively located northern parts of Georgia in Europe and the south in Asia, a convention also followed by Herodotus. According to one 18th century definition, which set the Kuma–Manych Depression as the continental boundary, Georgia and the entire Caucasus fell into Asia. However, yet another definition drew the line at Aras River, effectively placing all of Georgia in Europe.

Notwithstanding variations in geographic placement, Georgia's proximity to the bulk of Europe, combined with various historical, cultural and political forces, has led to its inclusion in Europe. The country has joined European organizations, such as the Council of Europe and Eurocontrol, and was deemed eligible to apply for membership of the European Union, which it did in 2022 and was recognized as a candidate member state.

== Topography ==
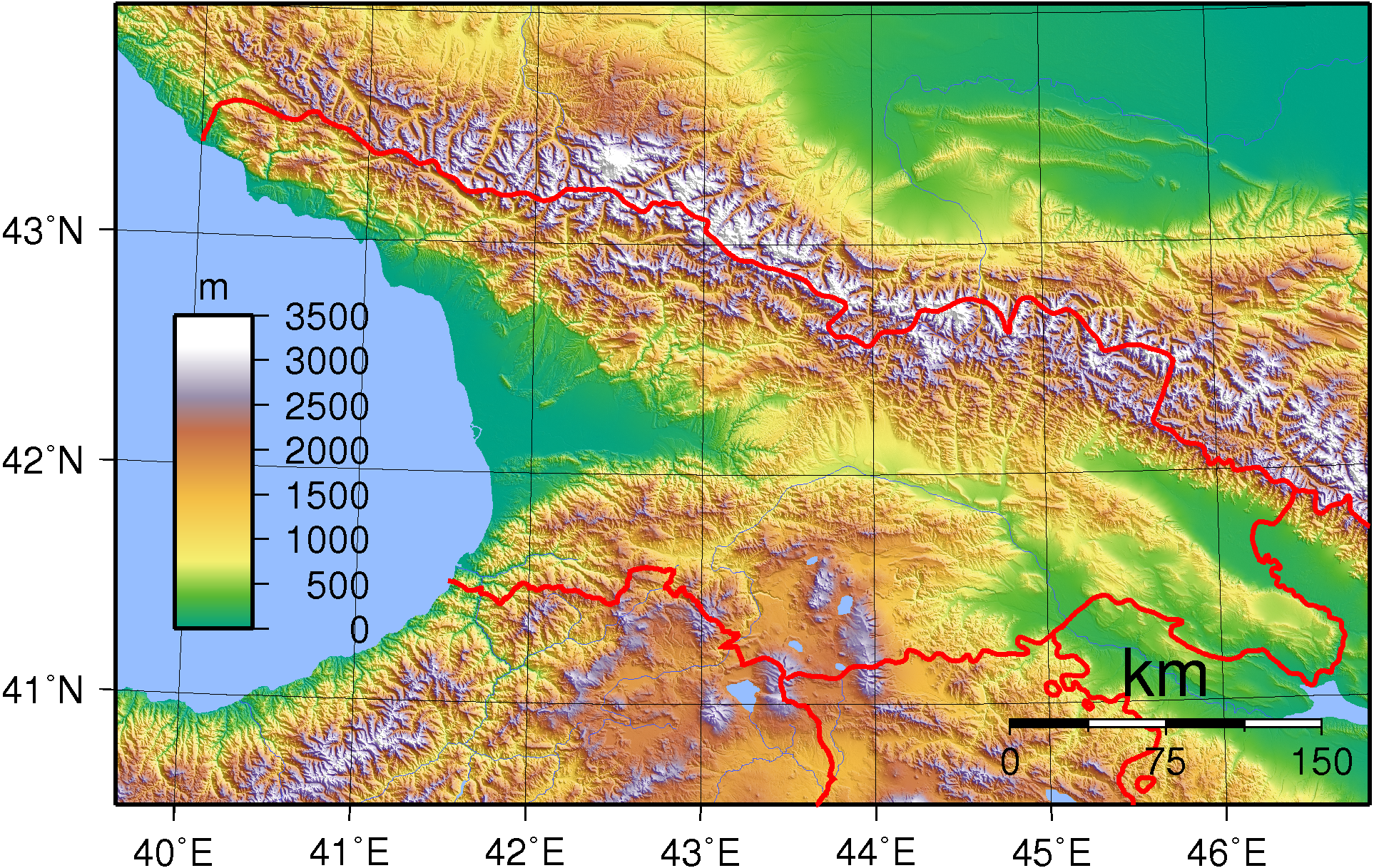
Topography of Georgia

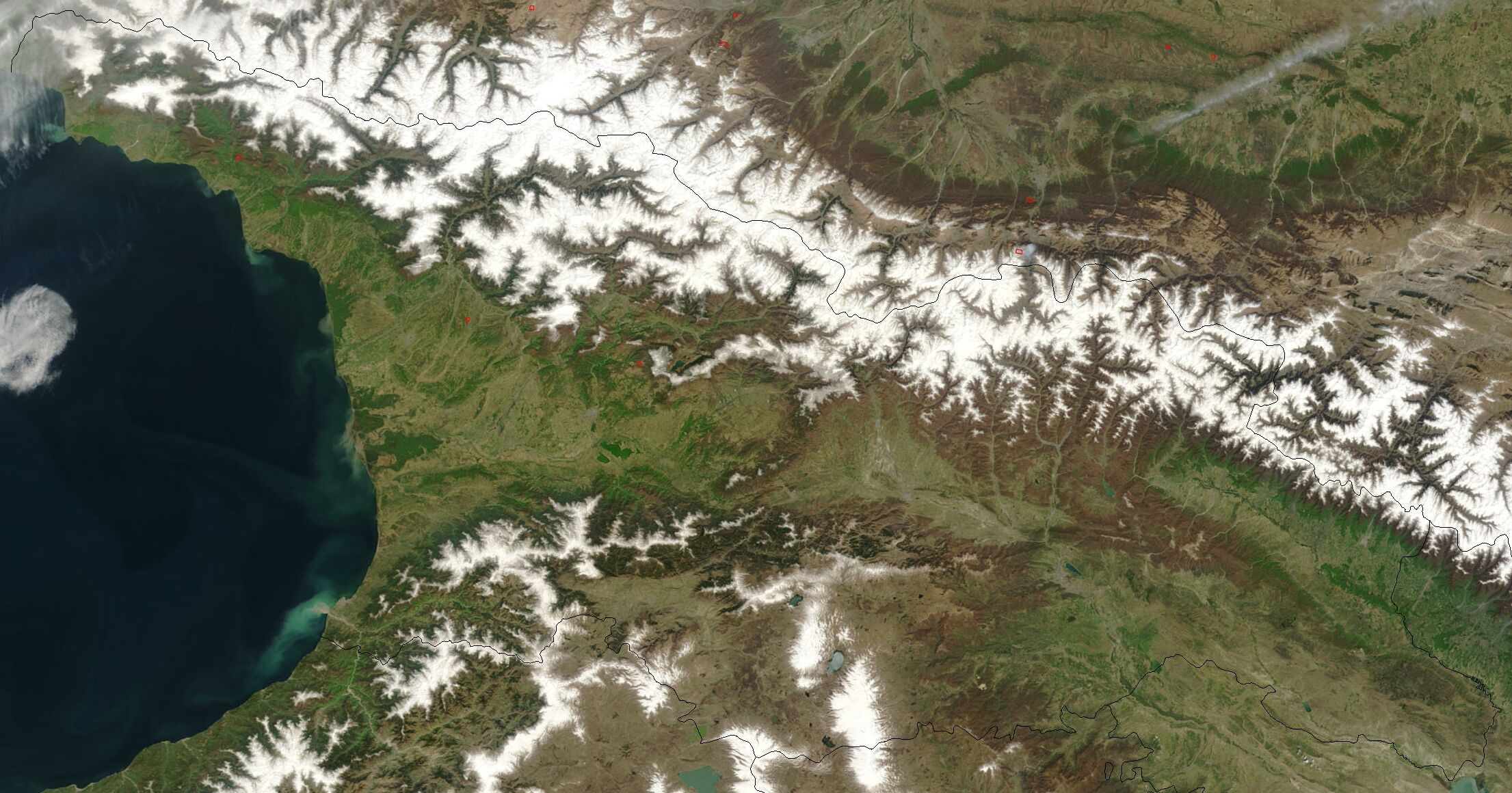
Satellite image of Georgia in late spring

Despite its small area, Georgia has one of the most varied topographies of the former Soviet republics. It is one of the most mountainous countries in Europe, lying mostly in the Caucasus Mountains, with its northern boundary partly defined by the Greater Caucasus range. The Lesser Caucasus range, which runs parallel to the Turkish and Armenian borders, and the Surami Range, which connects the Greater Caucasus and the Lesser Caucasus, create natural barriers that are partly responsible for cultural and linguistic differences among regions. Because of their elevation and a poorly developed transportation infrastructure, many mountain villages are virtually isolated from the outside world during the winter. Earthquakes and landslides in mountainous areas present a significant threat to life and property. Among the most recent natural disasters were massive rock- and mudslides in Ajaria in 1989 that displaced thousands in southwestern Georgia, and two earthquakes in 1991 that destroyed several villages in Racha, upper Imereti and the Tskhinvali Region (South Ossetia).

Georgia has about 25,000 rivers, many of which power small hydroelectric stations. Drainage is into the Black Sea to the west and through Azerbaijan to the Caspian Sea to the east. The largest river is the Kura River, which flows 1,364 km from northeast Turkey across the plains of eastern Georgia, through the capital, Tbilisi, and into the Caspian Sea. The Rioni River, the largest river in western Georgia, rises in the Greater Caucasus and empties into the Black Sea at the port of Poti. Soviet engineers turned the river lowlands along the Black Sea coast into prime subtropical agricultural land, embanked and straightened many stretches of river, and built an extensive system of canals. Deep mountain gorges form topographical belts within the Greater Caucasus.

== Coastline ==
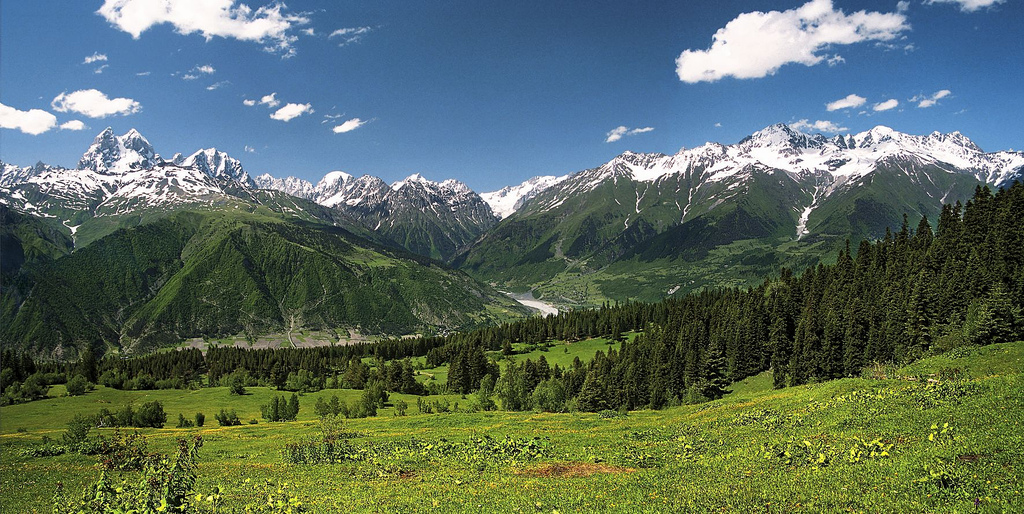
Svaneti region, northwestern Georgia

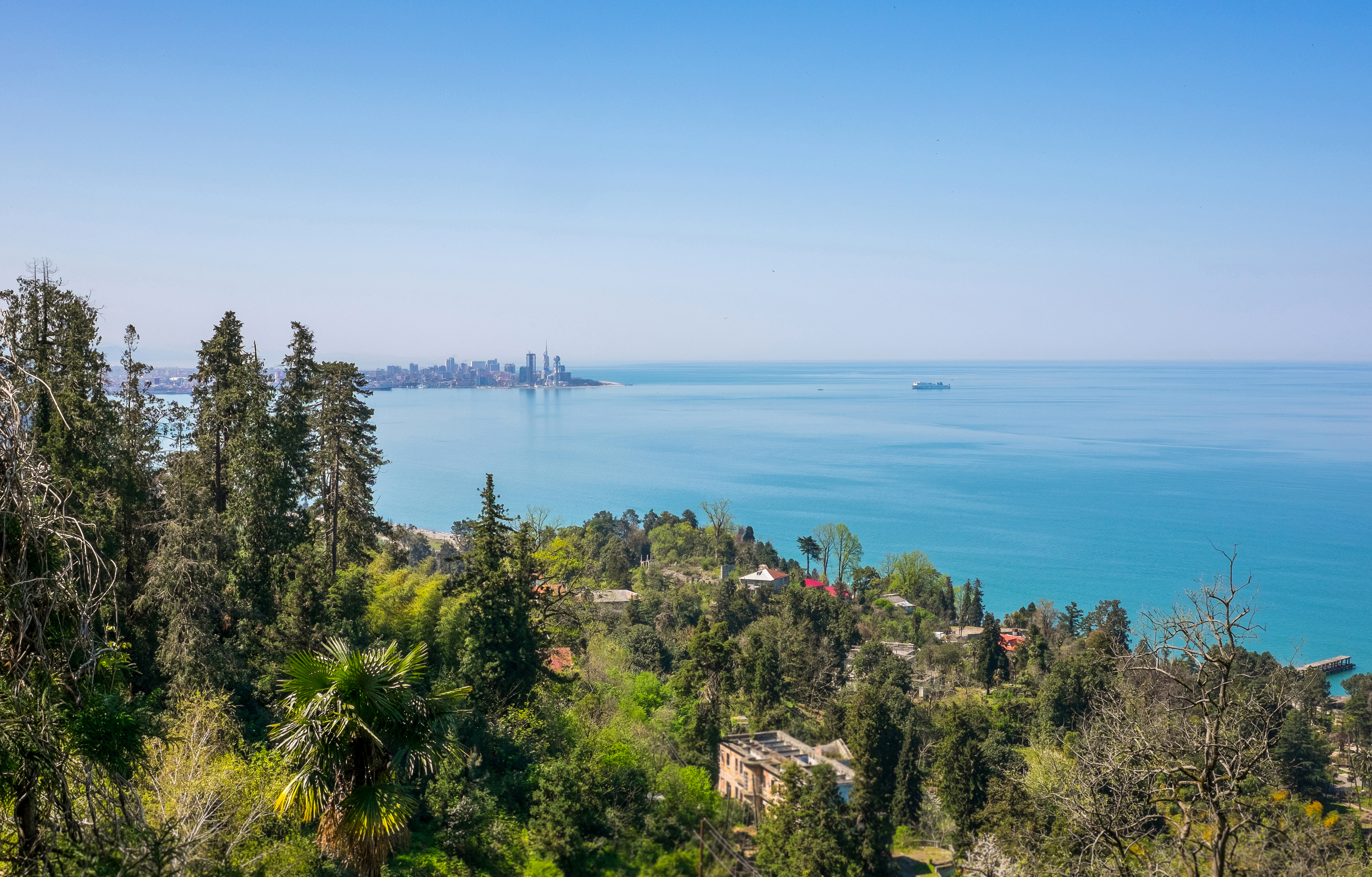
Black Sea coast of western Georgia, with the skyline of Batumi on the horizon.

The coastline of Georgia about 315 kilometres (196 mi): of the coastline, 57 kilometres (35 mi) is the coastline of Ajaria (Ajara) and 200 kilometres (120 mi) is the coastline of Abkhazia. Georgia has an Exclusive Economic Zone of 21,946 km^{2} (8,473 sq mi) in the Black Sea.

== Climate ==
Köppen climate classification regions.

Georgia's climate is affected by temperate humid influences from the west and continental influences from the east. The Greater Caucasus range moderates local climate by serving as a barrier against cold air from the north. Warm, moist air from the Black Sea moves easily into the coastal lowlands from the west. Climatic zones are determined by distance from the Black Sea and by altitude. Along the Black Sea coast, from Abkhazia to the Turkish border, and in the region known as the Colchis Lowland inland from the coast, the dominant subtropical climate features high humidity and heavy precipitation (1,000 to 2,000 mm or 39.4 to 78.7 in per year; the Black Sea port of Batumi receives 2,500 mm or 98.4 in per year). Several varieties of palm trees and citrus grow in these regions, where the midwinter average temperature is 5 °C (41 °F) and the midsummer average is 22 °C (71.6 °F).

The plains of eastern Georgia are shielded from the influence of the Black Sea by mountains that provide a more continental climate. Summer temperatures average 20 to 24 °C (68.0 to 75.2 °F), winter temperatures 2 to 4 °C (35.6 to 39.2 °F). Humidity is lower, and rainfall averages 500 to 800 mm (19.7 to 31.5 in) per year. Alpine and highland regions in the east and west, as well as a semi-arid region on the Iori Plateau to the southeast, have distinct microclimates.

At higher elevations, precipitation is sometimes twice as heavy as in the eastern plains. In the west, the climate is subtropical to about 650 m (2,133 ft); above that altitude (and to the north and east) is a band of moist and moderately warm weather, then a band of cool and wet conditions. Alpine conditions begin at about 2,100 m (6,890 ft), and above 3,600 m (11,811 ft) snow and ice are present year-round.

Climate data for Tbilisi (1991–2020 normals, extremes 1881–present)
Month	Jan	Feb	Mar	Apr	May	Jun	Jul	Aug	Sep	Oct	Nov	Dec	Year
Record high °C (°F)	19.5 (67.1)	22.4 (72.3)	28.9 (84.0)	34.4 (93.9)	35.1 (95.2)	40.2 (104.4)	42.0 (107.6)	40.4 (104.7)	37.9 (100.2)	33.3 (91.9)	27.2 (81.0)	22.8 (73.0)	42.0 (107.6)
Mean daily maximum °C (°F)	6.6 (43.9)	7.7 (45.9)	12.6 (54.7)	18.9 (66.0)	23.1 (73.6)	28.1 (82.6)	31.2 (88.2)	30.9 (87.6)	26.4 (79.5)	19.8 (67.6)	12.8 (55.0)	8.4 (47.1)	18.9 (66.0)
Daily mean °C (°F)	2.3 (36.1)	3.1 (37.6)	7.2 (45.0)	12.7 (54.9)	17.2 (63.0)	21.7 (71.1)	24.9 (76.8)	24.7 (76.5)	20.2 (68.4)	14.2 (57.6)	7.9 (46.2)	3.7 (38.7)	13.3 (55.9)
Mean daily minimum °C (°F)	−0.8 (30.6)	0.0 (32.0)	3.2 (37.8)	8.4 (47.1)	12.4 (54.3)	16.5 (61.7)	19.8 (67.6)	19.5 (67.1)	15.4 (59.7)	10.4 (50.7)	4.9 (40.8)	1.3 (34.3)	9.3 (48.7)
Record low °C (°F)	−24.4 (−11.9)	−14.8 (5.4)	−12.8 (9.0)	−3.8 (25.2)	1.0 (33.8)	6.3 (43.3)	9.3 (48.7)	8.9 (48.0)	0.8 (33.4)	−6.4 (20.5)	−7.1 (19.2)	−20.5 (−4.9)	−24.4 (−11.9)
Average precipitation mm (inches)	21 (0.8)	23 (0.9)	29 (1.1)	51 (2.0)	92 (3.6)	85 (3.3)	49 (1.9)	37 (1.5)	27 (1.1)	41 (1.6)	29 (1.1)	23 (0.9)	507 (20.0)
Average rainy days	4	4	8	12	12	10	7	8	9	10	10	6	100
Average snowy days	6	8	3	0.1	0	0	0	0	0	0.1	1	4	22
Average relative humidity (%)	74	72	68	66	67	64	61	62	66	73	76	76	69
Mean monthly sunshine hours	99	102	142	171	213	249	256	248	206	164	103	93	2,046
Source 1: Pogoda.ru.net
Source 2: NOAA (Sunshine hours 1961–1990)

Climate data for Mta-Sabueti (1991-2020, extremes 1981-2020) 42°02′N 43°28′E
Month	Jan	Feb	Mar	Apr	May	Jun	Jul	Aug	Sep	Oct	Nov	Dec	Year
Record high °C (°F)	13.3 (55.9)	16.4 (61.5)	19.4 (66.9)	27.8 (82.0)	26.5 (79.7)	30.0 (86.0)	31.1 (88.0)	34.4 (93.9)	31.4 (88.5)	26.1 (79.0)	23.6 (74.5)	15.9 (60.6)	34.4 (93.9)
Mean daily maximum °C (°F)	0.3 (32.5)	1.0 (33.8)	5.1 (41.2)	11.2 (52.2)	16.0 (60.8)	19.5 (67.1)	22.1 (71.8)	23.1 (73.6)	18.8 (65.8)	13.4 (56.1)	6.7 (44.1)	2.0 (35.6)	11.6 (52.9)
Daily mean °C (°F)	−2.5 (27.5)	−2.3 (27.9)	0.9 (33.6)	5.9 (42.6)	10.8 (51.4)	14.4 (57.9)	17.0 (62.6)	17.7 (63.9)	13.7 (56.7)	8.9 (48.0)	3.2 (37.8)	−0.8 (30.6)	7.2 (45.0)
Mean daily minimum °C (°F)	−4.7 (23.5)	−4.8 (23.4)	−2.0 (28.4)	2.3 (36.1)	7.1 (44.8)	10.7 (51.3)	13.5 (56.3)	13.9 (57.0)	10.2 (50.4)	5.9 (42.6)	0.7 (33.3)	−3.0 (26.6)	4.2 (39.5)
Record low °C (°F)	−18.3 (−0.9)	−18.2 (−0.8)	−14.6 (5.7)	−11.8 (10.8)	−2.2 (28.0)	0.1 (32.2)	3.1 (37.6)	5.0 (41.0)	1.6 (34.9)	−5.2 (22.6)	−8.6 (16.5)	−13.4 (7.9)	−18.3 (−0.9)
Average precipitation mm (inches)	150.1 (5.91)	124.8 (4.91)	118.6 (4.67)	78.6 (3.09)	94.2 (3.71)	79.6 (3.13)	54.3 (2.14)	54.1 (2.13)	69.3 (2.73)	89.4 (3.52)	122.8 (4.83)	128.1 (5.04)	1,163.9 (45.81)
Average precipitation days (≥ 1.0 mm)	14.2	13.8	14.9	12.2	13.4	12.4	10.3	9.2	9.5	10.7	11.3	13.7	145.6
Average relative humidity (%)	88.7	88.7	86.6	82.3	84.5	86.6	86.2	83.7	85.8	87.9	87	88.2	86.4
Source: NCEI

== Environmental issues ==
Since the 1980s, Black Sea pollution has greatly harmed Georgia's tourist industry. Inadequate sewage treatment is the main cause of that condition. In Batumi, for example, only 18 percent of wastewater was treated before release into the sea as of the early 1990s. As of the early 1990s, an estimated 70 percent of surface water contained health-endangering bacteria to which Georgia's high rate of intestinal disease was attributed.

The war in Abkhazia did substantial damage to the ecological habitats unique to that region. In other respects, experts considered Georgia's environmental problems less serious than those of more industrialized former Soviet republics. Solving Georgia's environmental problems was not a high priority of the national government in the post-Soviet years, however; in 1993 the minister for protection of the environment resigned to protest this inactivity. In January 1994, the Cabinet of Ministers announced a new, interdepartmental environmental monitoring system to centralize separate programs under the direction of the Ministry of Protection of the Environment. The system would include a central environmental and information and research agency. The Green Party used its small contingent in the parliament to press environmental issues in 1993.

Georgia participates in a number of international environmental agreements. It is a party to: Air Pollution, Biodiversity, Climate Change, Climate Change-Kyoto Protocol, Desertification, Endangered Species, Hazardous Wastes, Law of the Sea, Ozone Layer Protection, Ship Pollution, and Wetlands.

== Extreme points ==
- Northernmost point: (de jure): Abkhazia
- Northernmost point (de facto): Mestia Municipality, Samegrelo-Zemo Svaneti
- Southernmost point: Dedoplistsqaro Municipality, Kakheti
- Westernmost point (de jure): Abkhazia
- Westernmost point (de facto): Adjara
- Easternmost point: Dedoplistsqaro Municipality, Kakheti (border with Azerbaijan)

== See also ==
- Glaciers of Georgia
- List of earthquakes in Georgia (country)
