= Cyber geography =

Mapping networks of broadband cables

Cyber geography is mapping the physical network of broadband cables.

== Background ==
While servers, routers, cables, and other physical equipment and infrastructure that enable the Internet can be located, the location of each of these hardware modules does not convey the nature of cyberspace. Cyber geography addresses the degree of complexity of this infrastructure. One of the earliest endeavors that investigated the "spatiality" of cyberspace was the research conducted by Martin Dodge at the University of Manchester between 1997 and 2004. Dodge identified "electronic places" that exist behind the computer screen as part of such geography. "Space" in this case is said to be produced or reproduced through social relations and that it is both geographic and cyber as well as a relational concept.

== See also ==
- Broadband universal service
- Mobile broadband
- Ultra-wideband
- Wireless broadband
