= Botchwey =

Botchwey is a family name. Notable people with the surname include:

- Kwesi Botchwey (1944–2022), Ghanaian academic and politician
- Nisha Botchwey, Jamaican-American academic administrator
- Shirley Ayorkor Botchwey (born 1963), Ghanaian politician
