= Geographers on Film =

Archival series of interviews with geographers

Production
- Producers: Maynard Weston Dow, and Nancy Freeman Dow

Geographers on Film is an archival collection and series of more than 550 filmed interviews with experts of the geographic scholar community. This is a 40 year long initiative.

== Production ==
The series was created as an historical and educational resource by geographer and professor emeritus Maynard Weston Dow (1929 - 2011) of Plymouth State University, and his wife, Nancy Freeman Dow. The series was supported in part by the American Association of Geographers, the National Science Foundation, Plymouth State University, and the Marion and Jasper Whiting Foundation, of Boston. It has been ongoing for 40 years.

== Synopsis ==
The series "highlights leading voices that transformed the discipline of cartography and geography in the 20th century in America."

A prếcis of the collection's point was penned by Maynard Weston Dow:

"August 1970 marked the origin of Geographers on Film (GOF). Participants speak for the record (varying from ten to eighty-nine minutes) that samples of the geographical experience are maintained on video; the ultimate concomitant goal is full transcription. The project resulted from teaching thought and methodology courses; students therein would pore over the writings of cognoscenti to acquire an appreciation for the genesis and development of geography as a field of learning. After considering the advantage of having Aristotle on film it was decided to secure in a permanent medium something of the more fertile minds of modern geography. In the beginning concentration was on elder statespersons, thus coverage spans much of 20th Century geography."

The Library of Congress and the American Association of Geographers hold the films in their collections and have both preserved and digitized them. Initial work for digitization of the films and hosting them on a publicly accessible website was undertaken by a student at Plymouth State College in 1997 as part of her senior project in her Computer Science degree program, on which she collaborated with Dr. Dow. "Geographers on Film are a collection of recorded interviews conducted with hundreds of geographers from August 1970 until the mid-1980s." The National Gallery of the Spoken Word at Michigan State University has a copy, at least some of which is available on line. (Note: "Copies of the GOF collection are deposited in the National Gallery of the Spoken Word (NGSW) at Michigan State University. The Gallery facilitates worldwide utilization of GOF via digitization of the series by providing Internet access to the audio and selected video images. The NGSWis an expansive repository of aural resources, a NSF-funded online fully searchable database of significant spoken word collections.")

As a complement to Geographers on Film, "sixteen thematic video presentations have evolved" which include compilations from the larger oeuvre.

== 25 Archival Gems ==
Short clips from 25 of the interviews are available as a 35-minute, streaming video via the AAG website and YouTube. Geographers featured in this video include, in order of appearance:

- Carl O. Sauer
- John B. Leighly
- Jan O. M. Broek
- J. E. Spencer
- Fred B. Kniffen
- Clyde F. Kohn
- Richard Hartshorne
- Geoffrey J. Martin
- Preston E. James
- F. Webster McBryde
- Fred Lukermann
- Marvin W. Mikesell
- Melvin G. Marcus
- Hildegard Binder Johnson
- Arthur H. Robinson
- David G. Basile
- Edward B. Espenshade
- Wilbur Zelinsky
- Gilbert F. White
- Chauncy D. Harris
- Edward L. Ullman
- Homer Aschmann
- Jean Gottmann
- Richard J. Chorley
- Thomas Walter Freeman
