= Human settlement =

Places where people live and organize society

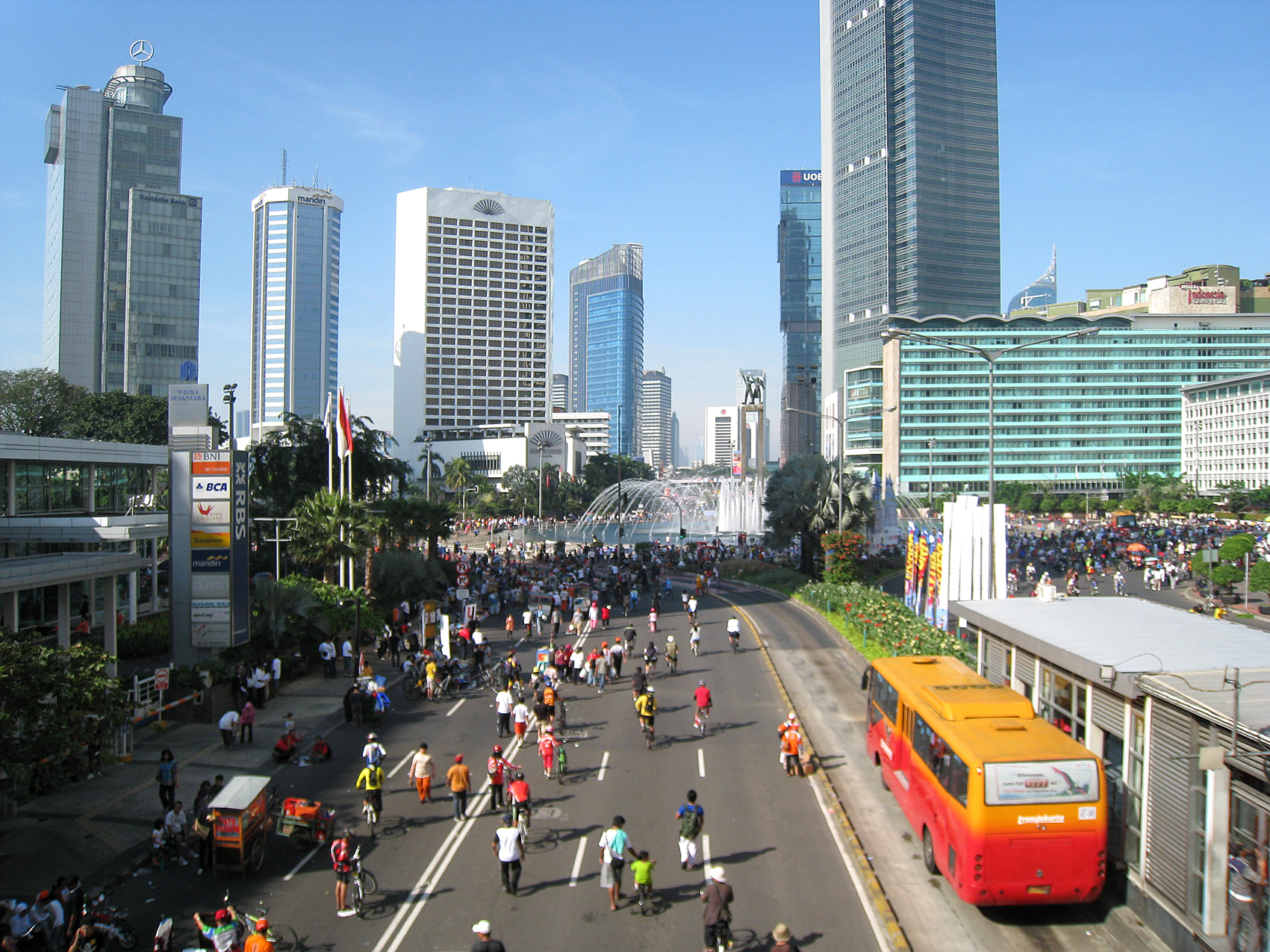
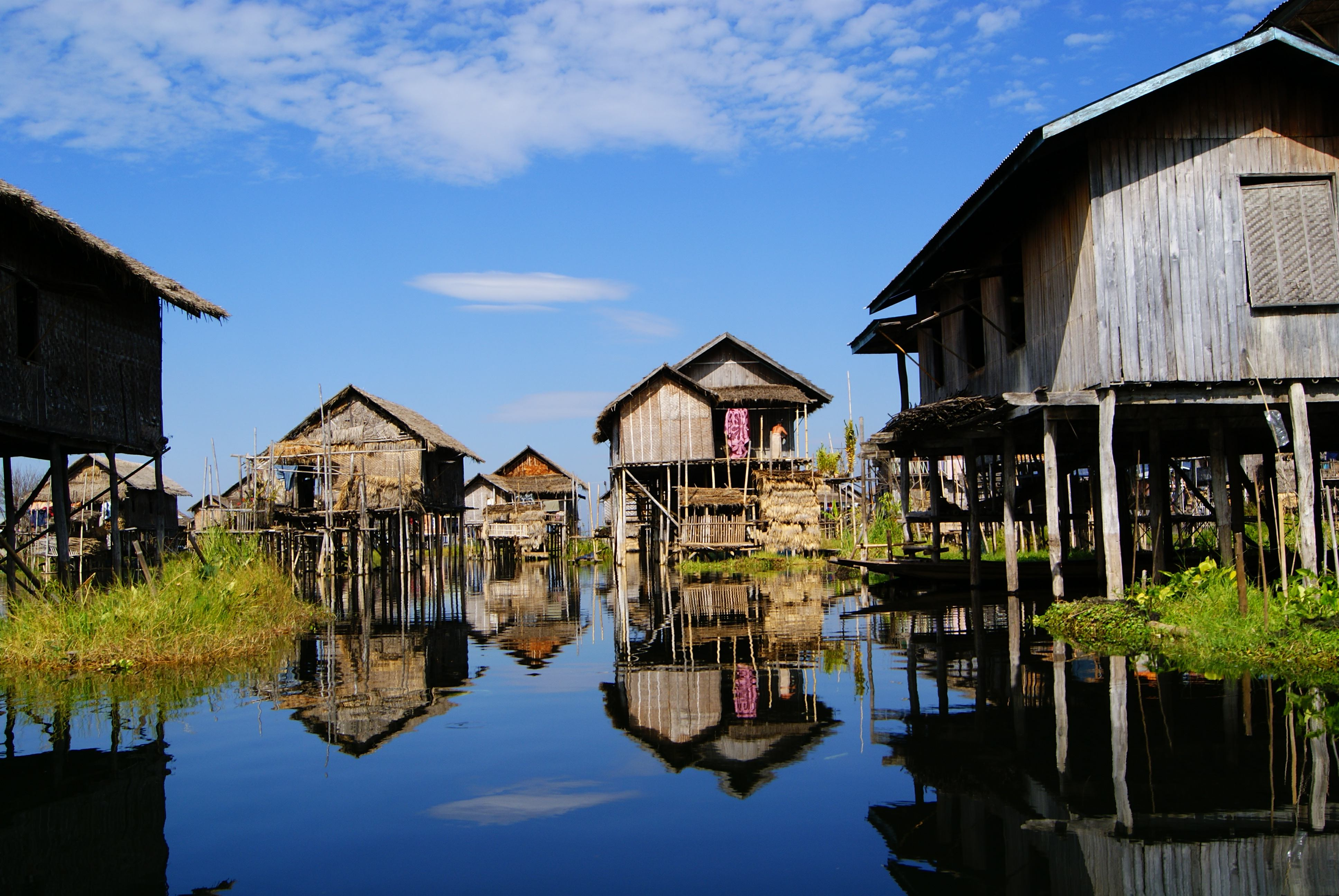
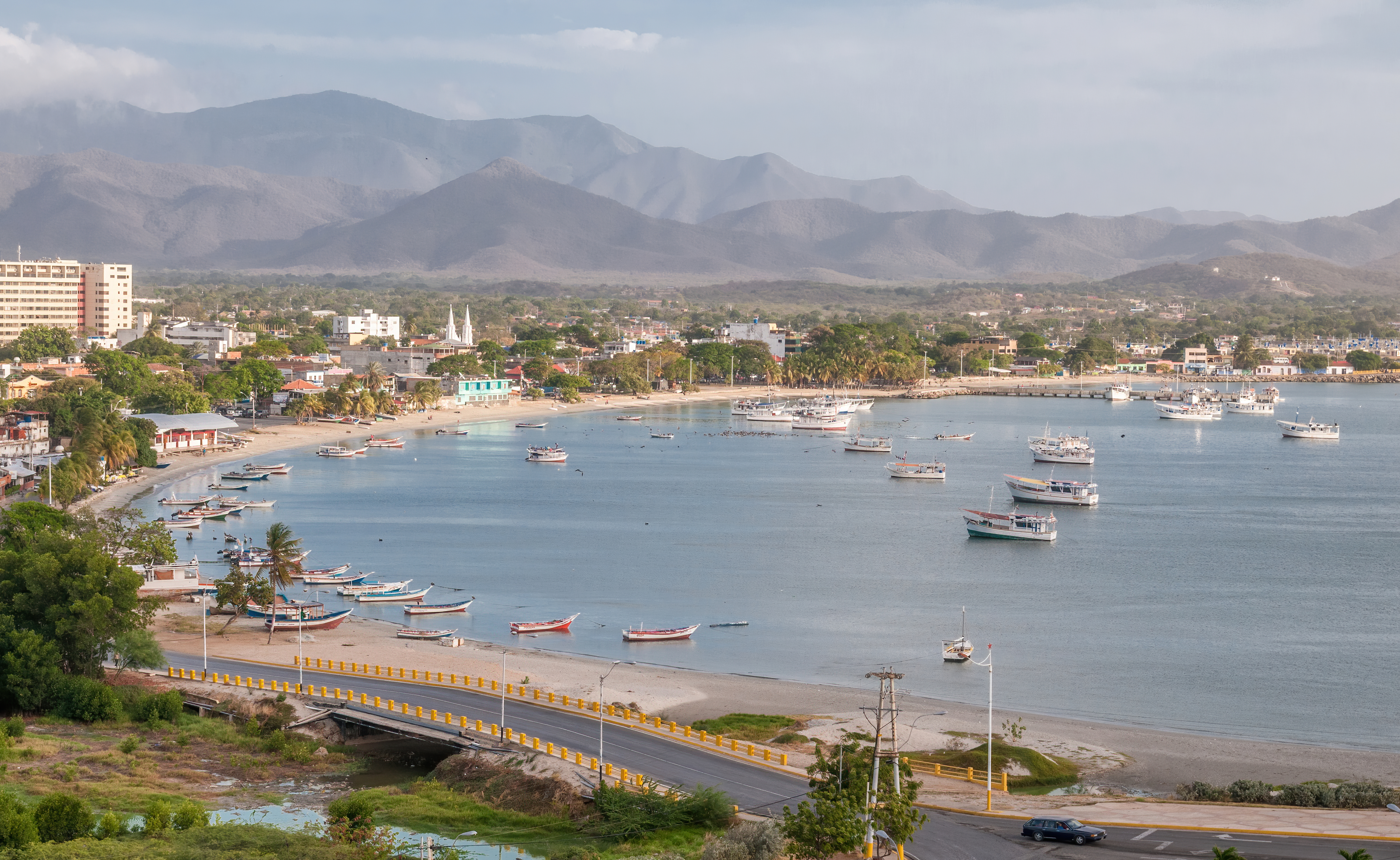
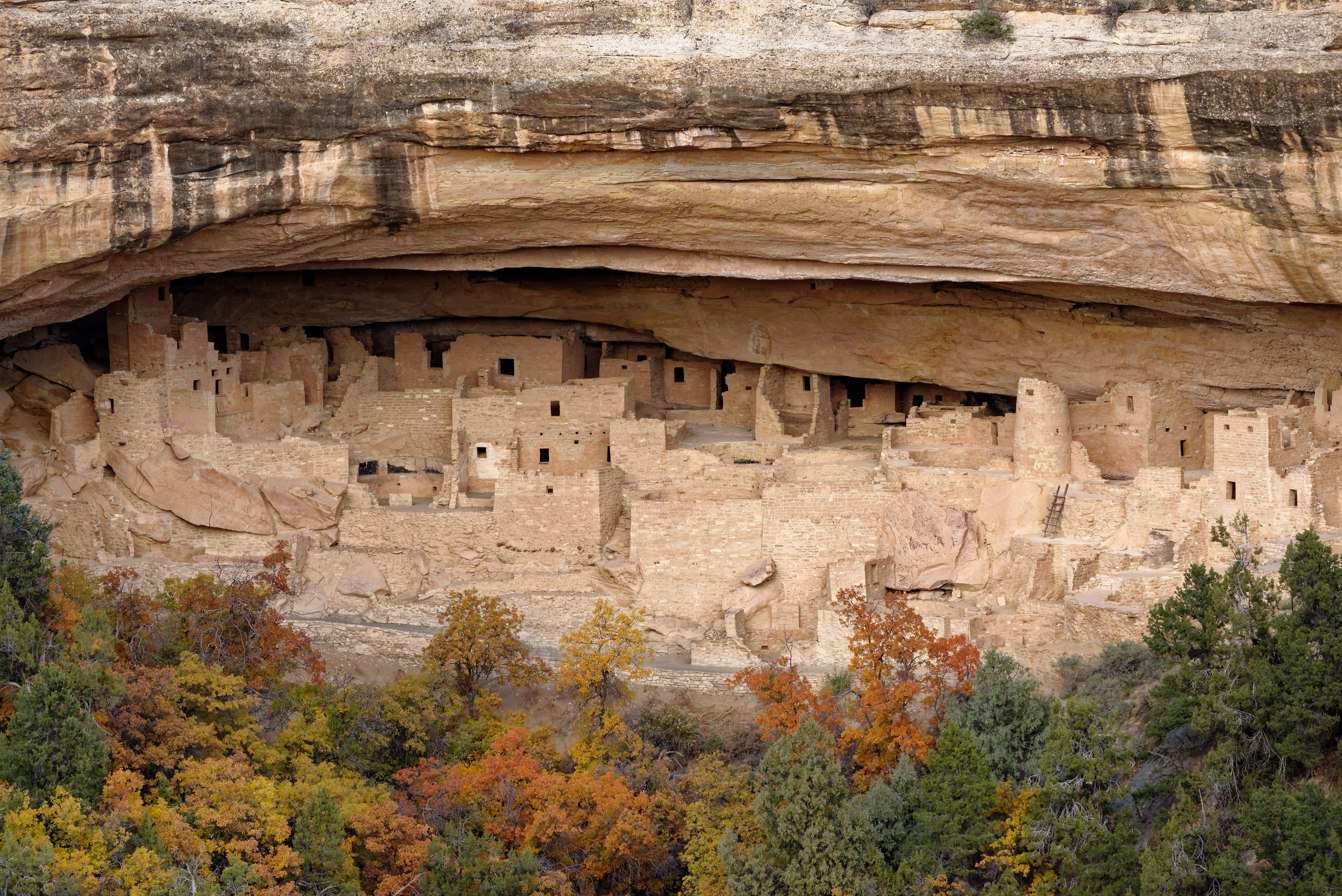
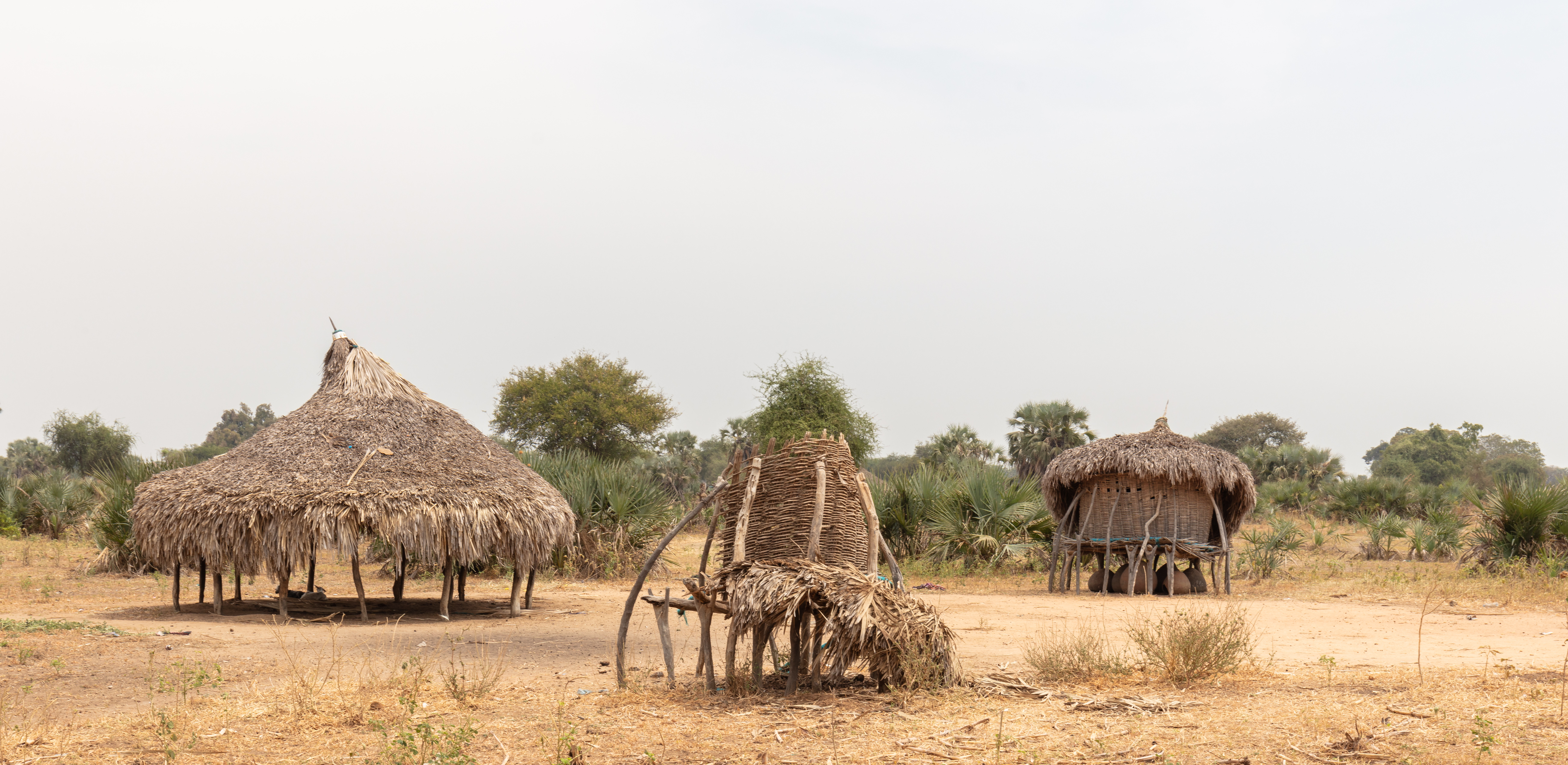
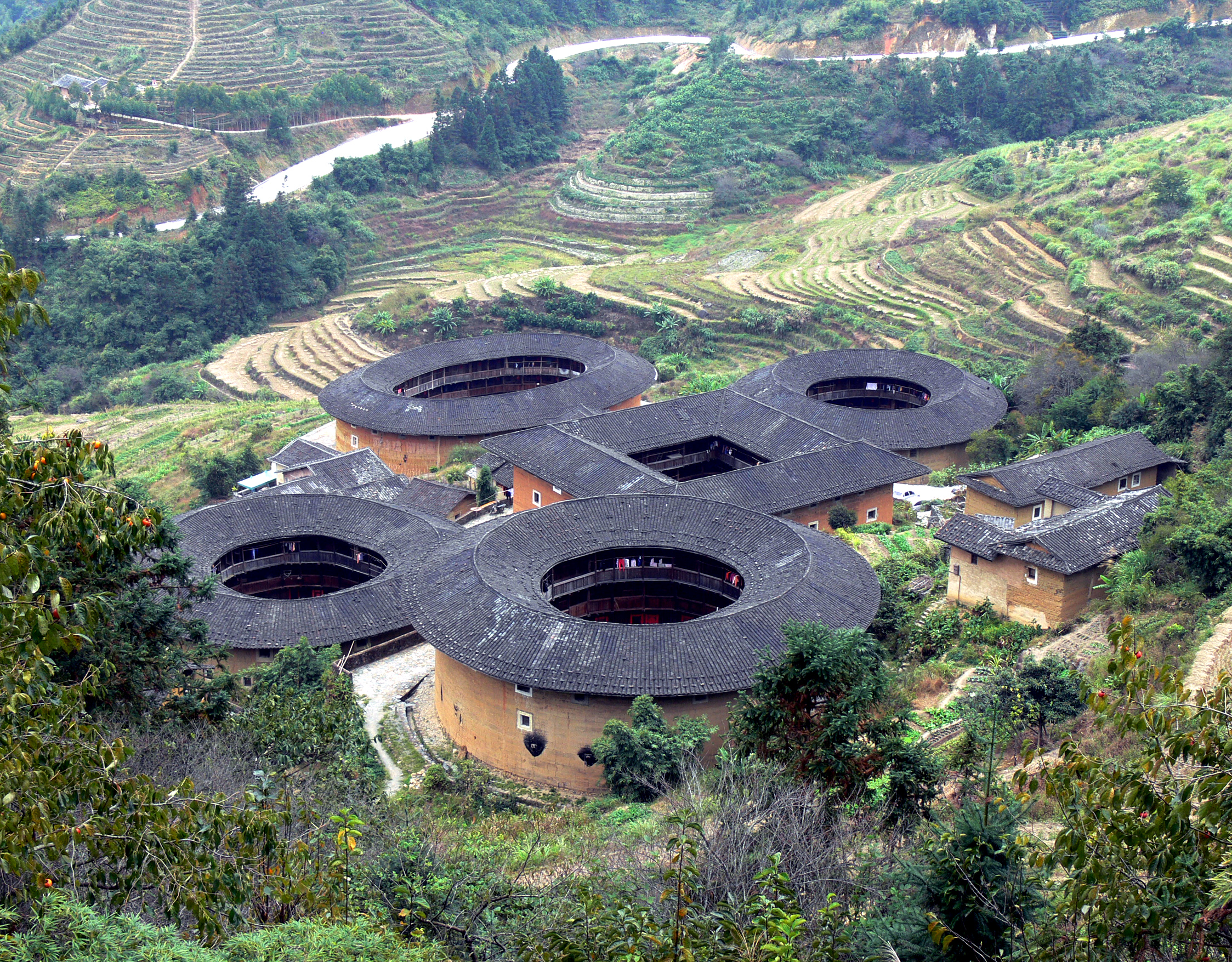
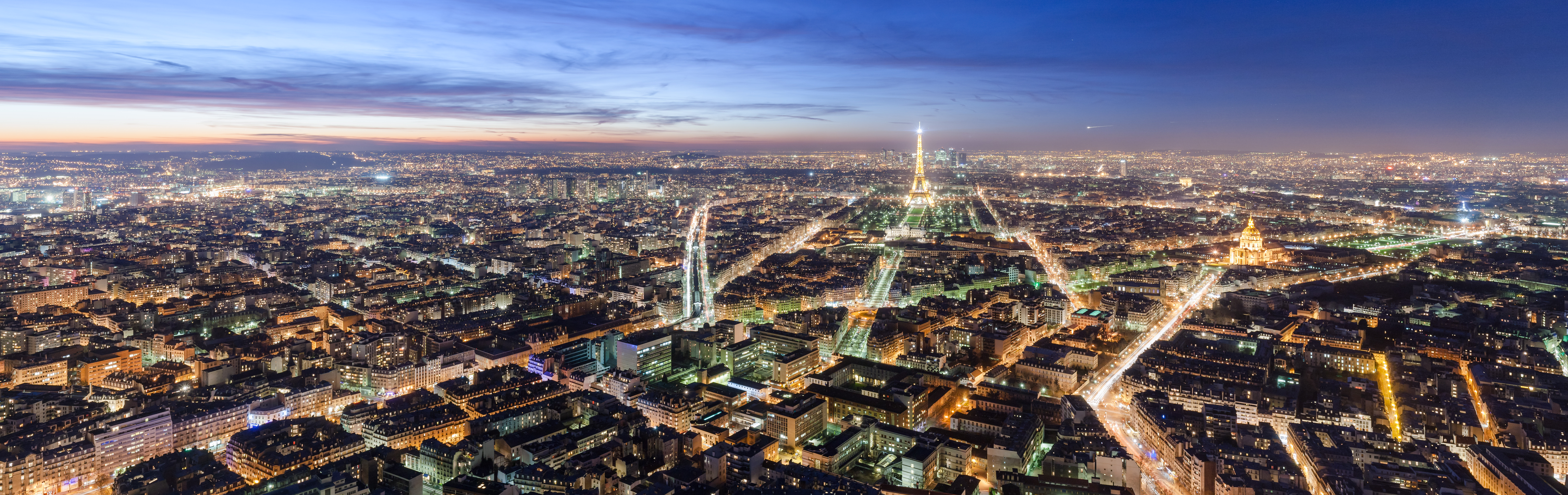
From top to bottom: Jakarta, Indonesia; Yawnghwe, Myanmar; Juan Griego, Venezuela; Ancestral Puebloan cliff dwelling, United States of America; Kworonit, South Sudan; Tianluokeng Tulou cluster, China; Paris, France

A human settlement, locality, or populated place is a place where people live and carry out social, economic, political, and cultural activities. The term encompasses a broad range of inhabited environments, including hamlets, villages, towns, cities, metropolitan regions, and larger settlement systems. Human settlements are created through human activity rather than natural processes and typically involve the construction of infrastructure and the modification of surrounding environments. They develop over long periods through the cumulative actions of many individuals and exist at scales ranging from individual dwellings to extensive urban regions.

Human settlement systems emerged relatively late in human history. For most of the existence of Homo sapiens, people lived in mobile hunter-gatherer groups rather than permanent communities. Permanent settlements developed independently in multiple regions between roughly 10,000 and 5,000 years ago during the transition from the Pleistocene to the Holocene. Some of these early settlements gradually increased in population and organizational complexity, giving rise to cities, more specialized economies, and formal systems of governance. Over subsequent millennia, settlements continued to expand in size and complexity, while industrialization accelerated urban growth and contributed to the emergence of large metropolitan areas and megacities.

Human settlements may be classified according to their function, scale, form, or administrative status. Major categories include urban, suburban, rural, and temporary settlements. Examples range from villages, towns, and cities to suburbs, exurbs, peri-urban areas, refugee camps, and post-disaster housing. Settlements may also be described according to their spatial arrangement, including nucleated, linear, dispersed, and isolated patterns. Systems of classification known as settlement hierarchies rank settlements according to their size and the range of services they provide, from homesteads and hamlets to conurbations, megacities, megalopolises, and the hypothetical ecumenopolis.

The study of human settlements includes a range of theories concerned with their distribution, structure, and development. Central place theory explains settlement patterns in terms of the provision of goods and services, while ekistics approaches settlements as part of a comprehensive system of human habitation. Other approaches include settlement scaling theory, which examines relationships between population size and settlement characteristics, rural settlement theory, and evolutionary models that describe settlements as interconnected systems that change over time. Human settlements are also a major subject of urban planning and sustainability research, and the study of settlement abandonment examines the factors associated with the decline and failure of communities.

== Definition and scope ==
A human settlement refers to spatial and operational arrangements created by humans to support life and organize activities across different scales. The term is used to describe a broad range of inhabited environments rather than a single type of place, including settlements of different sizes and levels of complexity. In common usage, the term includes both rural and urban settlements, ranging from small hamlets and villages to towns, cities, and metropolitan regions. Human settlements are defined by their origin in human action rather than natural processes, and involve the modification of surrounding environmental systems.

Human settlements form over time through the combined contributions of many individuals across generations, and their development occurs over extended periods rather than at a single point in time. They exist across multiple scales, from the space occupied by an individual to large, interconnected systems of settlements. These settlements also support the continuity of life and enable a range of human activities beyond basic survival. They are typically associated with permanent or semi-permanent habitation and the presence of built infrastructure.

== Historical development ==
=== Prehistoric origins and nomadic lifeways ===
Human settlement systems emerged relatively late in the history of Homo sapiens, who first appeared approximately 300,000 years ago. For the overwhelming majority of this period, human populations did not establish permanent settlements, but instead lived in mobile social groups adapted to environmental variability and resource distribution. During the Pleistocene epoch, early human cultures developed under climatic and ecological conditions that favored mobility. Additionally, social organization was structured primarily around hunting and gathering rather than sedentary residence, with subsistence strategies requiring flexibility and movement across landscapes.

Within these nomadic societies, key human capacities such as social cooperation, communication, and technological adaptation developed over extended periods, forming the basis for increasingly complex forms of social organization. These developments did not immediately lead to permanent settlements, but accumulated gradually as behavioral and cognitive traits that later supported sedentary lifeways and more permanent forms of habitation.

=== Emergence of permanent settlements ===
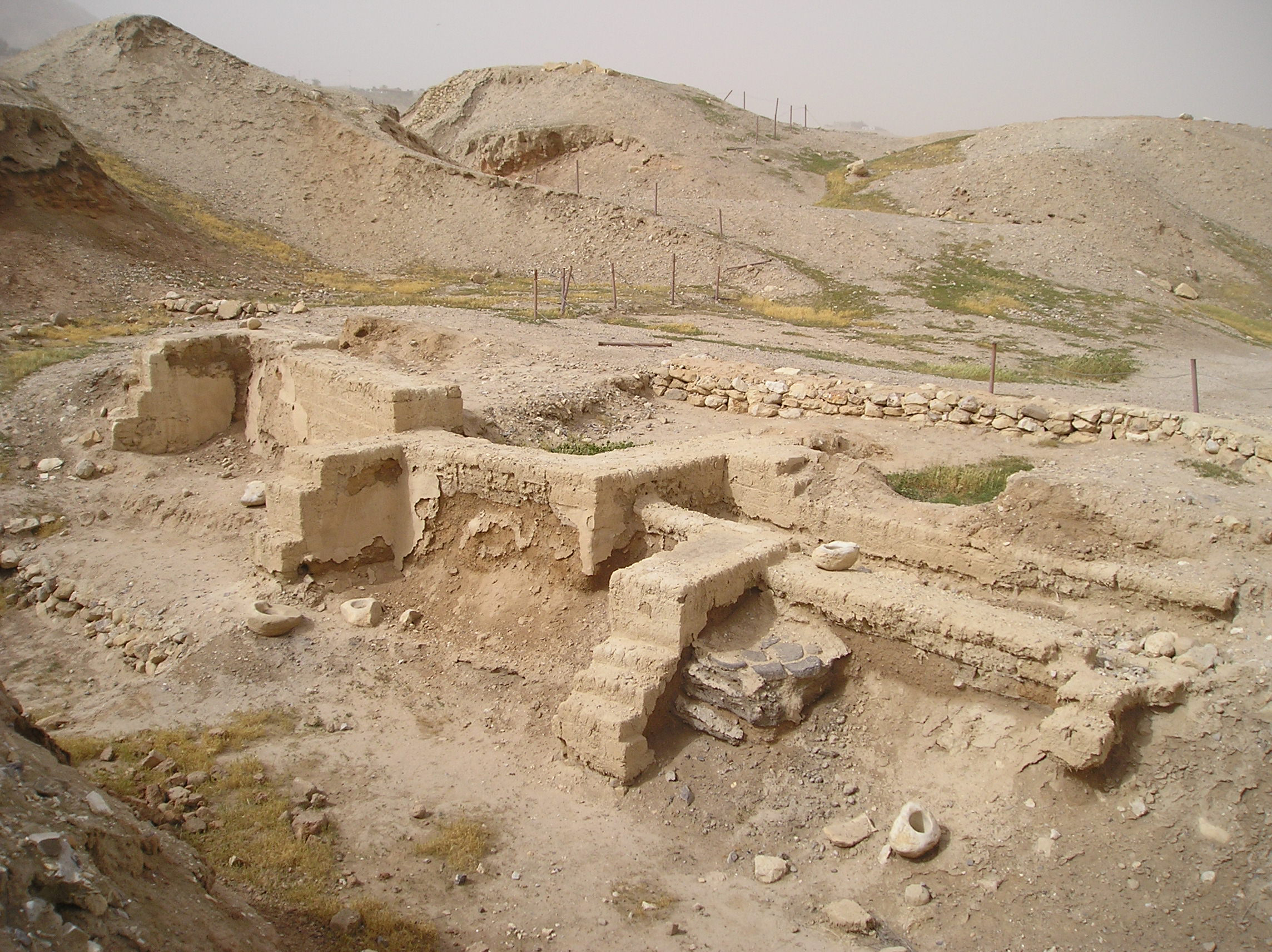
Tell es-Sultan, located in the Jordan Valley near modern Jericho, is recognized as the world's oldest fortified city, with origins dating back to the 9th–8th millennium BC.

Permanent settlements developed during the transition from the Pleistocene to the Holocene and were associated with changes in human ways of life and social organization. This shift occurred independently in multiple regions between approximately 10,000 to 5,000 years ago, indicating that settlement formation was not uniform across different environmental and cultural contexts. Early settlements were relatively small in scale and often took the form of modest hamlets. They were associated with gradual changes in subsistence strategies and increasing levels of social coordination, rather than abrupt or universal change. These early permanent communities established more stable patterns of residence and land use.

Because the emergence of settlements occurred relatively late in human history, it represents a small portion of the overall human timeline. The transition to sedentary life took place over extended periods rather than as a singular or uniform development. By approximately 7000 years ago, permanent settlements had been established in multiple regions, with associated increases in population density, more permanent resource management practices, and the development of more complex social and economic systems.

=== Development of early cities and complex societies ===
Over time, some settlements expanded in both population and organizational complexity, giving rise to early urban centers and more structured social systems, with increasing levels of coordination, resource management, and social differentiation. As settlements grew, so did the development of more permanent economic systems and institutional structures, including governance mechanisms required to manage larger and more complex populations, and a transition from small-scale communities to more organized urban societies. By approximately 5000 years ago, cities with substantial populations had emerged, along with more complex forms of social and economic organization and increasing concentration of population in defined locations.

Urbanization continued over subsequent millennia, with settlements reaching larger population thresholds and developing more complex institutional and administrative systems, including formalized governance structures used to coordinate activities and manage resources across expanding populations. These developments were associated with long-term increases in the scale and complexity of human settlements and the growing role of centralized authority in maintaining social organization.

=== Expansion, industrialization, and modern urban systems ===
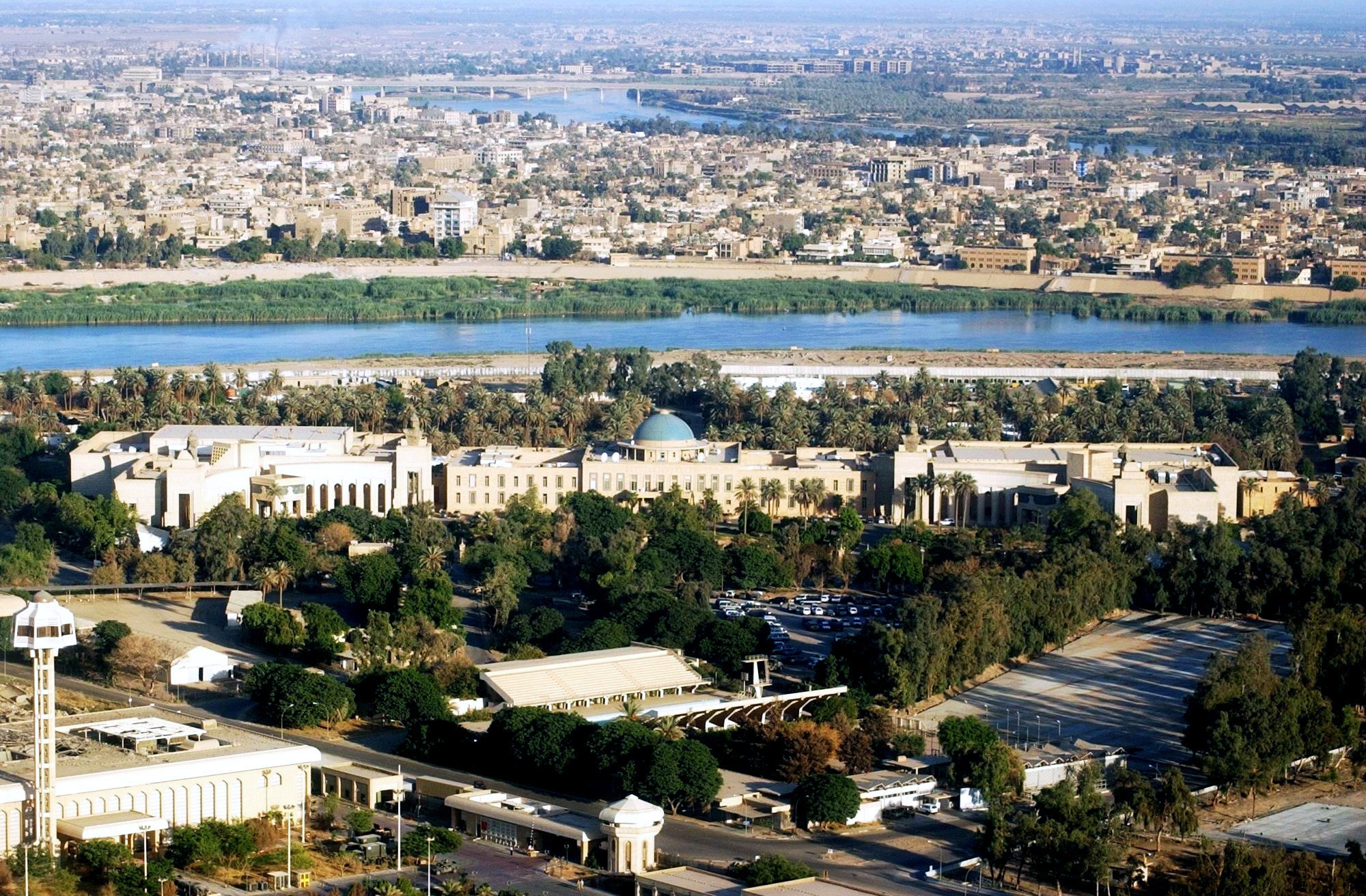
The first city to have exceeded 1,000,000 residents is thought to have been Baghdad by about 775 CE.

The scale and complexity of human settlements increased gradually over long periods but accelerated in the modern era, with a larger proportion of the global population living in permanent settlements and expansion in the size and density of urban centers, particularly in recent generations. These changes were associated with developments in economic organization, technological capacity, and resource use, as human societies became more interconnected and able to sustain large populations in concentrated areas.

By the medieval and early modern periods, some cities had reached populations in the hundreds of thousands or more, and in the modern period urban growth intensified with the emergence of large metropolitan areas and more complex urban systems. The development of megacities in the twentieth century continued this trend toward increasing scale and population concentration, supported by developments in infrastructure, transportation, and economic organization.

Industrialization contributed to this expansion by increasing productivity and enabling the large-scale processing and transportation of resources, which supported higher population densities and more complex settlement systems. At the same time, increases in the scale, intensity, and complexity of settlements were associated with greater environmental impacts, including higher demand for resources and changes to Earth's physical and biological systems, contributing to conditions associated with the Anthropocene.

== Settlement types ==
=== Urban ===
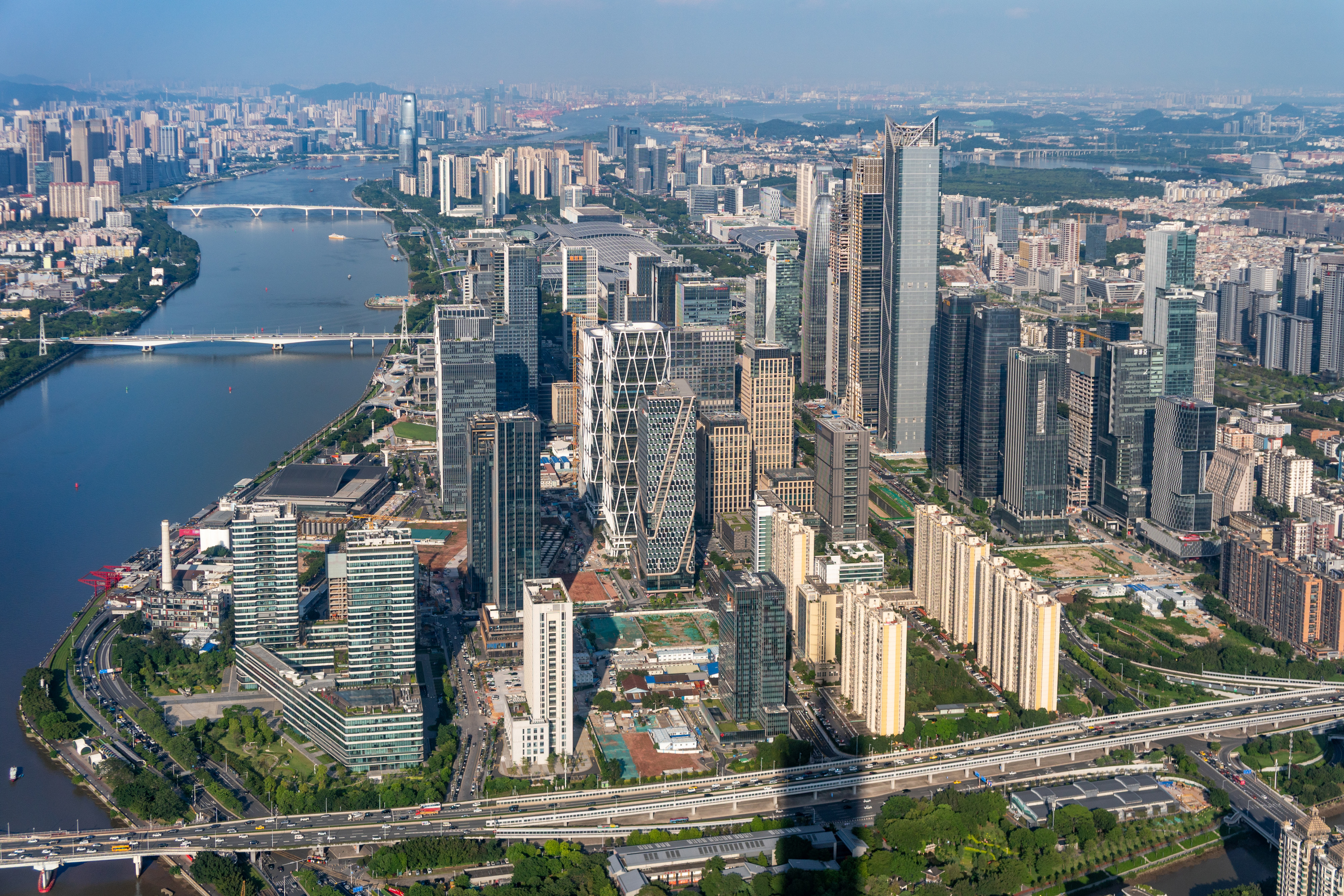
Pazhou West Area, Guangzhou, China, is part of the Guangzhou-Shenzhen urban area. Guangzhou-Shenzhen is the most populous urban area in the world, with 69,562,000 residents as of 2025.

Urban areas are geographic regions characterized by relatively high population density, extensive built environments, and concentrated social and economic activity. The term derives from the Latin urbs, which referred to the physical structure of a settlement, in contrast to civitas, denoting the associated social and political community. Defining what constitutes an urban area is complex, as human settlements vary widely in size, density, spatial organization, and function. Reliance on legal or administrative boundaries is often insufficient for this purpose, since such boundaries may encompass large areas of sparsely populated land or exclude densely settled communities that function as part of a broader urban system. As a result, formal jurisdictional definitions do not always correspond to the actual distribution of population and development on the ground.

Statistical definitions of urban areas therefore typically emphasize population size, density, and the continuity of built-up land rather than legal status. Many systems identify urban territory as contiguous zones of dense settlement, beginning with core areas that meet specified minimum density thresholds and extending to adjacent areas with somewhat lower densities that remain functionally integrated. These classifications may distinguish between larger urbanized areas and smaller urban clusters based on total population, while also recognizing additional settlements that meet minimum population criteria. In some analytical frameworks, settlement patterns are further described along a continuum that includes urban, suburban, and rural areas, reflecting variations in density and land use. In practice, however, the boundaries between these categories are often gradual, with transitional zones that combine characteristics of multiple settlement types.

==== Satellite city ====
Satellite cities are settlements with partial local autonomy in administration and services but strong economic and social dependence on a nearby metropolitan centre. They developed as part of urban planning strategies to manage metropolitan growth through decentralization, especially in response to mid-twentieth-century urban concentration. Typically linked to central cities by transport networks such as highways and railways, they enable regular commuting and functional integration. The concept was influenced by Ebenezer Howard's garden city ideas and later applied in post-war new town programs near major cities.

==== Urban sprawl ====
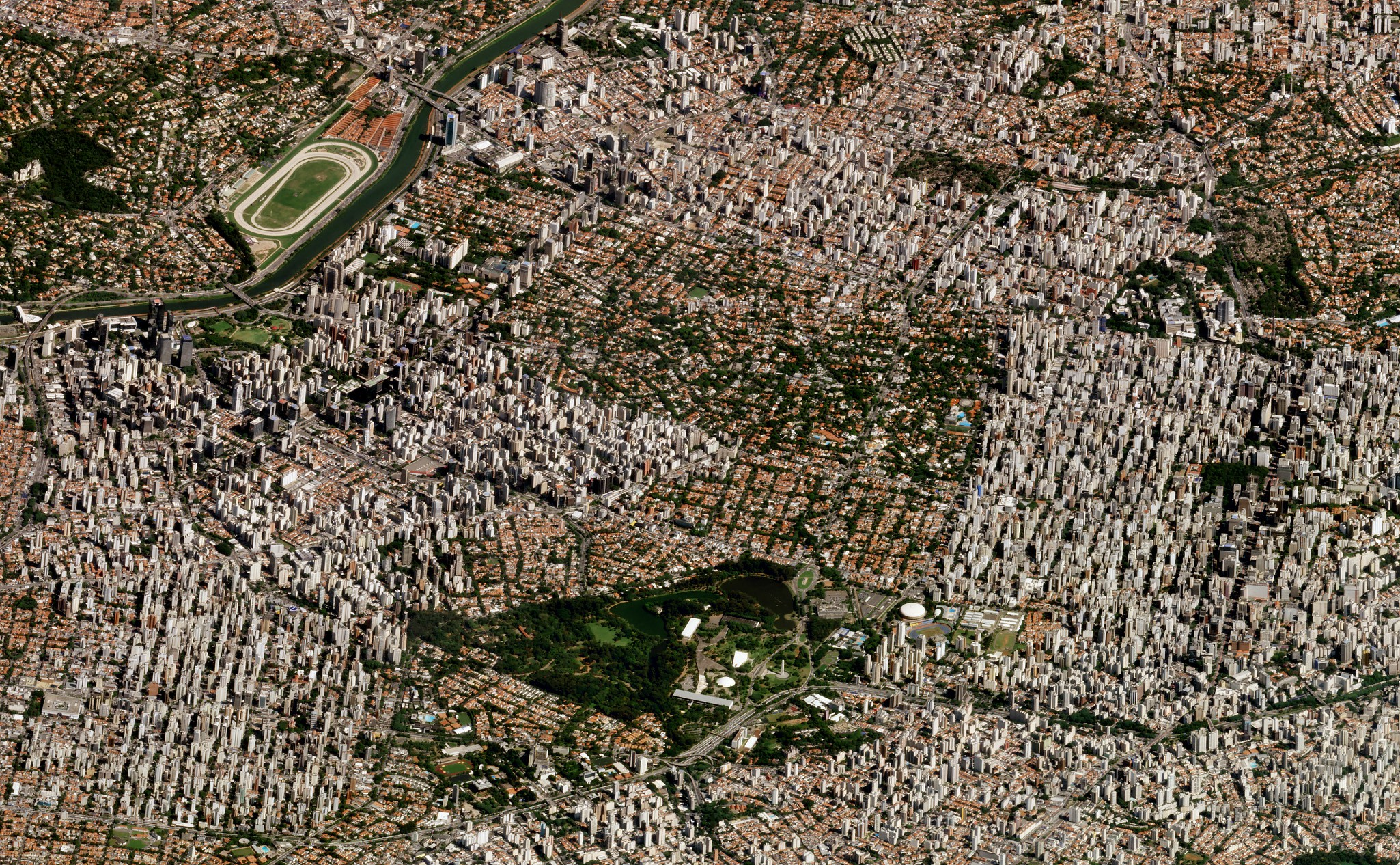
Urban sprawl in São Paulo, Brazil

Urban sprawl (or suburban sprawl) is the undue or uncontrolled spread of an urban settlement into surrounding rural land, historically occurring when population growth pushed development beyond existing urban limits. In the post-industrial era, it has been associated with incremental costs such as increased travel times, transport costs, pollution, and the loss of countryside, rather than a single clearly defined disadvantage. It is strongly linked to automobile-based development and the decline of public transport dependence, which encouraged dispersed, low-density growth. Sprawl is commonly characterized by loosely coordinated development with large areas of interspersed undeveloped land, and it has increasingly been viewed in planning discourse as inefficient and environmentally harmful, especially since the late twentieth century.

=== Suburban ===
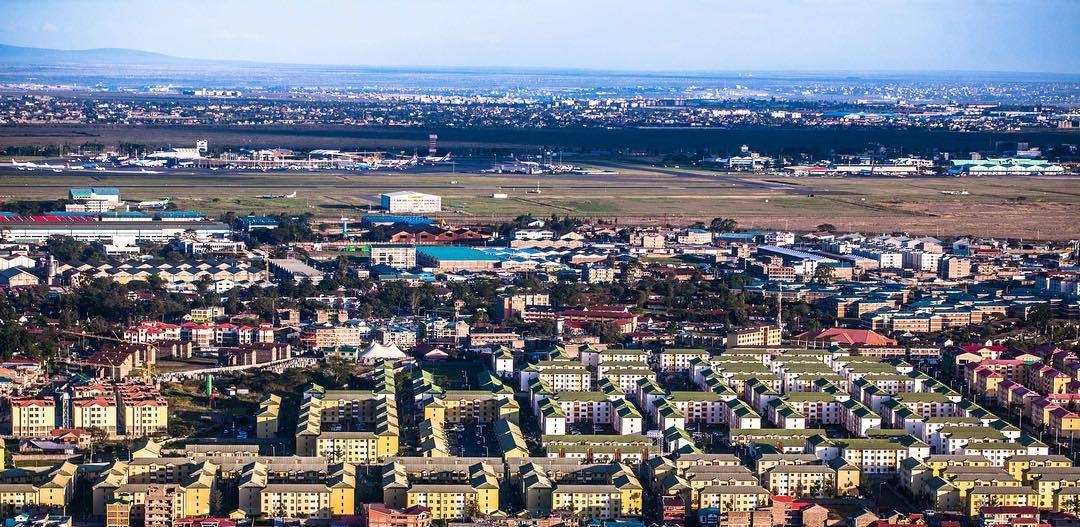
Suburban housing in southern Nairobi, Kenya. Jomo Kenyatta International Airport can be seen in the background.

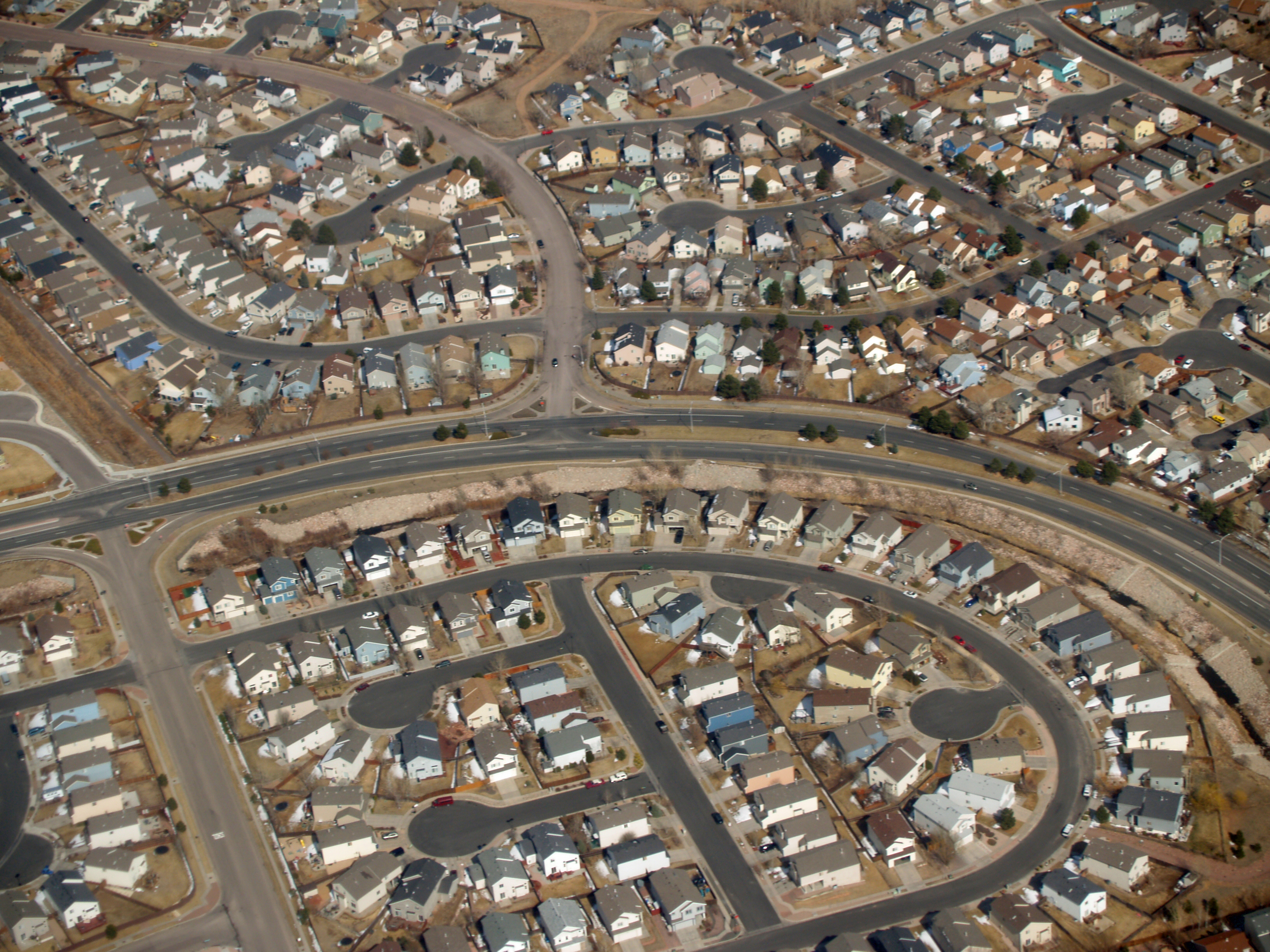
A suburban neighborhood of tract housing in Colorado Springs, Colorado; cul-de-sacs are hallmarks of suburban planning.

A suburb (or suburban area) is a residential zone within a metropolitan region that is typically located on the outskirts of a major city and closely connected to it through commuting patterns. Suburbs are generally less dense than central urban areas and are characterized by housing-oriented land use, though they may also include commercial districts, schools, and local services that support daily life. Their governance varies widely: in some countries they function as independent municipalities, while in others they are administratively integrated into the surrounding city or metropolitan authority.

The structure and definition of suburbs differ significantly across national contexts. In some regions, such as parts of Europe and Latin America, suburban areas are often incorporated into the continuous urban fabric of the main city or managed as part of broader metropolitan governance systems. In contrast, in countries like the United States, many suburbs remain legally separate municipalities within larger metropolitan regions, while additional layers such as counties help coordinate services. Similar suburban expansion patterns are also found in countries including India, China, Brazil, Canada, New Zealand, and South Africa, often driven by urban growth and outward city expansion. Areas beyond the suburbs are sometimes described as exurban zones, which are even lower in density but still economically tied to the urban core through commuting and regional infrastructure.

Suburban development expanded rapidly during the 19th and 20th centuries, closely linked to the rise of rail networks, road infrastructure, and later automobile dependence, which made daily commuting over longer distances practical. Suburbs tend to develop most extensively in regions with accessible surrounding land, particularly flat terrain that allows outward expansion. Over time, they have taken many forms, including planned residential communities, industrial suburbs, and satellite towns, all connected to larger urban economies through transportation and labor flows.

==== Exurban ====
Exurban development (left side) blends into suburban development (right side) in Loudoun County, Virginia, in the western part of the Baltimore–Washington metropolitan area.

An exurb is the low-density region beyond the suburbs but within the commuting zone of a metropolitan area, forming a transitional space between urban and rural environments. It is predominantly residential, characterized by dispersed development such as subdivisions, estates, mobile homes, and small businesses interspersed with farmland. Exurbs develop as a result of suburbanization and urban expansion, and may gradually evolve into suburbs over time. Their growth is closely associated with transportation infrastructure, particularly road networks, which enable longer-distance commuting. Migration to exurban areas is often linked to preferences for larger housing, lower costs, and greater open space. This outward expansion is typically accompanied by the decentralization of economic activity, increased commuting distances, greater reliance on automobiles, and associated effects such as traffic congestion and patterns of social stratification.

==== Peri-urban ====
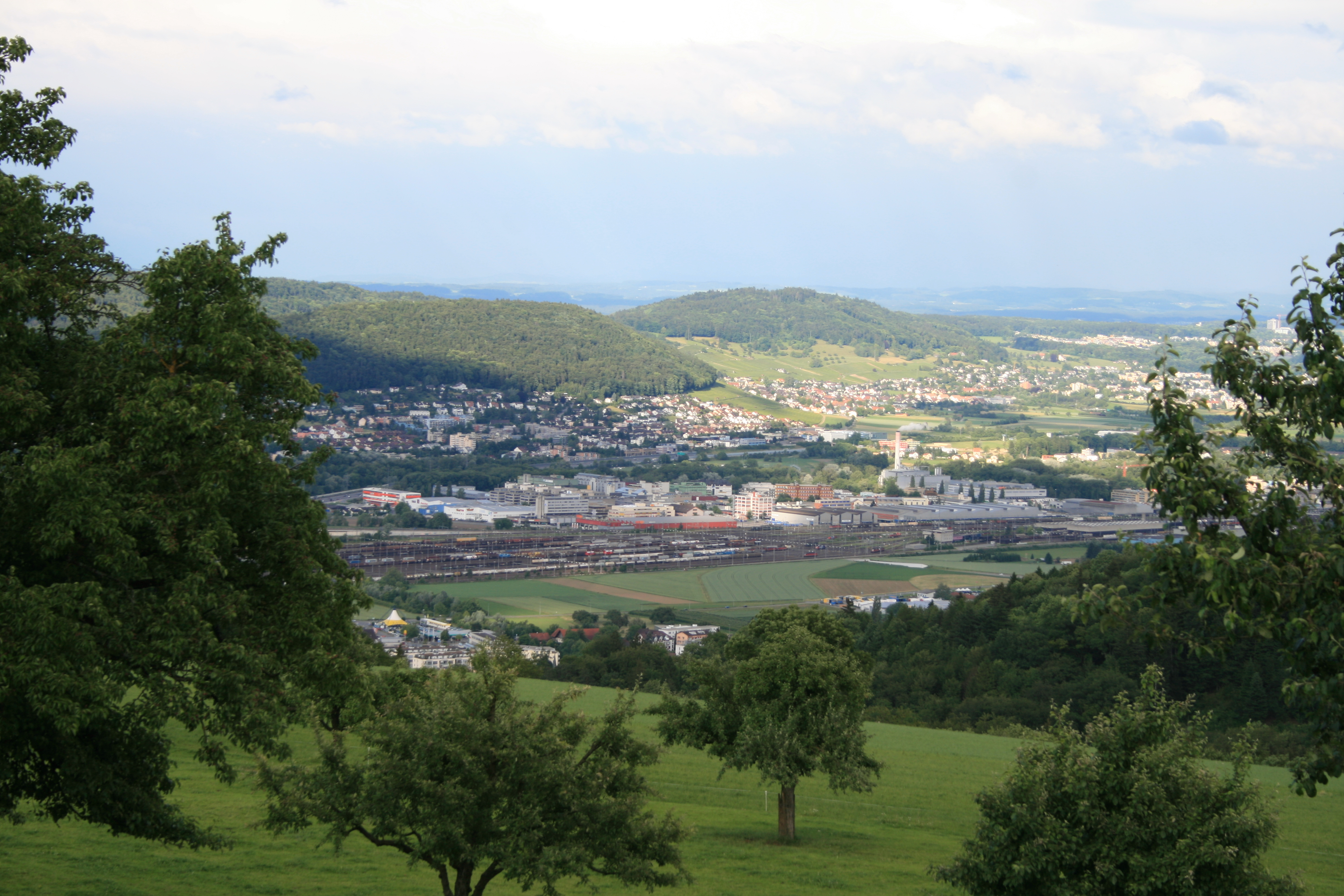
Mountain valleys of industrialized countries are often peri-urbanized. For example, the Swiss Limmat Valley, as shown here.

Peri-urban areas are transitional zones between urban centers and their rural hinterlands, formed through processes of rapid urbanization and urban sprawl, particularly in the Global South. These areas typically consist of formerly rural landscapes that have been transformed by the outward expansion of cities, resulting in fragmented patterns of land use, mixed economic activities, and shifting population densities. Peri-urban regions often depend on urban economies while continuing to rely on surrounding natural and agricultural resources, creating complex interactions between social, economic, and environmental systems. They are frequently characterized by limited planning and governance, contributing to uneven development and disparities in infrastructure, services, and environmental conditions. Definitions of peri-urban areas vary, but commonly include features such as discontinuous built development, lower-density settlements, and strong linkages to nearby urban centers through commuting and resource flows. In spatial planning, peri-urban zones are typically included within Functional Urban Areas, which encompass urban cores and their commuting zones, while the addition of surrounding rural hinterlands forms broader rural–urban regions. Significant concentrations of peri-urban land use are found in parts of Europe, particularly within the corridor between London, Paris, Milan, Munich, and Hamburg, as well as in rapidly expanding metropolitan regions worldwide.

==== Edge city ====
Edge cities are a form of contemporary urban development characterized by multiple, decentralized centers of employment, retail, and services located outside traditional downtown cores. Unlike older cities with dense, continuous central business districts, edge cities typically consist of dispersed clusters of low-rise buildings separated by open space, including parking areas, roads, and landscaped land. These areas function as new urban cores, containing a full range of city functions such as workplaces, shopping centers, and residential zones, but arranged in a spread-out pattern rather than a compact urban form. They are commonly linked by highways and other automobile-oriented infrastructure rather than traditional rail- or pedestrian-based systems.

=== Rural ===
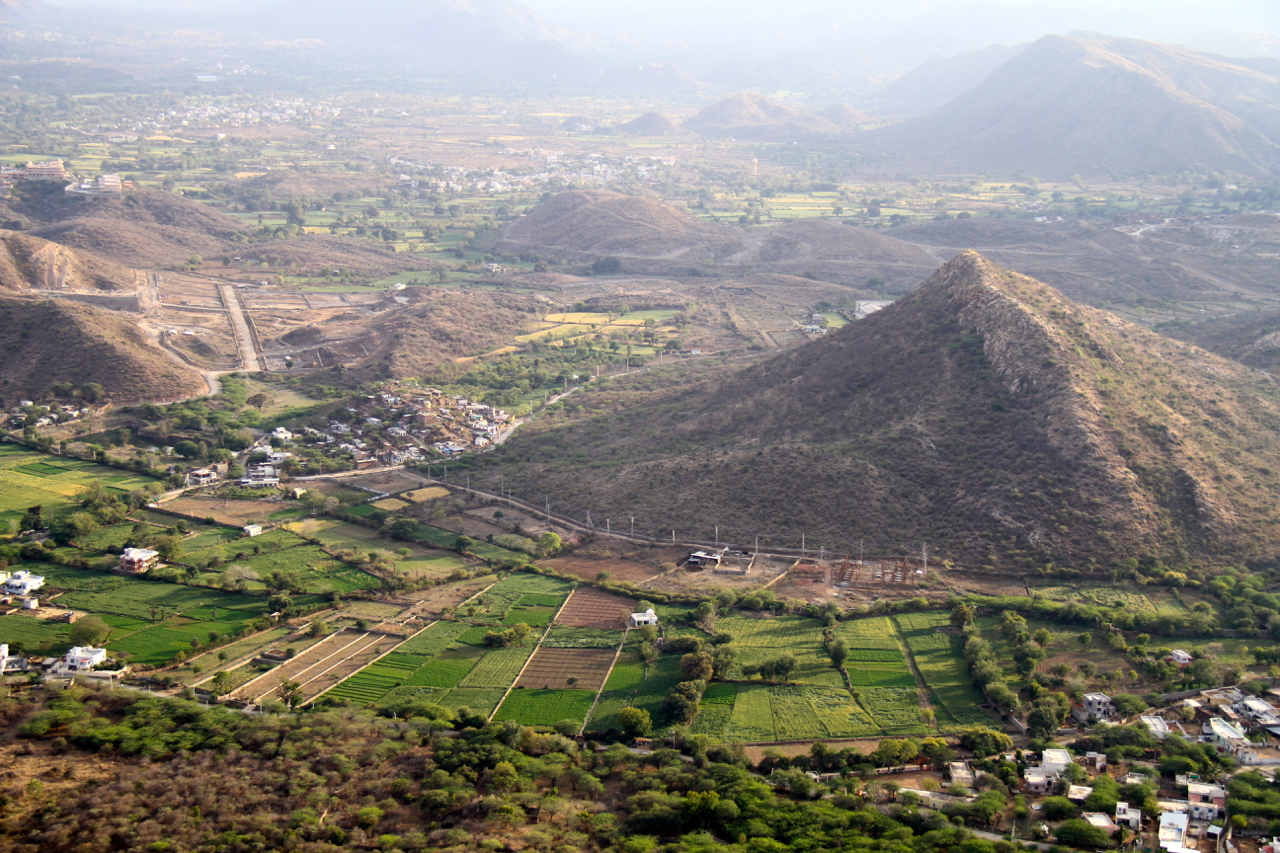
A rural village in Rajasthan, India

Rural settlements are forms of human habitation located in non-urban areas and represent one of the primary categories of settlements alongside urban settlements. Their definition varies across disciplines, with some fields treating them as distinct settlement types while others view them as stages within the broader process of urbanization. Rural settlements function as fundamental social spaces shaped by residents' production and living needs and serve as the basic units of traditional agrarian societies. They are typically characterized by low population density, close-knit social structures, and a reliance on local resources.

Rural settlements also reflect long-term relationships between people and the land, incorporating historical, cultural, and socio-political dimensions. Their form and organization are shaped by local environmental conditions and cultural practices, which are expressed through settlement layout, landscape patterns, architectural styles, and everyday life. These settlements are often understood through the concept of rurality, which emphasizes shared heritage, localized identity, and the integration of land use, built environment, and lifestyle. At the same time, rural settlements are commonly analyzed in terms of infrastructure, services, and amenities, reflecting their importance in development and planning contexts.

Rural settlements are closely associated with agriculture and other primary economic activities, and they frequently face constraints such as limited employment opportunities and uneven development. As a result, rural settlements are a major focus of planning and policy efforts aimed at improving living conditions, addressing environmental challenges, and promoting sustainable development.

=== Temporary ===
Temporary settlements (or temporary housing systems) refer to a broad range of non-permanent living arrangements for people who do not intend to settle long-term, including purpose-built temporary structures as well as existing permanent buildings used for short-term occupation. They arise from a variety of conditions, such as disasters, climate-related displacement, political conflict, migration, or personal life changes, and may function either as emergency solutions until permanent housing is secured or as deliberately chosen alternative living arrangements. Although "temporary" typically refers to intended duration rather than strict physical form, in practice these arrangements can sometimes extend over long periods, making distinction between temporary and permanent settlement somewhat unclear in some situations.

==== Refugee camp ====
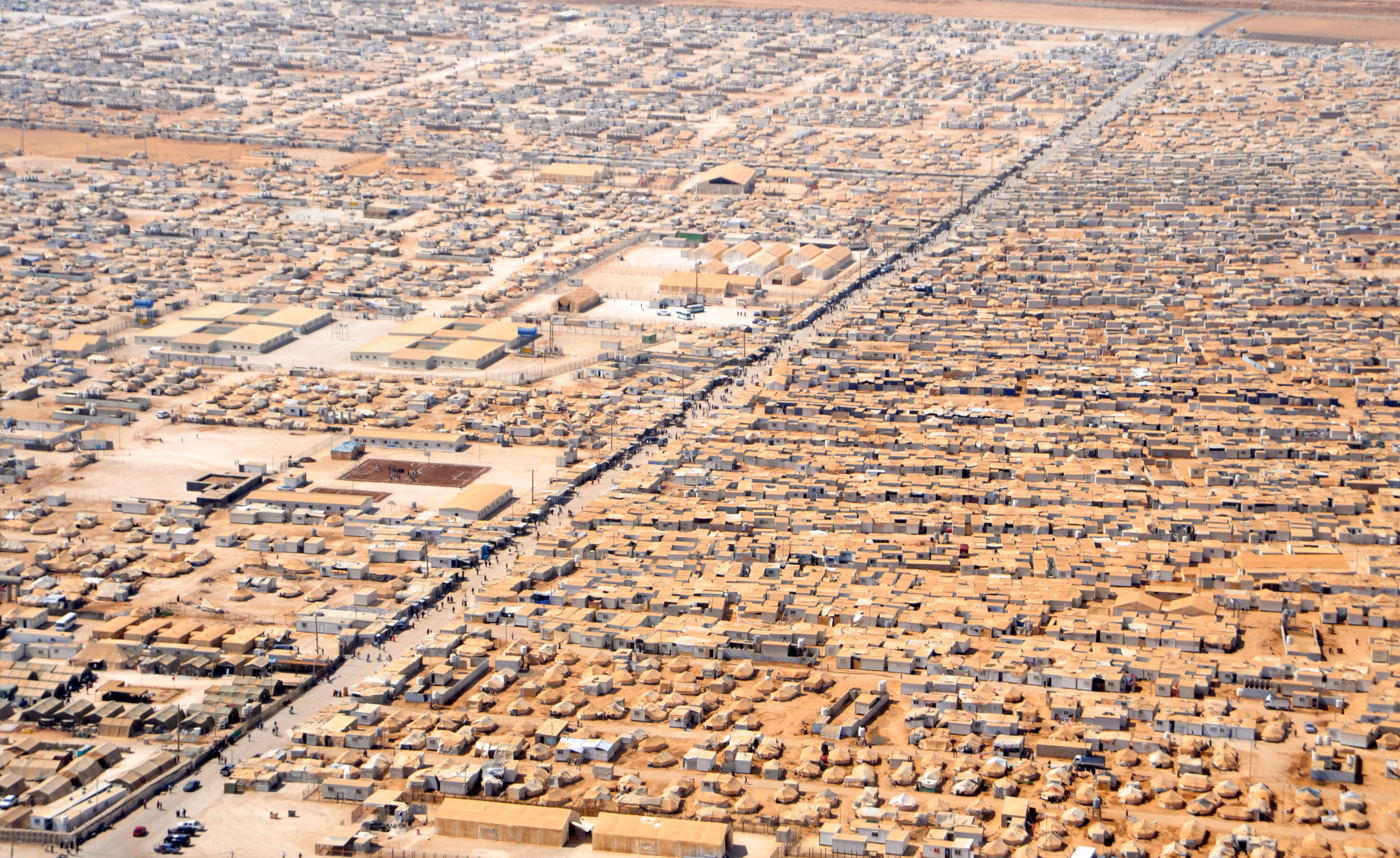
An aerial view of the Zaatari camp in Jordan for Syrian refugees

A refugee camp is a form of human settlement originally established as a temporary response to forced displacement, designed to provide immediate shelter and basic services for people fleeing conflict, persecution, or disaster. Although still commonly framed as provisional housing, many camps persist for extended periods and can grow into large, dense settlements that resemble cities in population size and function. They are typically organized and managed as interim solutions under humanitarian coordination systems, but in practice often develop complex internal structures, including economies, governance arrangements, and social systems created by both residents and aid organizations. This evolving reality has led research to increasingly view refugee camps not only as emergency shelters but as long-term, multifaceted human settlements requiring more structured planning and management approaches.

==== Post-disaster housing ====
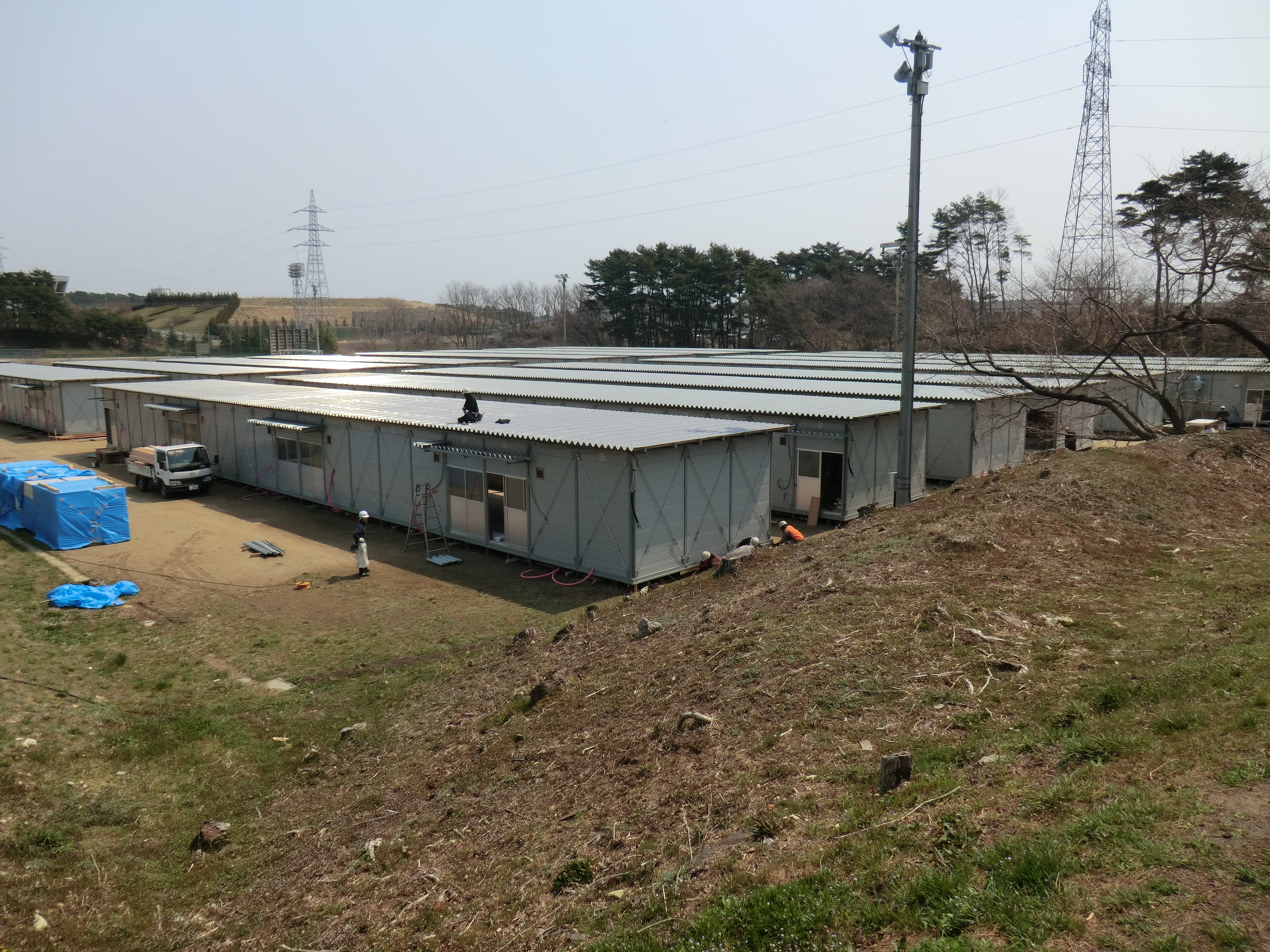
Temporary housing for tsunami evacuees in Shichigahama, Japan

Post-disaster housing is temporary accommodation provided to displaced populations between the immediate emergency response and the reconstruction of permanent dwellings. These settlements typically progress through stages, beginning with emergency shelter, followed by temporary shelters and longer-term temporary housing, before eventual transition to permanent reconstruction. Unlike planned settlements, post-disaster housing is characterized by rapid, often improvized development under conditions of uncertainty, resource constraint, and urgent need, resulting in spatial forms and layouts that are frequently provisional and subject to change. Despite their temporary nature, such settlements function as complete living environments, supporting basic shelter, social organization, and economic activity during the recovery period.

==== Nomadic camp ====
A nomadic camp is a temporary residential site used by mobile hunter-gatherer groups, whose location and structure are shaped by seasonal environmental conditions and subsistence activities rather than permanent occupation. Settlement patterns are closely tied to ecological cycles, with groups moving between different camps over the course of the year in response to changing food availability and environmental conditions. These camps are not fixed settlements, but are shifting bases for hunting, fishing, and gathering, with people alternating between inland and coastal environments depending on the season. Nomadic camps are typically lightweight and temporary in construction, allowing for their mobility and leaving only limited material traces for later interpretation. Movement between camps is part of wider subsistence activity rather than direct relocation, with travel functioning as a continuous search for resources.

== Spatial patterns of settlement ==
=== Nucleated (clustered) ===
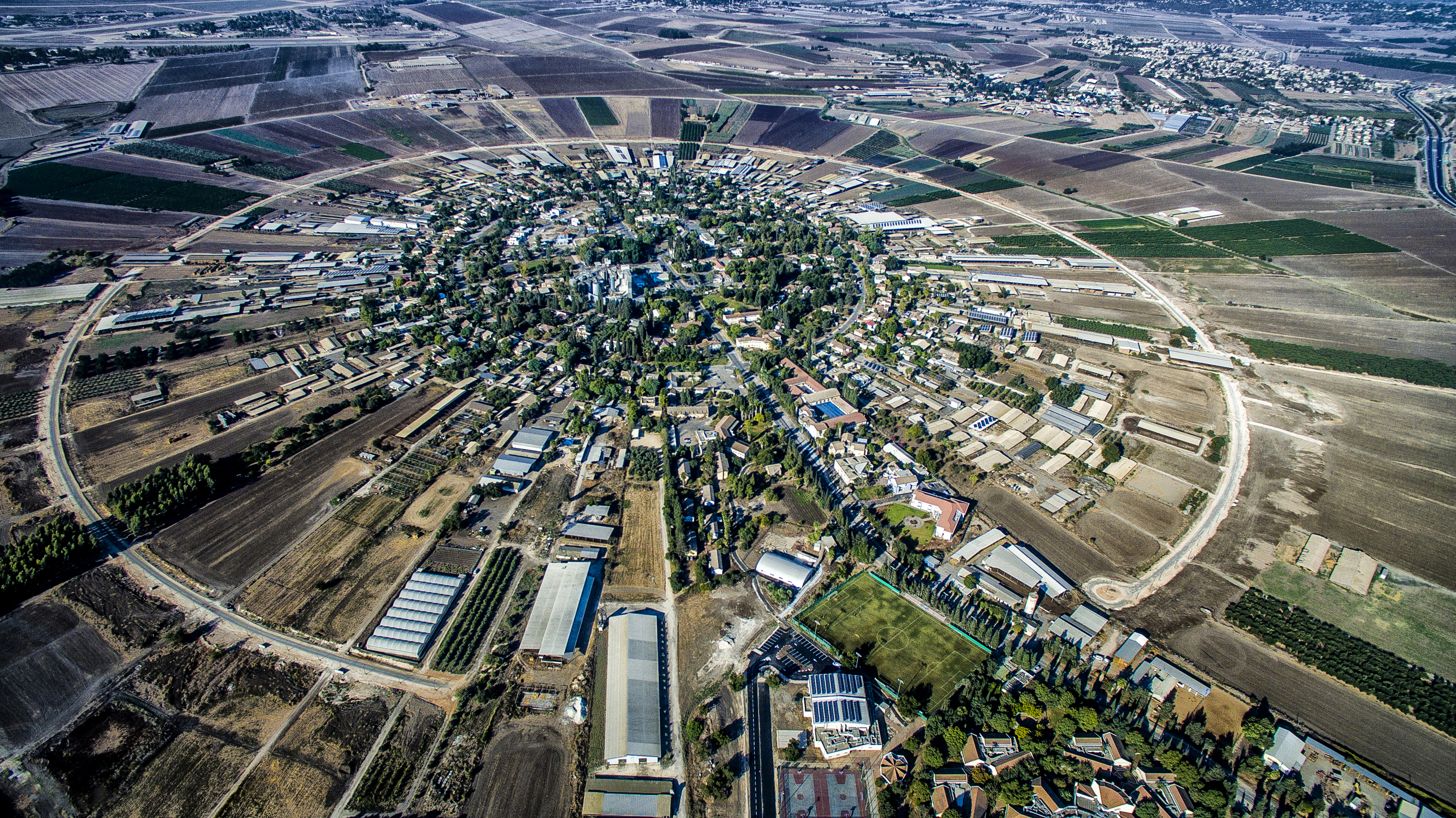
Moshav Nahalal in Jezreel Valley

Nucleated (or clustered) settlements are settlements in which buildings and population are concentrated in a relatively compact area rather than being spread out across the landscape. These settlements commonly develop around a central point such as a crossroads, water source, or established service center, where commercial, administrative, and social functions are provided to a surrounding hinterland. This concentration allows for easier access to goods and services within a relatively short distance. In some cases, nucleated patterns also form in response to localized economic activity, such as mining or resource extraction, where people and infrastructure cluster near a specific resource. As a result, nucleated settlements are characterized by high density and closely spaced development within a defined area.

=== Linear ===
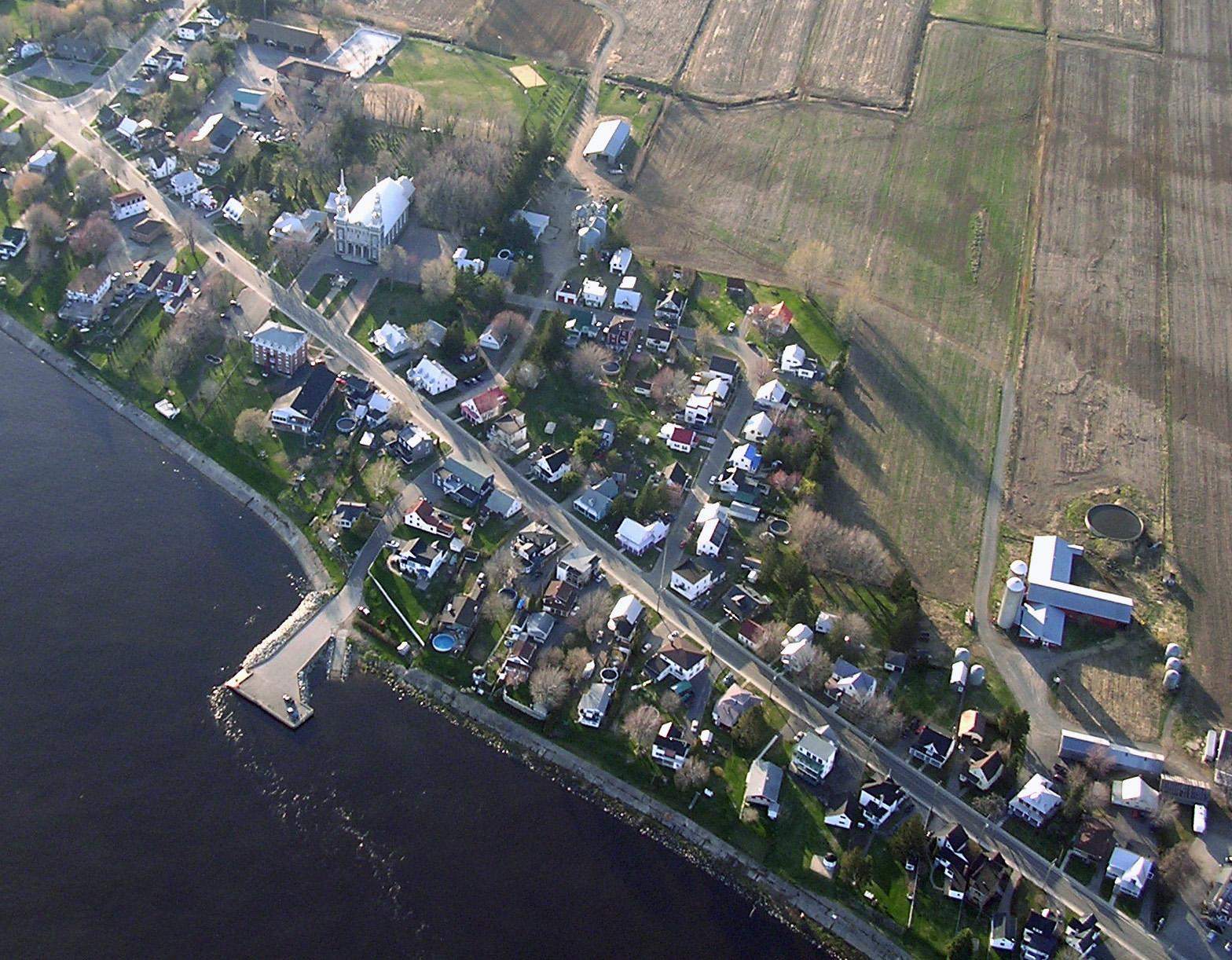
Some communities along the Saint Lawrence River in Quebec, Canada, developed as linear settlements, as is still clearly seen in Champlain.

Linear settlements are arranged along transport routes, forming a pattern in which settlements develop in a line following major corridors such as roads, railways, or waterways. These settlements often function as transport centers where goods or passengers are transferred between different modes of transportation, such as from ship to rail. Their location is determined by their connection to transportation networks, and they typically emerge at key transfer points along those routes. This results in an elongated distribution of settlements, with development concentrated along lines rather than spread evenly across an area.

=== Dispersed ===
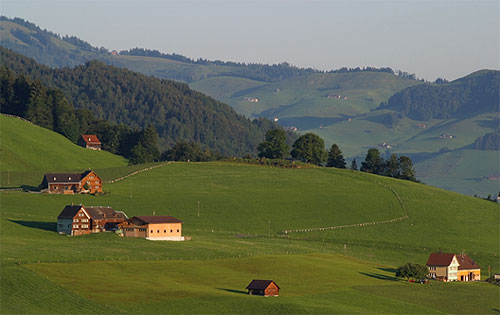
Dispersed settlement or Streusiedlung in Brülisau, Appenzell Innerrhoden, Switzerland

Dispersed settlements are a pattern of settlement in which dwellings are spread out over a wide area rather than concentrated in a single, compact location. They are typically made up of individual farmsteads and small hamlets separated by agricultural or natural land, resulting in a low-density distribution of population and buildings. Dispersed settlement patterns are found in many parts of the world, including Western Europe and North America. They commonly occur in rural and upland regions, where settlements may be widely spaced and closely associated with surrounding agricultural land use. In more scattered forms, dispersed settlements are often associated with foothill, tableland, and upland environments, and in some cases higher elevations where rugged terrain influences settlement distribution. In these areas, economic activities such as agriculture, livestock raising, and mining may be present, with small plots of land and dwellings adapted to local physical conditions, including practices such as terrace cultivation on slopes.

=== Isolated ===
Isolated rural settlements consist of separate farmsteads scattered across the countryside, where individual households live on their own farms rather than grouped in villages or hamlets. This pattern is especially common in rural areas of the United States, as well as in Canada, Australia, and parts of Europe. In the United States, it developed in the Middle Atlantic colonies and became widespread in the Midwest during westward expansion, particularly in extensive agricultural regions such as plains and plateaus, though it can also occur in mountainous areas where terrain encourages separation of dwellings.

== Settlement hierarchy ==
Diagram of a settlement hierarchy pyramid, showing increases and decreases in frequency and services

A settlement hierarchy is a system used to rank and classify settlements based on their size and the range of services they provide. Higher levels contain fewer settlements, but these are larger and offer more specialized and diverse services, while lower levels consist of many smaller settlements providing basic local services. This structure is typically shown as a pyramid, with numerous small settlements at the base and progressively fewer, larger settlements toward the top.

=== By size categorization ===
==== Homestead ====
A homestead single dwelling or small cluster of dwellings forming the most basic settlement unit.

==== Hamlet ====
A hamlet is a very small settlement, typically consisting of a small group of houses and often lacking key social and public institutions, such as a church or other communal facilities. It is characterized by a relative incompleteness of social and public life compared to larger settlement forms, meaning that many functions are fulfilled outside the hamlet in higher-level units such as towns or municipalities.

==== Village ====
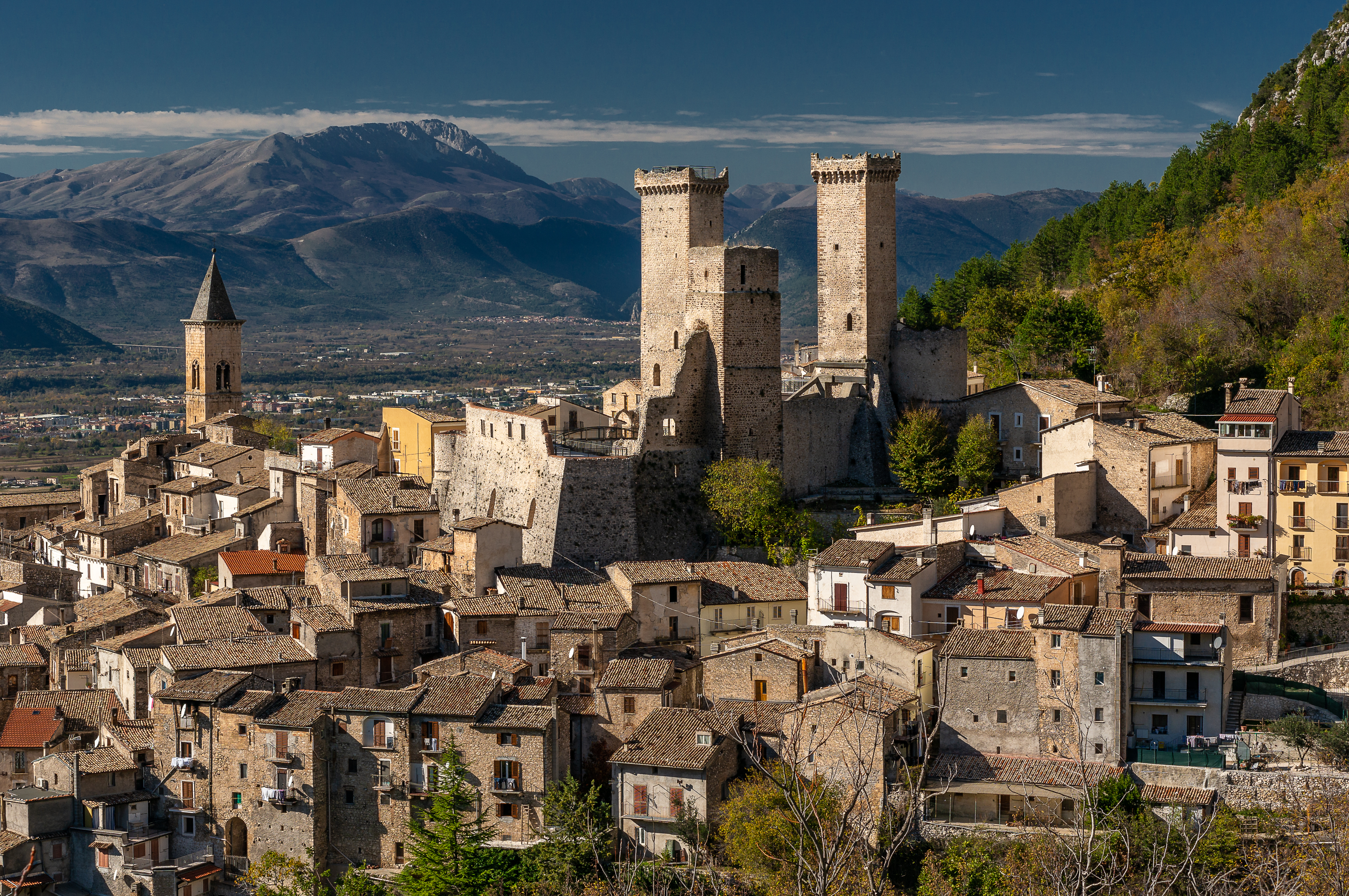
Pacentro, a village in Italy

A village is a small rural settlement, typically larger than a hamlet but smaller than a town, and often defined by geographers as having roughly 500–2,500 inhabitants. Villages are commonly organized around a central focal point such as a church, market, or public space, forming what is known as a nucleated settlement pattern. In other cases, villages may take a linear form, developing along natural features such as rivers or coastlines, or along transport routes such as roads and railways. In many countries, villages also function as administrative units with local governance responsibilities and basic service provision.

==== Town ====
A town is a human settlement that is generally larger than a village but smaller than a city, although the distinction between towns and cities is not fixed and varies across different countries and contexts. Towns typically have a relatively large population and offer a wider range of functions and services than villages, often serving as local centres for commerce, administration, and cultural activity. They may have developed historically through increased trade, economic specialization, and population growth, which encouraged the concentration of people in more complex settlements.

==== City ====
A city is a large and complex human settlement typically characterized by high population density, close spatial proximity of inhabitants, and a concentration of non-rural economic activities, governance, and services. It is generally understood as a permanent settlement in which a significant proportion of the population is engaged in industry, trade, administration, education, or other urban functions, supported by diverse institutions and infrastructure. Cities are also commonly defined by their role as centres of economic opportunity and interaction, often attracting migration from rural areas. While cities are often distinguished from smaller settlements, such as towns and villages, definitions vary across disciplines and contexts, and there is no single universally accepted definition.

==== Conurbation ====
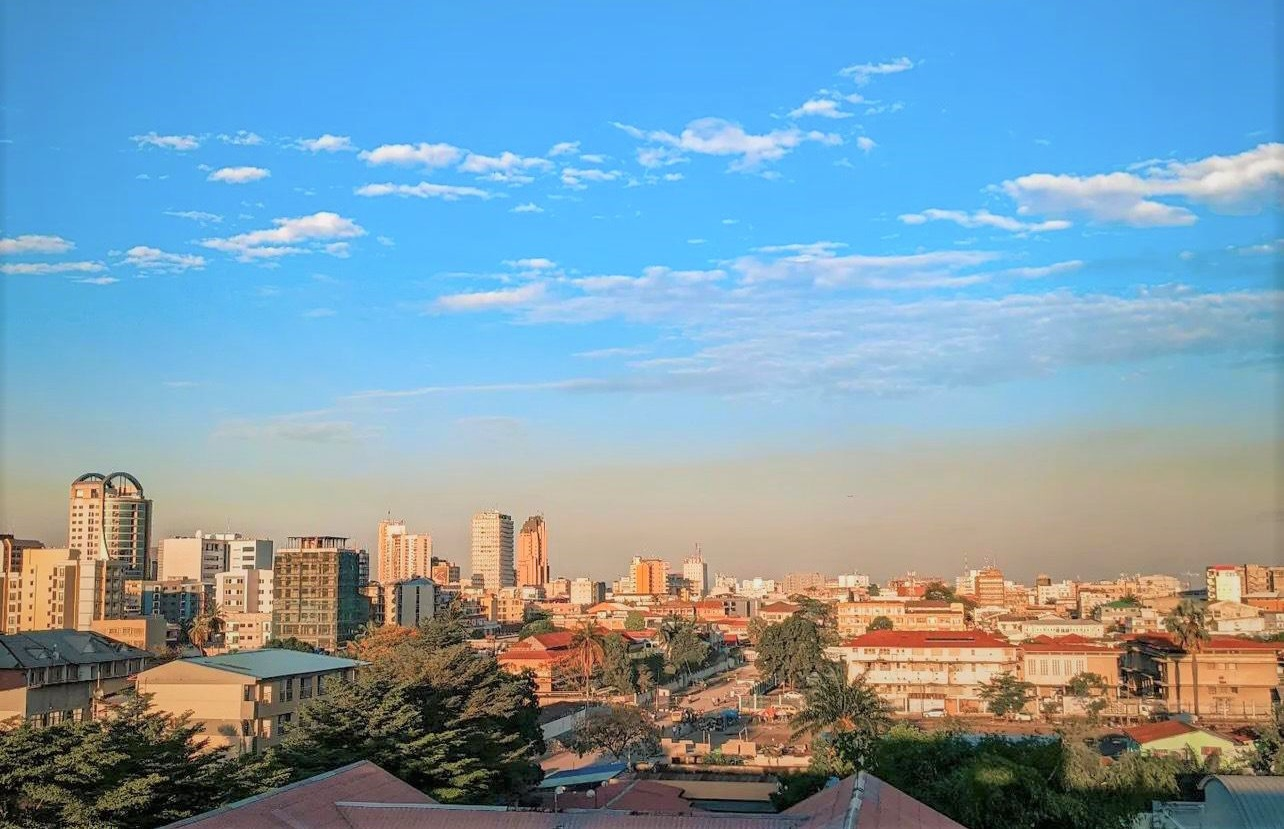
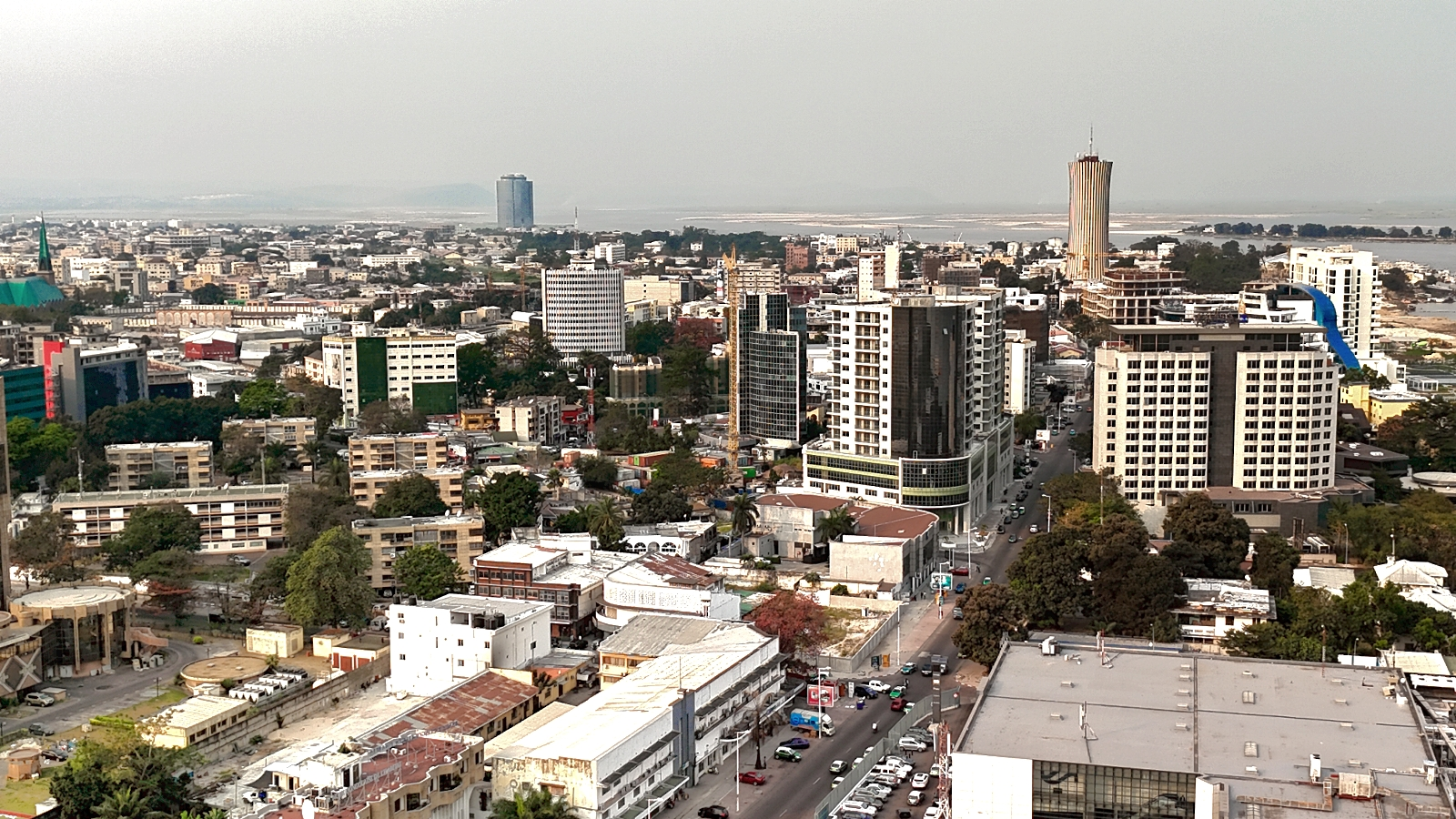
The capital cities of Kinshasa in the Democratic Republic of the Congo (left) and Brazzaville in the Republic of the Congo (right) form a conurbation. (see Kinshasa–Brazzaville)

A conurbation is a large urban area formed when expanding towns and cities grow together to create a continuous built-up region, often associated with urban sprawl. It develops through population growth and outward spatial expansion, linking previously separate settlements into an integrated urban system. The term was introduced by Patrick Geddes in the early 20th century in the context of urban and regional planning, originally describing the potential merging of major cities into larger urban regions. In modern usage, conurbations are found in many industrialized countries and are commonly used to describe extensive metropolitan regions where multiple urban centres are functionally and spatially connected.

==== Megacity ====
A megacity is a very large urban agglomeration typically defined by a population threshold of between 5 and 10 million inhabitants, although definitions vary by source and may also incorporate population density or the extent of the built-up area. The term is used to describe extensive metropolitan regions that may include dense core cities as well as surrounding conurbations and suburban areas. Megacities emerged in large numbers during the rapid urbanization of the late twentieth century, with most located in Asia and other developing regions, and their growth rates have varied significantly across regions over time. Despite concerns about administrative complexity, infrastructure strain, and environmental pressures, megacities continue to function as major centres of economic activity, governance, and population concentration.

==== Megalopolis ====
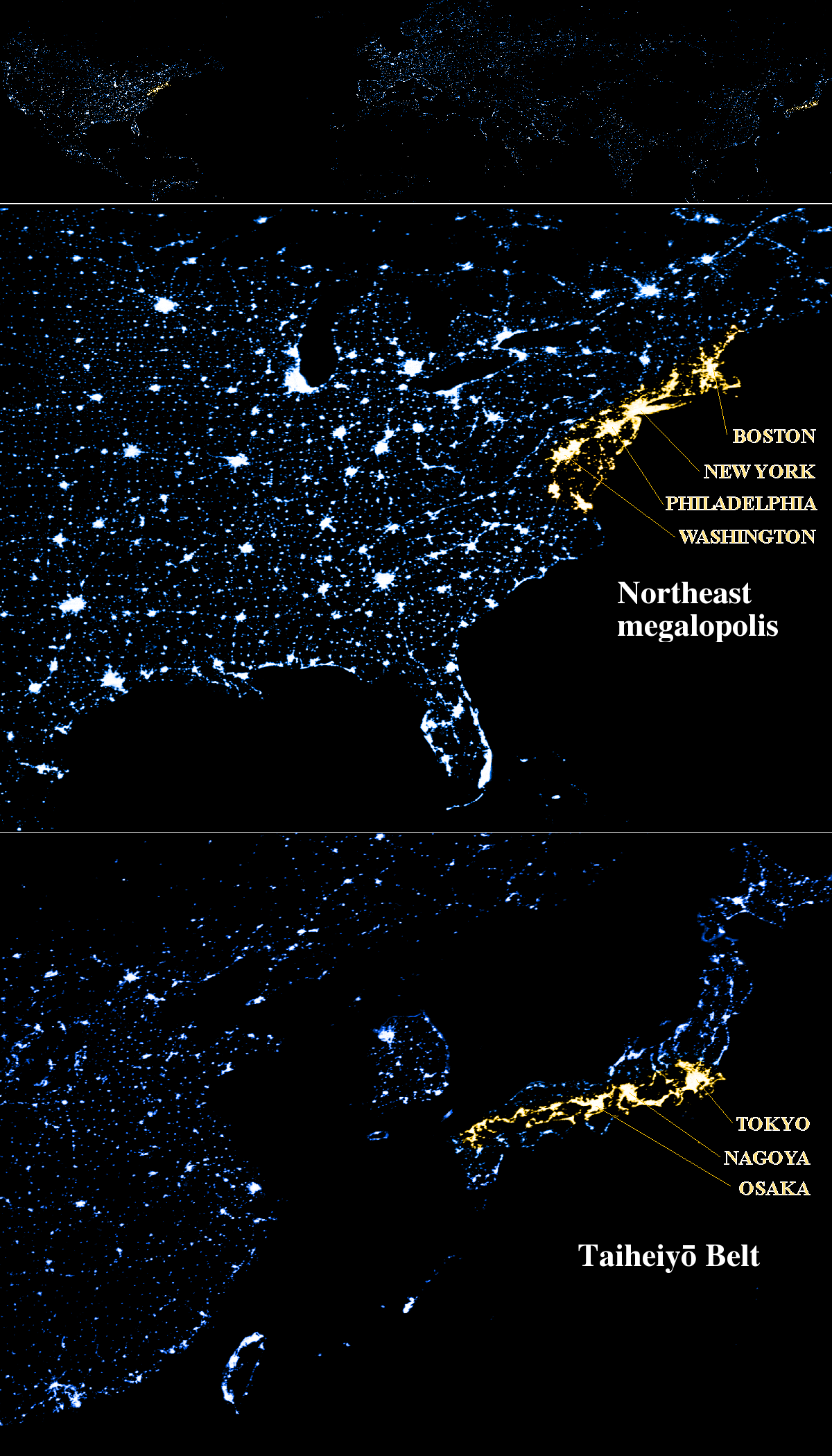
Northeast megalopolis, United States (top) and Taiheiyō Belt, Japan (bottom)

A megalopolis is a large-scale urban region formed by the coalescence of multiple metropolitan areas into a continuous or near-continuous urbanized zone. The concept was popularized by Jean Gottmann in his study of the northeastern United States ("BosWash"), where he described a polynuclear urban corridor linking major cities and surrounding suburban areas through transport and economic networks. The term is used to refer to extensive super-regional urban systems composed of interconnected metropolitan regions, often spanning multiple administrative boundaries and exhibiting high levels of spatial and functional integration.

==== Ecumenopolis ====
Ecumenopolis is a term coined by Constantinos Doxiadis to describe a hypothetical future global city formed by the interconnection of all major urban areas into a single worldwide urban system. It is the highest level in his ekistic hierarchy, above megalopolis, and represents a planetary-scale form of urbanization in which cities and metropolitan regions become functionally integrated through transport and communication networks.

=== By socio-political categorization ===
==== Municipality ====
A municipality is a unit of local government established within a defined geographic area to provide governance and public services for a specific population. It is typically created under the authority of a higher level of government and operates through a legal framework such as a municipal corporation, with powers granted by law or charter and exercised by elected officials. Municipalities may be designated as cities, towns, villages, or similar entities depending on the country, and form one of the basic types of local government alongside other administrative divisions. In other cases, a municipality may include a broad geographic area containing several nearby settlements. In different national contexts, equivalent units include the commune in France, the comune in Italy, the gemeente in the Low Countries, and similar local government units across Scandinavian countries, while systems in countries such as Great Britain and Germany include multiple categories of local government rather than a single uniform municipal structure.

==== Administrative seat ====
An administrative seat is the location where the central government offices of a political or administrative unit are situated and where its official functions are carried out. It serves as the primary base for governing authorities, such as councils or executives, and is typically the site where key decisions are made and administrative activities are coordinated for the surrounding area.

==== National capital ====
A capital city is an urban center in which political and administrative functions are concentrated, serving as the primary location for government institutions within a jurisdiction. This concentration is associated with patterns of urban growth, as capital cities often develop more rapidly than other cities due to the presence of legislative and bureaucratic institutions. The location of these institutions is often influenced by efficiency considerations, with governments tending to cluster facilities in a single place to reduce costs and improve coordination. Capital cities may also be centrally located to minimize transportation costs for residents accessing government services. As a result, capital cities play a significant role in shaping economic activity and urban development within their wider political and geographic context.

== Theoretical approaches ==
=== Central place theory ===
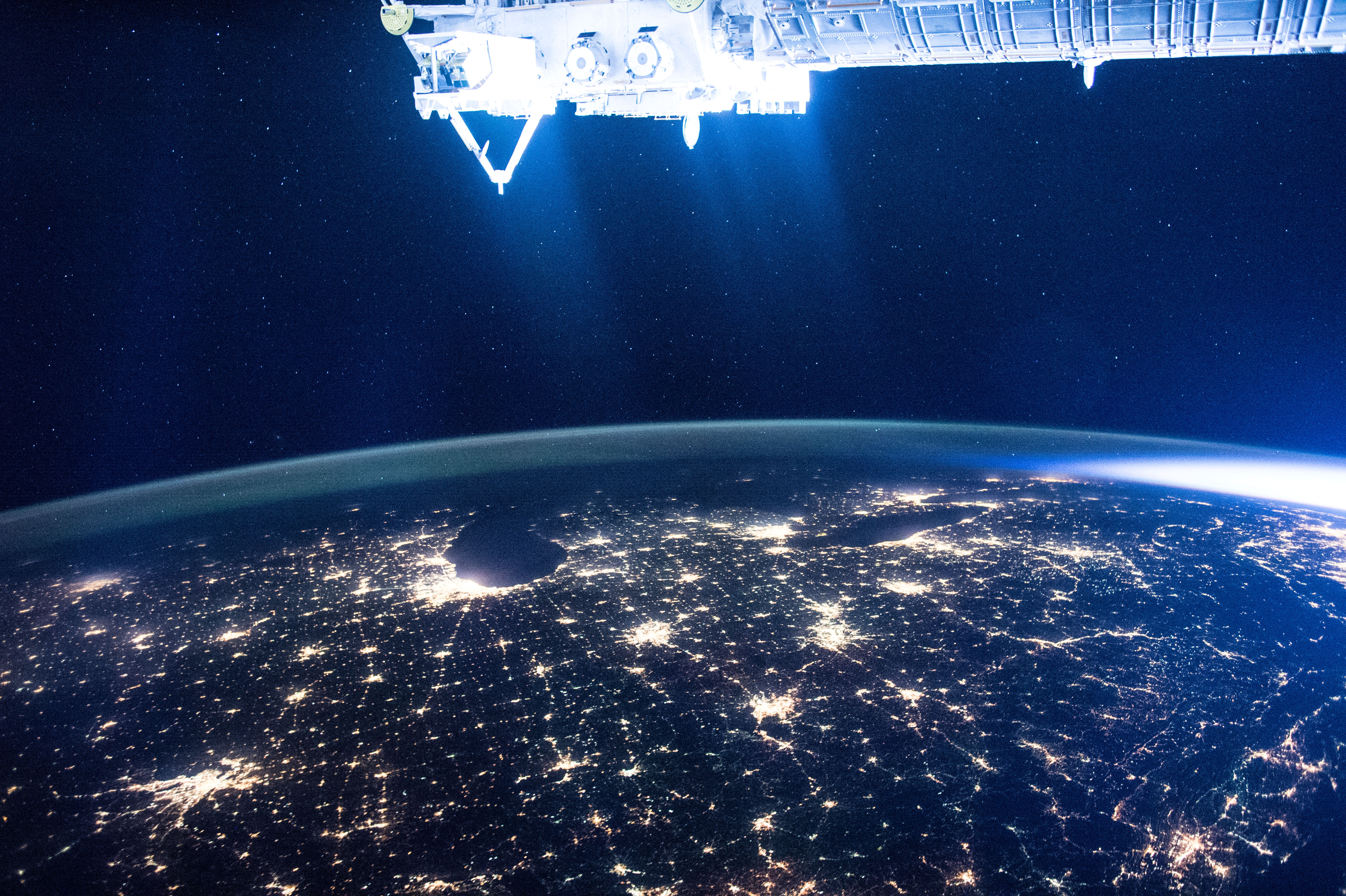
Satellite images of the American Midwest show settlements at different levels that are consistent with the central place theory.

Central place theory, introduced in 1933 by Walter Christaller, explains the spatial distribution of cities and settlements based on their role as providers of goods and services to surrounding areas. The theory is built on the concepts of threshold, the minimum market size needed for a service to be viable, and range, the maximum distance consumers are willing to travel for a good or service. Under ideal conditions, settlements of similar size and function are evenly spaced across a uniform, isotropic landscape with equal population density and purchasing power. Goods and services are classified from low-order (frequently purchased, basic items) to high-order (specialized, infrequently purchased goods), with higher-order services requiring larger market areas and being offered in fewer, larger centers. To efficiently cover space, market areas are conceptualized as overlapping geometric shapes, most commonly hexagons.

The theory assumes simplified conditions, including a flat and homogeneous landscape, evenly distributed population, equal transportation costs in all directions, and rational consumer behavior. It also assumes no political boundaries, no product differentiation, and no external economic influences, making it less applicable to real-world complexity. Despite these limitations, central place theory remains influential in understanding settlement hierarchies and the distribution of economic activity. August Lösch later expanded on Christaller's work by incorporating production and administrative functions into the model.

=== Ekistics ===
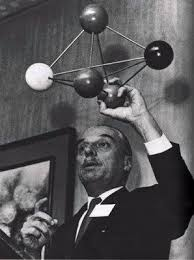
Doxiadis teaching the principles of ekistics

Ekistics is a term derived from the Greek word meaning "to settle down" and was introduced by Constantinos Doxiadis to denote a science of human settlements. It emerged in response to the growth of increasingly large and complex urban formations, including conurbations that could extend toward a worldwide city. Ekistics was intended to encompass all scales of human habitation and to examine them from a comprehensive perspective rather than focusing on a single discipline such as architecture, town planning, or geography. Its framework was based on a twofold classification system consisting of a hierarchy of fifteen settlement units, ranging from the individual and the dwelling to larger formations such as the neighborhood, town, city, metropolis, conurbation, megalopolis, and ultimately the ecumenopolis, alongside five elements common to all settlements: nature, society, shells, networks, and culture.

The theoretical principles of ekistics hold that settlements are created to satisfy human needs and that their development is a continuous process shaped by the dynamic balance of their elements. The form of settlements is understood as the result of a combination of centripetal, linear, and circumstantial forces. Ekistics did not develop into a fully defined scientific discipline with a rigorous methodological framework or explicit hypotheses, but rather functioned as an attempt to establish a broad and integrative body of knowledge on human settlements. Despite this, its concepts have influenced a range of fields and approaches, including ecological and environmental studies, the application of information technology in planning, and urban design movements such as New Urbanism.

This system organizes settlements into fifteen distinct units that provide a structured scale for analyzing human habitation from the smallest dwelling to global urbanization. They are as follows:

Unit number	Ekistic unit	Population
1	Anthropos (man)	1
2	Room	2
3	House (dwelling)	4
4	Housegroup	40
5	Small neighborhood (precinct)	250
6	Neighbourhood	1,500
7	Small polis (small town)	9,000
8	Polis (town)	50,000
9	Small metropolis (large city)	300,000
10	Metropolis	2,000,000
11	Small megalopolis (conurbation)	14,000,000
12	Megalopolis	100,000,000
13	Small eperopolis (urbanized region)	700,000,000
14	Eperopolis (urbanized continent)	5,000,000,000
15	Ecumenopolis	30,000,000,000

=== Modern theories of settlement ===
==== Multiple nuclei model ====
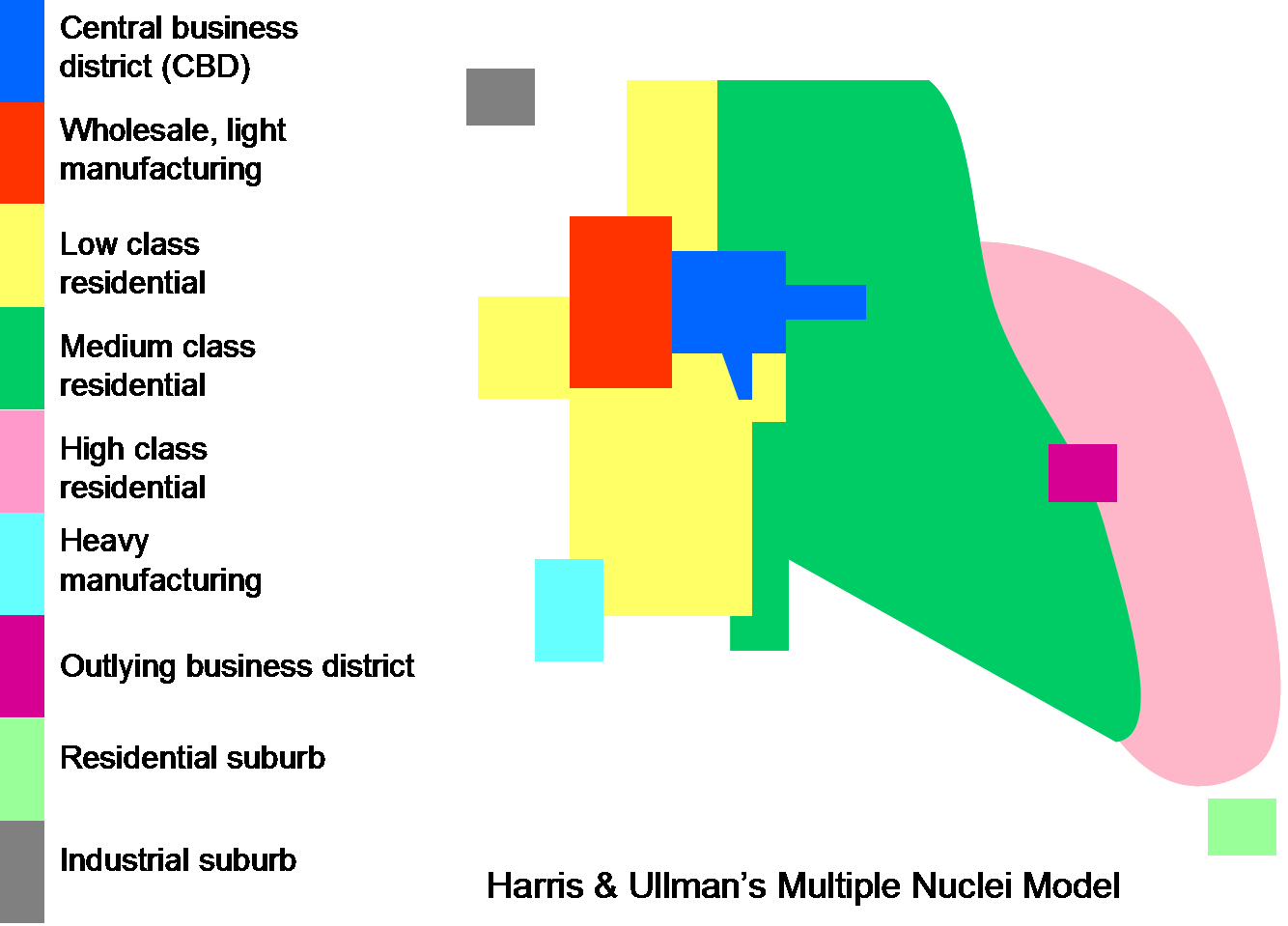
Harris and Ullman's multiple nuclei model

The multiple nuclei model was proposed by Chauncy Harris and Edward Ullman in 1945 in their article The Nature of Cities. The model describes urban land use as structured around multiple centers, or nuclei, rather than a single central business district. These nuclei develop as a result of differing land-use requirements, with certain activities clustering together while others are separated due to incompatibility. Urban areas are therefore characterized by a series of specialized districts, including commercial centers, industrial areas, and residential neighborhoods of varying socioeconomic status. Each nucleus exerts influence on the surrounding area, contributing to a decentralized pattern of urban development.

==== Settlement scaling theory ====
Settlement scaling theory (SST) is a framework for understanding urbanization in which settlements are treated as spatially embedded networks of social interaction, and where measurable settlement characteristics are related in systematic ways to population size. It proposes that aggregate properties of both ancient and contemporary settlement systems scale in similar ways across time, geography, and culture. These patterns are observed in archaeological and historical datasets, where scaling relationships show consistent exponents across cases. The theory further finds that larger settlements tend to become denser and exhibit higher levels of socio-economic activity. These regularities are consistent across ancient and modern systems, as similar scaling results are found in contemporary urban datasets. SST provides a unified framework for the study of urbanization across time, in which observed quantitative regularities are interpreted as reflecting general properties of human settlements.

==== Rural settlement theory ====
Rural settlement theory explains changes in the spatial distribution of rural settlements over time as the outcome of a set of spatial processes operating during population occupation and agricultural development. It identifies three stages of development: colonization, in which settlement expands into previously unoccupied areas; spread, in which density increases through short-distance dispersal; and competition, in which increasing density produces more regular spacing as rural inhabitants compete for limited space. The theory holds that settlement form reflects the spatial outcome of these processes, with patterns shifting from clustered to increasingly regular arrangements as density rises and competition intensifies under relatively homogeneous environmental conditions. Empirical tests using settlement data from Iowa between 1870 and 1960 indicated increasing regularity over time, consistent with theoretical expectations, with statistical fitting showing a shift from clustered to regular spatial distributions.

=== Evolutionary approaches to settlement systems ===
Evolutionary approaches in human geography describe settlement systems as dynamic and shaped by long-term historical processes rather than fixed spatial arrangements. These perspectives emphasize path dependence, in which earlier patterns of development influence subsequent growth, and view settlements as components of interconnected systems whose evolution is driven by interaction, competition, and innovation. Within this framework, settlements are understood as networks of exchange involving flows of goods, population, and information between places. The intensity and spatial range of these interactions vary according to the functional level of settlements and tend to expand over time with technological change, a process associated with "space-time contraction", while physical geography may also influence patterns of interaction by shaping effective distance.

In contrast to equilibrium-based models such as central place theory, evolutionary approaches emphasize continuous change and the absence of a stable end state. Settlement growth is influenced by economic performance, accumulated wealth, and existing size, while also incorporating stochastic variation, contributing to uneven development and the emergence of settlement hierarchies. Settlements may gain or lose functions over time depending on factors such as population, wealth, and proximity to other centers, while innovation and the diffusion of new technologies drive further transformation. Overall, settlement patterns are interpreted as the result of ongoing processes of self-organization, in which local interactions produce broader spatial structures over time.

== Decline and abandonment ==
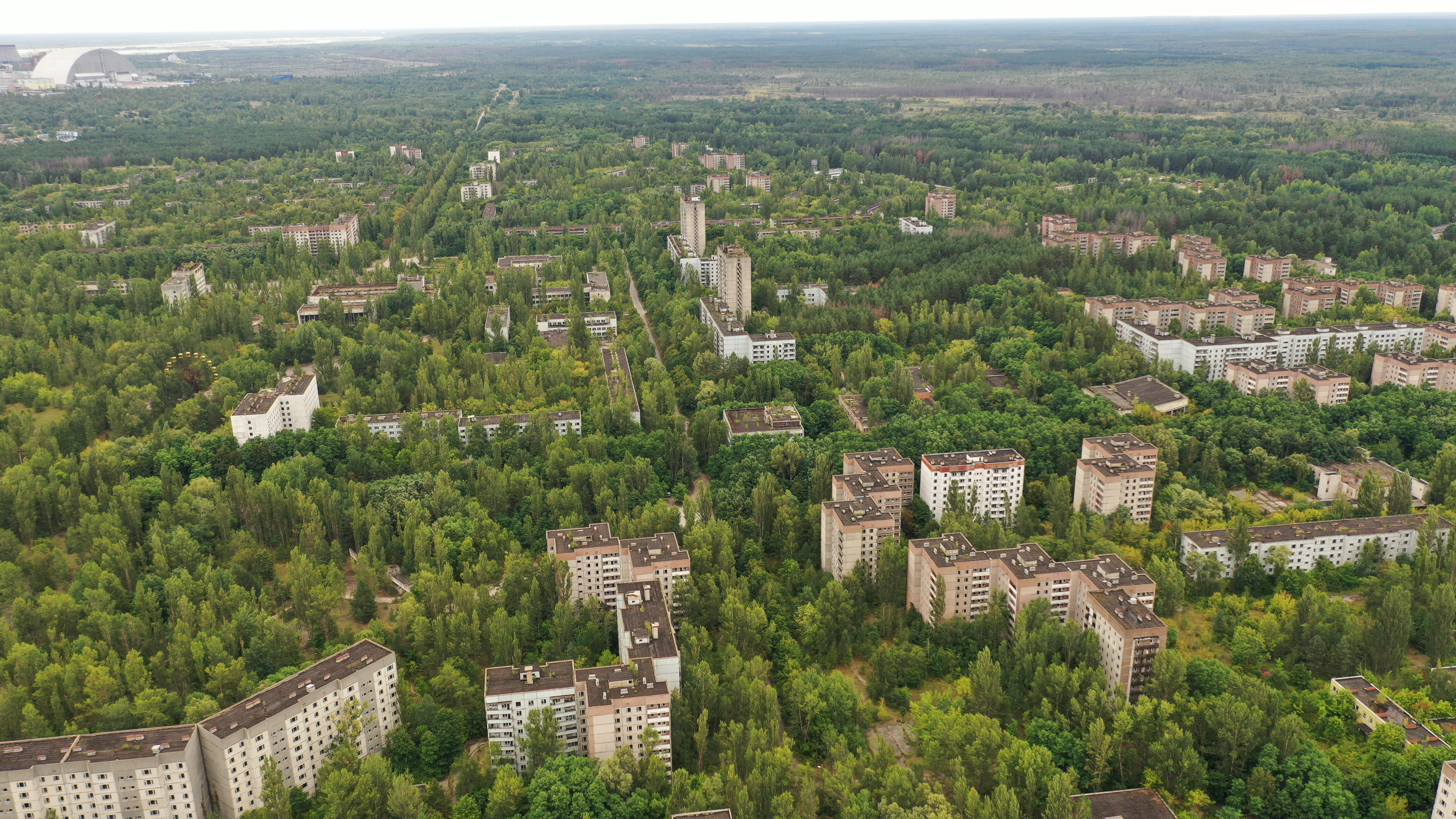
The city of Pripyat in Kyiv Oblast, Ukraine was famously abandoned after the 1986 Chernobyl disaster.

Settlement abandonment may result from the interaction of multiple factors rather than a single cause. Factors associated with settlement failure include economic conditions, living standards, demographic change, and the ability of settlers to adapt to new physical and cultural environments. The study of abandoned settlements has been used to examine broader processes of frontier development and colonization, with researchers arguing that the factors contributing to settlement failure are as important to understanding settlement patterns as those associated with successful communities.
