= Barbara Lukermann =

American urban planner

- Born: February 19, 1930; Gomersal, England, United Kingdom
- Died: March 23, 2009 (aged 79); Falcon Heights, Minnesota, United States
- Political party: Democratic
- Spouse: Fred Lukermann
- Children: Bruno Lukermann (son); Kathryn Lukermann (daughter); Carla Lukermann (step-daughter)

Barbara L. Lukermann (February 19, 1930 – March 23, 2009) was a teacher and a fellow at the Humphrey Institute. She also led the Metropolitan Waste Control Commission.

== Personal life ==
Born in Gomersal, England, on February 19, 1930, Lukermann was inspired to go into geography studies by a grammar school teacher. She moved to the United States in the mid-1950s to pursue a graduate degree. She earned an undergraduate degree from Cambridge University and eventually enrolled at the University of Minnesota, said at the time to have one of the best geography departments in the country.

== Public service ==
Lukermann, considered a pioneer in urban planning, joined the Hubert H. Humphrey Institute in 1982 and was there until 2008. She was a teacher and a senior fellow in the institute's planning program.

Lukermann also was a senior research associate with the university's Center for Urban and Regional Affairs. She was a former chairwoman of the Metropolitan Waste Control Commission and a board member at St. Paul District Energy, and was president of the Citizens League.

Lukermann had a national and international reputation, traveling to China and Romania in the 1980s to make presentations. She also served as part of a federal advisory group that helped the Navajo Nation with urban planning.
