= Morris Kleiner =

Morris M. Kleiner
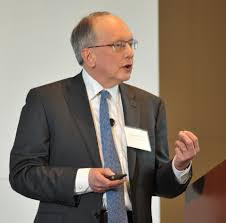
- Kleiner in 2023
- Education: University of Illinois Urbana-Champaign; Bradley University
- Scientific career
- Fields: labor economics, industrial relations
- Workplaces: University of Kansas (1974–1987); University of Minnesota (1987–)

Morris M. Kleiner is an American academic. He is a professor and the inaugural AFL-CIO chair in labor policy at the Hubert H. Humphrey School of Public Affairs at the University of Minnesota, Minneapolis. From 1974 to 1987 he was an assistant and later full professor at the School of Business at the University of Kansas.

Kleiner received his undergraduate degree in economics from Bradley University and his M.A. in Labor and Industrial Relations from the School of Labor and Employment Relations (University of Illinois Urbana-Champaign), and Ph.D. in economics in 1974 from the University of Illinois Urbana-Champaign. Kleiner has published extensively in the top academic journals in labor economics and industrial relations, and is the author, co-author, or co-editor of nine books. His books "Licensing Occupations: Ensuring Quality or Restricting Competition" and "Stages of Occupational Regulation: Analysis of Case Studies" were selected as "Noteworthy Books in Industrial Relations and Labor Economics" for 2006 and 2013 by the Princeton University, Industrial Relations Section. His most recent book with Maria Koumenta published in 2022 was entitled Grease or Grit?: International Case Studies of Occupational Licensing and Its Effects on Efficiency and Quality was published by Upjohn Press. Kleiner is a research associate with the National Bureau of Economic Research in Cambridge, Massachusetts. He was also a senior scholar at Opportunity and Inclusive Growth Institute at the Federal Reserve Bank of Minneapolis, a visiting scholar at the Upjohn Institute for Employment Research, a Staff Associate at the Brookings Institution, and a visiting scholar and fellow at the Hoover Institution at Stanford University. He was selected as an Academic Fellow of the Labor and Employment Relations Association and later received the Lifetime Achievement Award for 2018 from the Association for his contributions to the field of industrial relations and human resources. In 2024 he received the Economics Career Achievement Alumni Award from the University of Illinois Department of Economics. In 2026, he received the Lifetime Achievement Award from the Knee Regulatory Research Center at West Virginia University for his work on regulatory analysis and policy.

Kleiner has published editorials for the Wall Street Journal, New York Times, Washington Post, Minneapolis Star-Tribune, and the Des Moines Register. He has been frequently asked for comments on labor issues by the national press and media. He also has been on National Public Radio's The Takeaway, On Point, and Marketplace, as well as appearances at the National Press Club, MSNBC, CNN, and many podcasts. He has been an adviser to the Federal Trade Commission, U.S. Council of Economic Advisers, and the National Economic Council. He has provided invited testimony and evidence to the U.S. Senate Judiciary Committee, U.S. House of Representatives Small Business Committee, many state legislatures, European Union, Bank of Italy, Organization for Economic Cooperation and Development (OECD), World Health Organization (WHO), and the World Bank.

== Bibliography ==
- Kleiner, Morris; R. Block; M. Roomkin; S. Salsburg (1987). Human Resources and the Performance of the Firm. Madison, Wisconsin: Industrial Relations Research Association.
- Kleiner, Morris; R. McLean; G. Dreher (1988). Labor Markets and Human Resource Management. Glenview, Illinois: Scott Foresman and Co.
- Kleiner, Morris; M. Bognanno (1992). Labor Market Institutions and the Future Role of Unions. Oxford: Blackwell Co. ISBN 9781557863423.
- Kleiner, Morris; B. Kaufman (1993). Employee Representation: Alternatives and Future Directions. Madison, Wisconsin: Industrial Relations Research Association and Cornell University, ILR Pres.
- Kleiner, Morris (1994). Industrial Relations: Institutions and Organizational Performance. London: Dartmouth Publishing Co.
- Kleiner, Morris (2006). Licensing Occupations: Ensuring Quality or Restricting Competition?. Kalamazoo, Michigan: W.E. Upjohn Institute for Employment Research. doi:10.17848/9781429454865. ISBN 9781429454865.
- Kleiner, Morris (2013). Stages of Occupational Regulation: Analysis of Case Studies. Kalamazoo, Michigan: W.E. Upjohn Institute for Employment Research. doi:10.17848/9780880994613. ISBN 9780880994613.
- Kleiner, Morris (2015). Guild-Ridden Labor Markets: The Curious Case of Occupational Licensing, W.E. Upjohn Institute for Employment Research, Kalamazoo, Michigan.] http://www.upjohn.org/publications/upjohn-institute-press/guild-ridden-labor-markets-curious-case-occupational-licensing
