= Humphrey School of Public Affairs =

Public policy school of the University of Minnesota

University of Minnesota Humphrey School of Public Affairs
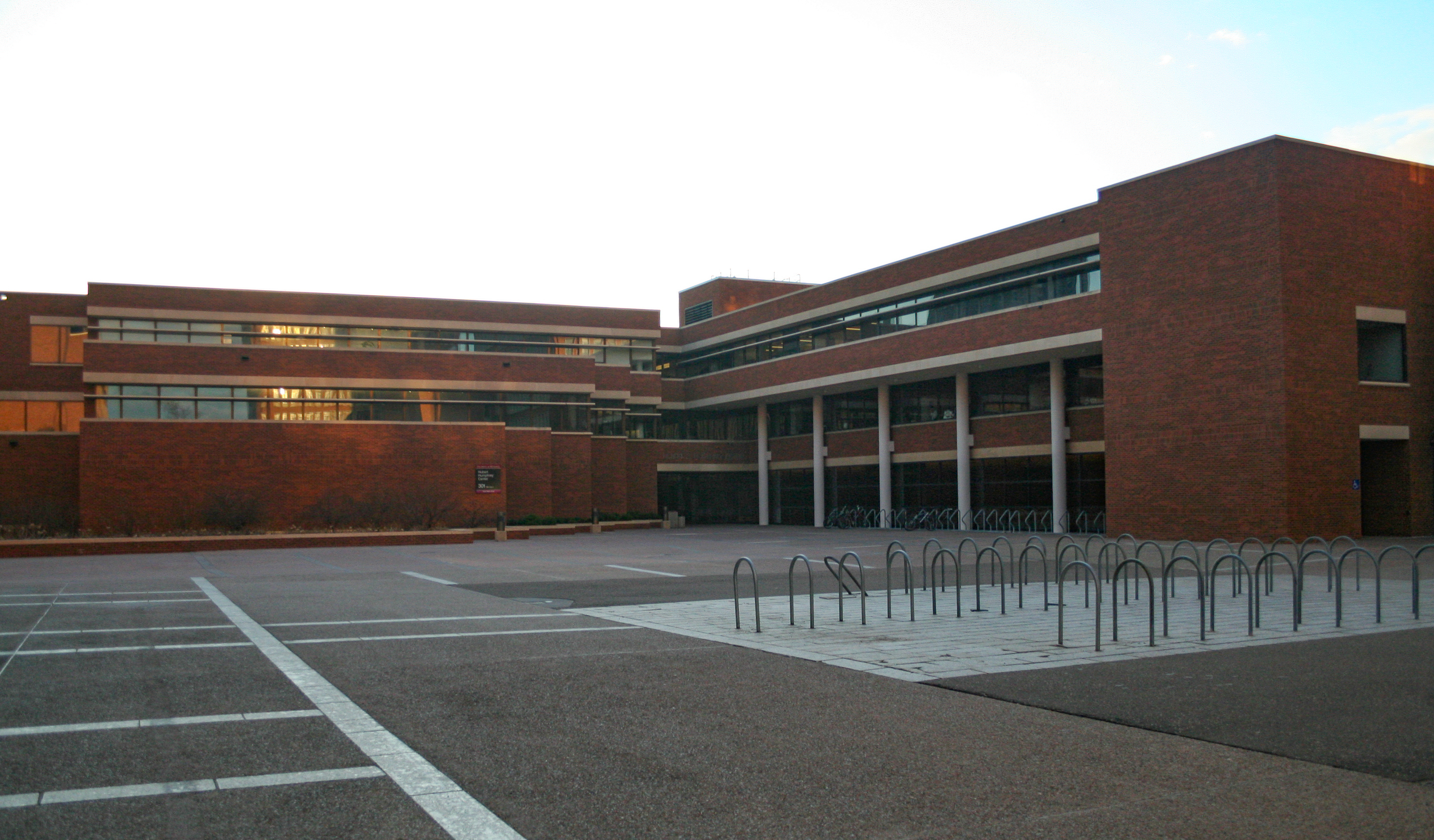
- The Humphrey School of Public Affairs on the West Bank of the University of Minnesota-Twin Cities Campus in 2007
- Type: Public public policy and planning school
- Established: 1977
- Parent institution: University of Minnesota
- Dean: Nisha Botchwey
- Academic staff: 63
- Students: 416
- Location: Minneapolis, Minnesota, United States
- Campus: Urban
- Website: hhh.umn.edu

The Hubert H. Humphrey School of Public Affairs is a public policy and planning school at the University of Minnesota, a public land-grant research university in the Twin Cities of Minneapolis and Saint Paul, Minnesota. It is named after Hubert Humphrey, former Vice President of the United States and presidential candidate. The school is located on the West Bank of the University of Minnesota, which is also home to the University of Minnesota Law School and Carlson School of Management in Minneapolis. The Humphrey School is accredited by the Network of Schools of Public Policy, Affairs, and Administration (NASPAA).

== History ==
The University of Minnesota's graduate program for public policy was founded on the East Bank campus in 1938 as the Public Administration Center. In 1968, it achieved autonomy as a graduate school within the university and became the School of Public Affairs. The School was replaced in 1977 with the founding of the Humphrey Institute of Public Affairs, named to honor former Vice President Hubert Humphrey for his contributions to improving the well-being of humanity. It was renamed the Humphrey School of Public Affairs in 2011 to better reflect its academic mission.

== Academics ==
Degrees offered at the Humphrey School include:

- Master of Public Policy (MPP)
- Mid-career Master of Public Affairs (MPA)
- Master of Urban and Regional Planning (MURP)
- Master of Science in Science, Technology, and Environmental Policy (MS-STEP)
- Master of Development Practice (MDP)
- Master of Human Rights (MHR)
- Ph.D in Public Policy
- Dual degrees are offered with the Carlson School of Management (M.B.A.), University of Minnesota Law School (Juris Doctor), Social Work (M.S.W.), University of Minnesota School Public Health (Master of Public Health) and the departments of Architecture and Landscape Architecture (Master of Landscape Architecture) and Civil Engineering (Master of Science in Civil Engineering)

The school offers fellowships for Peace Corps volunteers and waives the application fee for the fellowships. Graduate certificates are also offered.

== Research centers ==
- Center for Science, Technology, and Environmental Policy
- Center for the Study of Politics and Governance
- Center on Women, Gender, and Public Policy
- Freeman Center for International Economic Policy
- Public and Nonprofit Leadership Center
- Roy Wilkins Center for Human Relations and Social Justice
- State and Local Policy Program
- Center for Integrative Leadership
- Human Capital Research Collaborative

== Notable alumni ==
- Johanna Bond, law professor and academic administrator

== Notable faculty ==
- J. Brian Atwood, former Administrator of United States Agency for International Development (USAID) (1993–2000)
- John Brandl, former dean of the Humphrey School of Public Affairs and DFL Minnesota state senator
- Robert H. Bruininks, Professor Emeritus and 15th President of the University of Minnesota (2002–2011)
- Harlan Cleveland, former U.S. Ambassador to NATO
- Lawrence R. Jacobs, leading public intellectual and founder of the Center for the Study of Politics and Governance
- Geri M. Joseph, former U.S. Ambassador to the Netherlands
- Morris Kleiner, AFL–CIO Chair in Labor Policy
- Barbara Lukermann, pioneer in urban planning
- Eric Magnuson, former Chief Justice of the Minnesota Supreme Court
- Walter F. Mondale, 42nd Vice President of the United States (1977–1981)
- R.T. Rybak, former Mayor of Minneapolis (2002–2014) and Vice Chair of the Democratic National Committee
- Eric P. Schwartz, former dean of the Humphrey School of Public Affairs and former U.S. Assistant Secretary of State for Population, Refugees, and Migration
