= Fred E. Lukermann =

American geographer (1921–2009)

Fred Emil Lukermann Jr. (December 9, 1921 – September 1, 2009) was an American geographer. He was born in Minneapolis and attended the University of Minnesota, the university at which he later led a successful career. In honor of Lukermann's contributions to the state of Minnesota, Governor Rudy Perpich named the day September 18, 1989 "Fred E. Lukermann Day".

Lukermann was born on December 9, 1921, in Minneapolis, Minnesota; he attended Roosevelt High School, and lived at the same address until he left for college. When he first joined the University of Minnesota, he intended to become a teacher, but became interested in geography and began coursework in it around his sophomore year. Lukermann took time off of school to serve in the U.S. Army Medical Corps during World War II, and received a B.S. (1948), an M.A. (1950), and a Ph.D. (1997) once returning to university.

Lukermann joined the faculty of the University of Minnesota's geography department in the early 1950s, and helped the program rise to national prominence while serving as department chair. From 1978 until his 1989 retirement, Lukermman served as dean of the university's College of Liberal Arts. His wife, Barbara Lukermann, died in 2009, preceding Fred in death. The two were residents of Falcon Heights, Minnesota. At the time of his death, Fred had advised 21 Ph.D. students.
