= Edward Ullman =

American geographer (1912–1976)

Multiple nuclei model by Chauncy Harris and Edward Ullman

Edward Louis Ullman (1912 – 1976), son of classical scholar Berthold Ullman, was trained as a geographer at University of Chicago where he was influenced by the urban and economic emphasis in social science. He was an urban geographer, transportation researcher and regional development specialist and became the champion of applied geography. His study and dissertation on the economic aspects of Mobile, Ullman began a career of transit studies. He was the Office of Strategic Services transportation specialist in World War II.

After the war he served as a lieutenant in the United States Navy Reserve and was an economist for the United States Maritime Commission. He also did research for the Joint Chiefs of Staff in the Pentagon and the State Department. In 1951 he began his academic work at the Department of Geography, University of Washington and was a Fulbright research professor at the Sapienza University of Rome in 1956-1957. He did academic work in Germany and Israel. The Nuclear Regulatory Commission and Amtrak utilized his services in their formative years.

He proposed that trade was an interaction based on three phenomena: complementarity, intervening opportunities, and transferability of commodities.

The level of interaction can be measured by the Gravity model of trade:

$I_{i,j} = \frac{p_ip_j}{d_{i,j}^\beta}$

Where:

- I: Level of interaction between i,j. alternatively, quantity of trade between i,j.
- P_{i} = population of i
- d_{i,j} = distance separating i,j
- β = impedance factor

== See also ==
- Geographers on Film
