= Nisha Botchwey =

Jamaican-American academic administrator

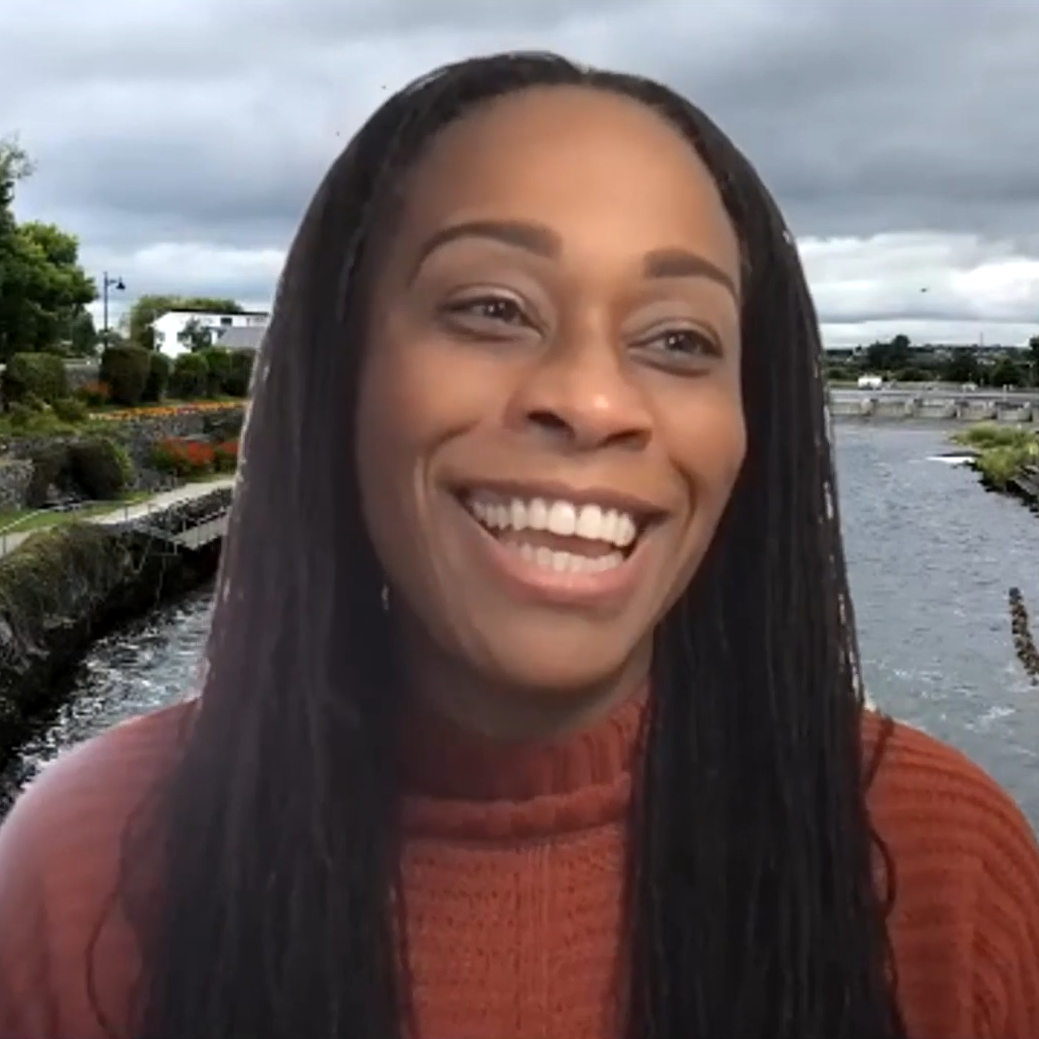
- Botchwey in 2021
- Born: Jamaica
- Education: Harvard University; University of Pennsylvania; University of Virginia
- Scientific career
- Fields: Public affairs, health and environmental policy
- Workplaces: University of Virginia; Georgia Tech; University of Minnesota
- Doctoral advisor: Eugenie L. Birch; John J. DiIulio Jr. Ram A. Cnaan
- Other academic advisors: Heinrich Holland

Nisha D. Botchwey is a Jamaican-American academic administrator specializing in health and environmental policy. She has served as dean of the Humphrey School of Public Affairs at the University of Minnesota since 2022.

== Life ==
Botchwey is from Jamaica. She earned an A.B. in environmental science and public policy from Harvard College in 1997. Her thesis was titled, Eutrophication: The Death Angel Covering Coral Reefs in Montego Bay, Jamaica. Heinrich Holland was her advisor. She completed a master of city and regional planning (1999) and Ph.D. (2003) from the University of Pennsylvania School of Design. Her dissertation was titled, Taxonomy of Religious and Secular Nonprofit Organizations: Knowledge Development and Policy Recommendations for Neighborhood Revitalization. Eugenie L. Birch, John J. DiIulio Jr., and Ram A. Cnaan served as her doctoral advisors.

Botchwey joined the faculty at the University of Virginia in 2003 as an assistant professor in the department of urban and environmental planning. From 2006 to 2009, she was director of its undergraduate studies program. She was promoted to an untenured associate professor in 2009. In 2011, Botchwey earned a M.P.H. from the University of Virginia College of Arts and Sciences. In 2012, she joined Georgia Tech's school of city and regional planning as an untenured associate professor. She was granted tenure in 2015 and promoted to associate dean for academic programs in 2020. In January 2022, she joined the Humphrey School of Public Affairs as its dean and Russell M. and Elizabeth M. Bennett Chair in Excellence in Public Affairs. She is the first immigrant and person of color to serve in the role.Since 2023, she has served as an Advisory Board Member for the African American Leadership Forum.

Recently in 2024, at the Association of Collegiate Schools of Planning event in Seattle, Nisha Botchwey was recognized with the Margarita McCoy award for her contributions to the advancement of women in planning.

== Selected works ==
- Ross, Catherine L.; Orenstein, Marla; Botchwey, Nisha (2014). Health Impact Assessment in the United States. Springer New York. ISBN 978-1-4614-7302-2.
- Botchwey, Nisa; Dannenberg, Andrew L.; Frumkin, Howard, eds. (2022). Making Healthy Places, Second Edition: Designing and Building for Well-Being, Equity, and Sustainability. Island Press. ISBN 978-1-64283-157-3.
