= Cai Shaoqing =

Chinese historian (1933–2019)

- Chinese: 蔡少卿
Transcriptions
Standard Mandarin
- Hanyu Pinyin: Cài Shǎoqīng
- IPA: [tsʰâɪ ʂàʊ.tɕʰíŋ]

Cai Shaoqing
- 蔡少卿
- Born: August 14, 1933; Hexing Township, Changshu, Jiangsu, Republic of China
- Died: November 20, 2019 (aged 86); Nanjing, China
- Occupations: Historian, professor
- Awards: Frederic Milton Thrasher Award; National University of Humanities and Social Sciences Research Outstanding Achievement Award

Academic background
- Education: Nanjing Normal University, Peking University, Nanjing University
- Influences: Shao Xunzheng

Academic work
- Discipline: History of China
- Sub-discipline: Historian of the Warlord Era, late Qing Dynasty, and early Republic of China
- Institutions: Nanjing University
- Notable students: Elizabeth J. Perry
- Main interests: Chinese secret societies
- Notable works: On the Origins of the Tiandihui (关于天地会的起源问题) (1964); Research on the History of the Party in Modern China (中国近代会党史研究) (1987); Chinese Secret Society (中国秘密社会) (1989); Bandits in the Republic of China (民国时期的土匪) (1993)

Cai Shaoqing (Chinese: 蔡少卿; 14 August 1933 – 30 November 2019) was a Chinese historian and professor at Nanjing University, considered a leading authority on the history of Chinese secret societies. He pioneered the research of Tiandihui and other secret societies using Qing dynasty archives and overturned the findings of earlier Republican-era scholars. He also studied the links between the Warlord Era and banditry during the late Qing dynasty and early Republic of China. He received the Frederic Milton Thrasher Award for his research on Chinese secret societies.

== Biography ==
Cai was born on 14 August 1933 in Hexing Township, Changshu (now part of Zhangjiagang) in Jiangsu province of the Republic of China. After graduating from Danan High School of Changshu, be was hired by the school as a teacher. He entered the Department of History of Peking University in 1956, and upon graduation in 1960, he became a teaching assistant to historian Shao Xunzheng while continuing his graduate studies at Peking University.

In 1973, Cai was transferred to the Department of History of Nanjing University, where he taught until retirement in 2003. There he advised more than 80 graduate students and postdoctoral researchers, as well as over 70 international scholars including Elizabeth J. Perry, who later dedicated her book Anyuan: Mining China's Revolutionary Tradition to Cai Shaoqing and Yu Jianrong.

From 1980, Cai was invited to teach at over sixty universities and research institutes in more than ten countries. He was named an "Outstanding Graduate Student Advisor" by the government of Jiangsu province and won the Frederic Milton Thrasher Award for his research on Chinese secret societies.

Cai died on 30 November 2019 in Nanjing, aged 86.

== Contributions ==
Cai is recognized as a leading authority on the history of Chinese secret societies. While still a young scholar, he published the article On the Origins of the Tiandihui (关于天地会的起源问题) in 1964. Using his research on Qing dynasty archives housed in Beijing, a previously neglected source for the topic, Cai advanced a vastly different interpretation of the origins of the Tiandihui (Heaven and Earth Society) and the importance of secret societies in Chinese history. His work is considered to have opened a new chapter of scholarship in the field, but further research was hampered by the Cultural Revolution (1966–1976). After the end of the period, Cai and his former student Qin Baoqi emerged as leaders in the field in China. The work by Cai, Qin and others overturned the findings of earlier Republican-era scholars. They concluded that the Tiandihui was founded in 1761 and not in the early Qing dynasty, and that the roots of the Tiandihui and other secret societies lay in mutual aid and not national politics as previously thought.

Together with Philip Billingsley, Cai pioneered research on the links between the Warlord Era and banditry during the late Qing dynasty and early Republic of China. Rejecting the simplistic view that blamed the social disorder of the era on the moral bankruptcy of the warlords, they studied how population growth, government breakdown, military buildup and other factors contributed to banditry. Deserters from armies turned to banditry to make a living, and banditry in turn fuelled militarization as regional elites created militias to protect their localities.
