= Omega (prison gang) =

Organized crime gang in Singapore

OMEGA
- Years active: 1989-present
- Territory: Singapore
- Ethnicity: Malay
- Activities: extortion, drug trafficking, racketeering
- Rivals: Salakau, Wah Kee, Ang Soon Tong

Omega is a prison gang turned organised crime group based in Singapore. Formed in the old Chia Keng Prison in 1989, Omega is a monoethnic with mainly Malay members. As secret societies were predominantly Chinese in pre- and post-independent Singapore, Omega's strong Malay identity has made it one of the most significant Malay secret societies in the country. The informal prison gang later evolved into a formal organised criminal enterprise, with networks extending beyond Singapore's borders.

== Etymology ==
The acronym "Omega" has multiple meanings, with its most common few being 'Our Men Establish the Greatest Association', 'Orang Melayu Enter Gangster Area' ('Orang Melayu' directly translates to 'Malay people'), and 'Only Malays Enter Gangster Area'. At its initial formation, the main aim of the gang was to establish an alliance of 'Malay brotherhood' in prison and in the illegitimate criminal society. As the group evolved, it gradually transformed into an organised crime unit focused on illicit drug trade and other criminal activities.

== History ==
=== Origins ===
Omega was founded by Yan Bai (also commonly known as 'Abang Bai'; 'Abang' directly translates to 'older brother'), a prisoner held in the now defunct Chia Keng Prison. He was first arrested in 1987 for his involvement in gang activities and drug consumption. He was then sent to the old Chia Keng Prison (1976–1993), whose primary purpose was to hold inmates detained under the Criminal Law (Temporary Provisions) Act of 1995, which permitted the indefinite detention of offenders without trial. According to Yan Bai, he started recruiting for the gang in 1987, in retaliation of the discrimination and injustice Malay inmates had to suffer through in the Chinese dominated environment.

With a Chinese majority in most secret societies, Malays inside and outside of prisons were forced to assume low positions at the bottom of the gang hierarchies. Not only so, but they were also forced to abandon their religion and follow Chinese traditions and practices, such as consuming pork, praying to Chinese gods, attending Chinese festivals, and getting Chinese symbols and emblems tattooed on their bodies. Although such acts were a clear violation of the Muslim faith, these Malay members had no choice but to follow suit for self-preservation, as these were the ways to pledge their allegiance and show their dedication to these Chinese gangs. Hence, Omega's objective was to assert their dominance and power as a Malay Muslim gang, as well as protect their fellow Malay Muslim brothers against the unfair treatment and humiliation from the Chinese secret societies inside and outside of prison.

With these goals, Omega was born, with its founding date selected as 23 September 1989, in honour of Yan Bai's 27th birthday. Apart from Yan Bai, there were 6 other founding members. The seven of them were collective known as the 'seven wonders', with Yan Bai assuming the name of supreme 'wonder'. The 'seven wonders' were the pride and joy of Omega, and were worshipped by the gang members due to their bravery and fighting prowess.

At its inception in 1989, Omega mainly enlisted independent Malay Muslim inmates that were not in any gang, members from pre-existing small-scale Malay groups, as well as members from the Malay Muslim factions of Chinese secret societies, such as Sio Kun Tong, also known as Salakau or 369.

=== Transformation to criminal enterprise ===
The pioneer generation of Omega finished serving their sentences and were released from prison from 1996 to the early 2000s. Upon release, they restructured Omega's internal workings and hierarchies, transforming the group from a prison gang into an organised criminal enterprise. Yan Bai assumed the role of the 'general headman', while the rest of the gang was split into four sections – the northern, eastern, southern and western sectors. Each faction consisted of a hierarchy of members. The highest position of each faction was the 'headman', in charge of at least two territories. Below him, a couple of 'branch headmen' would take charge of on-the-ground activities. Each 'branch headman' were assigned 20 to 30 men for daily operations. Additionally, each sector also had one or a few senior members present to advise its leaders.

With Omega's new identity as an organised criminal syndicate, it became heavily involved in the drug distribution trade from 1996 to the late 2000s, both within and across Singapore's borders into Malaysia. As a precautionary measure, certain Omega factions were split into two specialisations: Omega G (gang) and Omega D (drugs). This distinction was strategically made to prevent the destruction of the entire gang – should the case where some of the members get arrested and brought into questioning by the police, the other specialisation would still be able to escape detection and operate independently.

Other than their focus on the drug distribution business, Omega was also involved in other criminal activities. For instance, from the 1990s to the 2000s, Omega supplied Malay hostesses to pubs and karaoke bars, which generated some income for the gang. However, it did not dive deep into such businesses; Omega seemed to only provide the hostesses, and did not dabble in other businesses at the clubs.

=== Decline ===
Following Omega's deep involvement in the transnational drug distribution networks, many of its major members were arrested by the Singapore Police Force (SPF) and the Central Narcotics Bureau. While Omega had around 2,000 members at its peak in the 1990s and early 2000s, its numbers have fallen to the high hundreds following police raids and arrests.

Yan Bai's own failings similarly contributed to Omega's decline. Yan Bai was repeatedly arrested by the police under the Criminal Law (Temporary Provisions) Act 1995 and for drug consumption charges from the period of 2004 to 2015, for his involvement in gang activities and his relapse into drug addiction.

In present times, it is unclear whether Omega is still operating as a gang. While news speculating its activities and revival would occasionally appear, the Singapore Police Force has strongly refuted such allegations.

== Rules, regulations and code of conduct ==
Yan Bai put into place a set of rules for members to obey – using the five alphabets in 'Omega', the code of conduct were Organisation, Martyrdom, Encroachment, Gallantry and Admittance. Apart from these principles, additional recruitment guidelines followed: membership was only opened to Malay or Muslim males that were either current or former inmates, and they had to be endorsed by one of the 'seven wonders'. Homosexuality was also forbidden.

The key characteristics that Omega members were centred on achieving and upholding were 'fearlessness' and 'fearsomeness'. This meant that they should display courage and bravery in every fight, regardless of the strength of their enemies or the consequent outcome of the fight. This 'fearless' and 'fearsome' identity earned Omega members a reputation in the criminal underworld, and increased the standing of Malay Muslim gang members inside and outside of prison.

Other than fighting for the rights of Malay Muslim inmates, Omega members also placed strong emphasis on establishing a strong sense of Muslim brotherhood and kinship, as well as subscribing to the Islamic doctrine, Fisabilillah, which means 'for the sake of God'.

== Gang identity ==
=== Gang symbol ===
Omega's gang symbol is an uppercase 'Omega' (Ω), the last letter in the ancient Greek alphabet. According to Yan Bai, he chose this symbol as it signified the "last series", indicating that Omega will be the final gang to persist on.

=== Gang number ===
Omega's gang number is "53571", created using the pairing of a covert communication system of hand signs with the alphabetical series' numerical order. For example, when counting with both palms faced up, A assumes the first position (left thumb), B assumes the second position (left index), and so on. Hence, O would assume the number '5', M the number '3', E the number '5' again, G the number '7' and A the number '1'. This converts the gang's name "Omega" into their gang code "53571". The collection of an admission charge (SGD $53.50) and monthly membership fees (SGD $13, derived from 5 + 3 + 5) followed this gang code too.

=== Hand sign ===
Omega's hand sign represents a lowercase 'Psi' (𝛙), the second-last letter of the ancient Greek alphabet. To hand sign this symbol, the thumb and index finger from one hand is extended upwards to form a 'U' shape, with the middle finger of the same hand pointed upwards and positioned in between the two fingers, to visually resemble a '𝛙' symbol.

=== Handshake ===
Omega also has a secret handshake, consisting of three consecutive actions that represents "535" (the first three numbers of the gang code "53571") in each step: (1) doing a normal handshake, where both parties hold each other's hands with all 5 fingers; (2) folding the pinky inwards and keeping the remaining 3 fingers out; and (3) pointing the pinky outwards again, where all 5 fingers resume step 1's position.

== Bibliography ==
- Chia, Joshua Yeong Jia (April 2021). "Chia Keng Prison". www.nlb.gov.sg. National Library Board Singapore. Retrieved September 9, 2024.
- Chong, Chee Kin; Arshad, Arlina (April 7, 2008). "Pan-Causeway drug busters join forces to wipe out gangs". The Straits Times. p. 23.
- "Criminal Law (Temporary Provisions) Act 1955". Singapore Statutes Online. Retrieved September 29, 2024.
- Faizal, Kamal (August 24, 2019). "Is the "Omega" secret society making a comeback in Singapore?". Black Dot Research. Retrieved September 29, 2024.
- Ganapathy, Narayanan (2016). ""Us" and "Them": Ethnic Minority Gangs in Singapore Prisons". Journal of Contemporary Criminal Justice. 32 (3): 264–284. doi:10.1177/1043986216656686.
- Ganapathy, Narayanan (December 21, 2024). Gangs and Minorities in Singapore: Masculinity, Marginalization and Resistance. Great Britain: Bristol University Press. ISBN 978-1529210651.
- Ganapathy, Narayanan; Balachandran, Lavanya (2019). "Minority Gangs in Singapore Prisons: Prisonisation Revisited". Australian & New Zealand Journal of Criminology. 53 (1): 44–64. doi:10.1177/0004865819876674.
- Irwin, Katherine; Umemoto, Karen. "Being Fearless and Fearsome: Colonial Legacies, Racial Constructions, and Male Adolescent Violence". Race and Justice. 2 (1): 3–28. doi:10.1177/2153368711436014.
- Kamaludeen, Mohamed Nasir (2014). "Protected Sites: Reconceptualising Secret Societies in Colonial and Postcolonial Singapore". Journal of Historical Sociology. 29 (2): 232–249. doi:10.1111/johs.12072.
- Kamaludeen, Mohamed Nasir (2014). "Singapore: Malay Gangster". In Barker, Joshua; Harms, Erik; Lindquist, Johan (eds.). Figures of Southeast Asian Modernity (198–200). Honolulu: University of Hawai'i Press.
- Kamaludeen, Mohamed Nasir (2016). "Antipodal Tattooing: Muslim Youth in Chinese Gangs". Deviant Behavior. 37 (8): 952–961. doi:10.1080/01639625.2016.1161456.
- Law, Chiew Mee; Peer, Mohamed Akbur; Sim, Stephanie; Tay, Pin Pin (1993). Singapore 1993. Singapore: Ministry of Information and the Arts.
- Lim, Jessie (November 7, 2022). "Omega secret society member receives jail, caning for role in drug trafficking". The Straits Times. Retrieved September 29, 2024.
- "Police investigating false information on gang activities". Facebook. August 24, 2019. Retrieved September 29, 2024.
