= Organised crime in Singapore =

Prevalent criminal organisations and activities in Singapore

- Founded: 1820
- Founding location: Singapore
- Territory: Active in many parts of Singapore, China, Malaysia, Hong Kong, Taiwan, Fujian
- Ethnicity: Chinese, Cantonese
- Membership: Ghee Hin Kongsi, Hokkiens, Hakka, Teochew
- Criminal activities: Racketeering, drug trafficking, corruption, dacoity, smuggling, entryism, extortion, loan sharking, human trafficking, money laundering, robbery, gambling, bribery, skimming and murder
- Allies: Tiandihui, Triads, Salakau

Organised crime in Singapore has a long history with secret societies such as Ghee Hin Kongsi carrying out their activities in the 19th century. These organised groups hold great relevance to Singaporean modern history. Since 1890, organised groups began fading from Singapore, decline in street organised crime in the past years due to legislation has been put place to ensure authorities suppress the activities of criminal gangs. Contemporary Singapore witnessed a significant rise in other forms of crime —organised cyber-crime.

== Historical background ==
Colonial Singapore Flag from 1946-1952

=== The first secret society group ===
Organised criminal gangs existed in Singapore long before the arrival of the British. Formed in 1820, Heaven and Earth Society (Tiandihui) based in Fujian, an offshoot of the Ghee Hin Kongsi was the first secret group formed in Singapore.

=== British colony of Singapore ===
Organised crime rose steadily in the following years as a result of immigration triggered by the arrival of the British in the 1820s. The mass immigration played a crucial role in the economic development during the colonial era by availing large population for labours. However, the rapid growth in the ethnic Chinese population came with cost as more secret societies were formed. Immigrants formed their own “community” based on the notion of brotherhood generally known as Hui, which loosely translates into a vast family or company. When joining Hui, one had to cut their fingers with a knife, and the blood that dripped down would be added into rice wine, then it would be drunk as a sign of brotherhood.

==== Early 19th century ====
The formation of this secret society (Hui) played an important role to the immigrants from China during the early 19th century. This group was particularly helpful to these Chinese immigrants during their encounters with colonial government officials who were ignorant of the Chinese language and culture. They would take advantage of these situations to lure the Chinese into joining "Hui". They offered a source of livelihood to the immigrants, offered protection and most imperatively presided over activities that united them and gave them a sense of belonging and spiritual fulfilment. The Hui were involved in a sourcing of unskilled native labourers as well as other profit making ventures such as pepper and gambier farming.

At the beginning of the 19th century Hui adopted a clarion call of mutual assistance, bonding and brotherhood and the colonial government's attitude towards the secret society is ambiguous due to political independence and the inability of the colony's administration. However, by mid 19th century their activities had deteriorated sharply creating impressions of disorder and violence.

==== Mid-19th century ====
Organised crime groups were posing huge problems to the routine and security of people, which forced the British authorities to curb the growing problem. These secret societies intensified their criminal activities from 1850s steadily evolving into organised crimes. They started with simple acts of crime extortion, trafficking and opium dealings before expanding to bigger criminal ventures like running illegal gambling dens and brothels. Organised crime groups started to scuffle with other gangs in order to take over their “turf” and threatened other citizens to pay protection money in return for their so-called ‘protection’. The most ferocious organised crime group was Ghee Hin Kongsi; estimated to have 800 members, this group was largely made of the Cantonese. Other secret societies involved in crime include the Hai San, a gang that rivalled the Ghee Hin group in competition for land houses and business opportunities. Major legislative development in the colonial government led to the suppression of secret societies as law enforcement authorities thwarted the activities of organised crime.

== Modern trends ==
In Singapore, just like any other country in the world, organised crime is considered a criminal act. This includes running unlicensed money lending facilities and operating illegal gambling dens, among other crimes. Given the severe penalty attached to organised crime, Singapore records an average low crime rate compared to the rest of the world. However, some smaller groups have come together to form some secret groups that takes after the past secret groups like "Hui". These groups' memberships consist primarily of adolescent teenagers. Singapore has registered an increase in gang related activities in the recent past with drug trafficking being the major organised crime in the recent times owing to its immense profits. Since the 1970s these groups have emerged at different times running various illegal activities and engaging in violent activities in the pursuit of their interests which includes unlicensed money lending and drug trafficking. Salakau gang is also another recent example of organised crime. This group drew its members from the Indians and Malays and made huge amounts of money through engaging in extortion and prostitution. Gang rivalry and conflicts between different gangs is a common phenomenon. Even in the present days, there is still a growing number of rebellious youths who subscribe to the ideologies of gang stars thinking being in a gang makes people look cool. A typical example can be traced back to 1990 where some teenagers in “pseudo street gangs” were obsessed with Salaku believing that such an affiliation was cool. These teenagers would be heard chanting the Salakau slogans in their squabbles without being its group members.

Critical Information Infrastructure (CII) is still considered a primary target for organised cyber criminals in Singapore. This infrastructure includes the Banking and Finance industry which is likely to suffer major losses which may affect the country's economy. An insurance company suffered major losses in 2017 when a group of hackers attacked the company's website leaking personal information for more than 5000 customers.

=== Organised cyber-crime ===
Organised cyber-crime in Singapore has been a threat to both private and public sector including government's security agencies. The cyber-attack on the Ministry of Defence in February 2017 was an example of case where a government agency became a target for cyber criminals. Personal details of military personnel were leaked during the attack carried out by hackers. The attack was thwarted before the hackers could access classified military information. Private businesses have also registered losses as a result of cyber-attacks such as the Wannacry Ransomware in 2017 which compelled victims to send a ransom of particular amount to the criminals

Secret societies have been using online markets to sell illicit items such as drugs and weapons. This sale is always conducted on the dark web, a collection of encrypted websites that cannot be tracked easily by authorities. According to Singapore Anti-Narcotics Association, youths have turned to online markets for drugs such as marijuana. The transactions are carried online through escrow which allows for the payment of contraband. Organised criminal societies have been involved in illicit money lending services on online platforms. These loans are always offered on high rates taking advantage of the victims’ desperation. Since obtaining banks loans is time-consuming and demanding, criminals have resorted to offering loans on the dark web

== Decline of organised crime ==
Since 1890, Singapore has witnessed declining rates of organised crime through the years. This has been made possible by the enactment of strict laws and legislation such as the ‘Societies Ordinance Act’ that spelled severe penalties for the offenders. However, there is no denying that organised gangs still exist and it may not be possible to fully wipe them out. The significant decline in gang related activities is attributable to the reforms that have taken place within the law enforcement agencies. The police force has a branch called the Secret Society Branch (SSB) which is mandated primarily to suppress these gangs and destroy them. Among the strategies they employ in dealing with these gangs include surprise raids on their dens deterring any potential offenders. The Singaporean Criminal law dictates that any person found guilty of a criminal offence involving unlawful society is liable to five years of imprisonment and five strokes of cane. In the event that the crime involves a person with authority or a leader within the group then the penalty could be doubled or even tripled. Additionally, certain offences such as drug trafficking are considered capital offences and could lead to death penalty under the penal code. Young offenders below the age of 21 years who join criminal gangs would be liable to life imprisonment while gang robberies would also attract five years behind bars under the code. Accordingly, strict legislation has been the biggest deterrence of criminal gangs effectively and efficiently reducing crime in the country.

=== Organised Crime Act 2015 ===
The parliament of Singapore is credited for enacting legislation addressing organised crime in the country. The Organised Crime Act 2015 is one of the recent statutes that was designed to help reduce criminal activities by organised gangs. It took full effect in June 2016 having been passed by the parliament in 2015. The law grants power to law enforcement authorities to detect and prevent criminal activities with minimal interference. Under this law, the public prosecutor is allowed to confiscate assets obtained from criminal activities before sentencing following an application from the High Court. This move helps in the investigation of suspected criminals, as they are denied the financial freedom that would jeopardise investigations. Suspected criminals planning to flee overseas using material gains from criminal activities may be apprehended by law enforcement authorities. However, it was worth noting that the public prosecutor has the responsibility to prove that a suspect was involved in criminal activities before being granted permission for civil confiscation.

==== Three preventive orders ====
The Organised Crime Act 2015 also provides for statutory laws that contain preventive orders. These are orders used by the public prosecutor to prevent the likelihood of a suspect engaging in future criminal activities. There are three orders that fall within the preventive orders provided in the act namely disqualification order, financial reporting order and the Organised crime prevention order. The disqualification order restricts suspects from getting involved in the management of companies. If suspects are found guilty, they are automatically disqualified by the court from acting as directors for companies. This order is drawn from the fact that one may use the corporate form as a shield while engaging in criminal activities in the background. The privileges emanating from the limited liability feature of a company may pose a challenge in the investigation of a suspect. Financial reporting order is issued on suspects demanding them to submit their financial reports to relevant authorities. Such orders are issued on individuals serving their sentence and may be extended even after the jail term. The public prosecutor is also legally permitted to demand these reports from suspects who have not been found guilty by the courts. This law prevents the sentenced members of secret societies from funding criminal activities while serving their sentence. Organised crime prevention order grants permission to law enforcement authorities to monitor the activities of suspects including those not found guilty. It has helped reduce organised crime by monitoring the activities of former criminals as well as persons of interest.

==== Opposition from human rights advocate ====
Even though arguments have been made against these laws, Singapore has recorded a sharp decline in the rate of organised crime since 2016. Human rights advocates argue that these laws infringe on the rights of citizens by suppressing their freedom of expression and assembly. The preventive detention permitted by the Criminal Law Act has always been a subject of debate. Critics argue that the warrantless arrest of suspects is subject to abuse by the law enforcement authorities.

== See also ==
- Secret society
- Organized crime
