= Robert E. Park =

American sociologist (1864–1944)

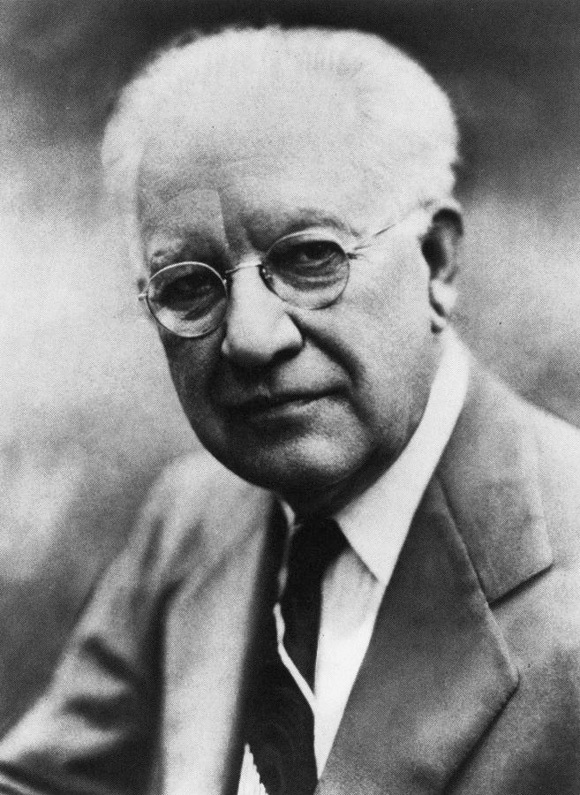
- Born: Robert Ezra Park; February 14, 1864; Harveyville, Luzerne County, Pennsylvania, US
- Died: February 7, 1944 (aged 79); Nashville, Tennessee, US
- Education: University of Minnesota; University of Michigan (BA); Harvard University (MA); Friedrich Wilhelm University; University of Strasbourg; Heidelberg University (PhD)
- Known for: Human ecology; race relations; collective behavior
- Spouse: Clara Cahill
- Children: 4
- Scientific career
- Fields: Sociology; Criminology
- Institutions: University of Chicago; Tuskegee Institute
- Thesis: Masse und Publikum; Eine methodologische und soziologische Untersuchung (1904)
- Doctoral advisors: Wilhelm Windelband; Alfred Hettner
- Doctoral students: Howard P. Becker; Roderick D. McKenzie

Robert Ezra Park (February 14, 1864 – February 7, 1944) was an American urban sociologist who is considered to be one of the most influential figures in early U.S. sociology. Park was a pioneer in the field of sociology, changing it from a passive philosophical discipline to an active discipline rooted in the study of human behavior. He made significant contributions to the study of urban communities, race relations and the development of empirically grounded research methods, most notably participant observation in the field of criminology. From 1905 to 1914, Park worked with Booker T. Washington at the Tuskegee Institute. After Tuskegee, he taught at the University of Chicago from 1914 to 1933, where he played a leading role in the development of the Chicago School of sociology.

Park is noted for his work in human ecology, race relations, human migration, cultural assimilation, social movements, and social disorganization He played a large role in defining sociology as a natural science and challenged the belief that sociology is a moral science. He saw sociology as "...a point of view and a method for investigating the processes by which individuals are inducted into and induced to cooperate in some sort of permanent corporate existence, society."

== Biography ==
=== Childhood and early life ===
Robert E. Park was born in Harveyville, Luzerne County, Pennsylvania, on February 14, 1864, to parents Hiram Asa Park and Theodosia Warner Park. Immediately following his birth, the Park family moved to Red Wing, Minnesota, where he grew up.

Park lived in Red Wing for his first eighteen years. Given the pseudonym "Middle Border" by American novelist Hamlin Garland, Red Wing was a small town of immigrants and Mdewakanton on the bluffs and in the valley along the northern Mississippi River. The rural area is fertile, and Minnesota serves as a corporate outpost for East Coast colonial investment in the American West; Park's hometown was connected to the Twin Cities nearby to the north and Chicago to the east by barge, riverboat, and railroad. Suggesting something of a criminology credential, Park later recalled an encounter with bandit Jesse James, who young Park provided with directions to a local blacksmith's shop. Park has been described as an "awkward, sentimental and romantic boy" whose character led him to develop an interest in writing. He was not considered a promising student, but he liked learning about the people in his town and their ancestries, a niche which would prove to be useful throughout his life. Park graduated high school in 1882, finishing tenth overall in a class of thirteen. Park was interested in attending college after high school, but his father did not consider his son "study material" and did not support the boy's plan. As a result, Robert ran away from home and found a job working on a railroad.

Park's love of writing and concern for social issues, especially issues related to race in cities, led him to become a journalist. Franklin Ford and Park made plans for a newspaper, Thought News, which would report public opinion. Although it was never published, Park still pursued a career as a journalist. From 1887 to 1898, Park worked as a journalist in Detroit, Denver, New York City, Chicago, and Minneapolis. Park's experience as a reporter led him to study the social function of the newspaper, "not as an organ of opinion, but as a record of current events". Towards the end of his newspaper career, Park became disenchanted with the idea that newspaper reporting could alone solved social issues. As a reporter Park learned a great deal about urban communities, which inspired his later sociological endeavors in race relations.

In 1894, Park married Clara Cahill, the daughter of a wealthy Michigan family and had four children: Edward, Theodosia, Margaret and Robert.

=== Education ===
Park first attended the University of Minnesota, where he excelled in his courses. Because of his success at the University of Minnesota, his father offered to invest in furthering Robert's education at the prestigious University of Michigan. Upon entering the University of Michigan, Park decided to transition from studying science to instead studying philology. His professor Calvin Thomas exerted a great influence on him. He challenged him to expand his mind and deeply pursue the concepts presented in his courses.

John Dewey also had a very strong influence on Park during his college year. After Park took Dewey's course on logic his sophomore year of college, he decided to again shift his major, this time to philosophy. Park stated that his interest in going to college has originally been purely practical, originally intending to pursue engineering, but this mindset shifted when he began taking courses which truly intrigued him. He was endlessly fascinated by the notion of exploring the realm of the dubious and unknown rather than focusing on the secure knowledge offered to him in his previous years of education. Upon becoming a student of philosophy Park became, "presently possessed with a devouring curiosity to know more about the world and all that men had thought and done". His future work in the field of sociology, which primary focused on human's behavior in different environments, proves that this exploratory mindset stuck with him for the rest of his life.

At the University of Michigan, Park was involved in the school newspaper, The Argonaut. He held a position of associate editor his junior year and managing editor his senior year. He wrote a satirical piece titled, "A Misapprehension, A Realistic Tale à la Henry James". The connections he formed at The Argonaut would prove helpful in later landing him a job as a reporter at Minneapolis newspaper.

Park graduated from the University of Michigan with a Bachelor of Arts degree (Phi Beta Kappa) in 1887. He attended Harvard University and earned a Master of Arts degree from Harvard in 1899. After graduating, he went to Germany to study Philosophy and Sociology from 1899 to 1900 with Georg Simmel at Friedrich Wilhelm University (nowadays the Humboldt University of Berlin) in Berlin. The three courses Park took with Simmel constituted the majority of his sociological training, and Park proceeded to adopt Simmel's belief that modernity would express itself most tangibly in the city. Simmel's work the Philosophy of Money and relative shorter essays greatly influenced Park's future writing. In Berlin, Park read a book on the logics of social sciences by Russian author Bogdan A. Kistyakovski, who studied under philosopher Wilhelm Windelband. It was this reading that inspired Park to spend a semester at the University of Strasbourg (1900), and then he pursued and received a Doctor of Philosophy in philosophy in 1904 from Heidelberg University under Wilhelm Windelband and Alfred Hettner with a dissertation titled Masse und Publikum; Eine methodologische und soziologische Untersuchung, which translates to Crowd and Public: A methodological and sociological study.

=== Professional life ===
==== Journalism ====
Park began his career with journaling in Minneapolis in 1887. Between then and 1898, he worked with newspapers in Detroit, Denver, New York, and Chicago until attending Harvard in 1898. He believed that his work for newspapers could encourage moral and social change through public outrage. He worked in various journalistic capacities, such as being a police reporter, general reporter, and feature writer and city newspaper editor and wrote muckraking stories and investigative pieces and articles that called for techniques of "scientific reporting," which he later realized was similar to survey research. Park's main focus as a journalist was the daily life of human beings and their routines. His focus was what journalists call "human interest". His experience as a journalist helped shape his view on the world and how people should study it. He was not satisfied with just reporting current events. Park wanted to dive deeper than the surface of these events and understand the underlying long-term significance of the events.

==== Teaching ====
In 1904, Park began teaching philosophy at Harvard as an assistant professor. Park taught there for two years until celebrated educator and author, Booker T. Washington, invited him to the Tuskegee Institute to work on racial issues in the southern United States. Park was offered a position by the Congo Reform Association, but ended up subsequently working for Washington at Tuskegee. Park and Washington originally met through their mutual interest in helping Africans through the Congo Reform Association of which Park was secretary and Washington was vice president. Over the next seven years, Park worked for Washington by doing field research and taking courses. In 1910, Park traveled to Europe to compare US poverty to European poverty. Shortly after the trip, Washington, with the help of Park, published The Man Farthest Down (1913). This publication highlights Parker and Washington's journey to explore Europe in the hopes of finding the man "the farthest down" in order to explore these people were choosing to emigrate and the likeliness of a future change in positions. This led them on a six-week journey through the British Isles, France, Italy, Poland, Denmark, and the Austro-Hungarian Empire.

After the Tuskegee Institute, Park joined the Department of Sociology at the University of Chicago in 1914, first as a lecturer (until 1923), then as a full professor until his retirement in 1933. He continued to study and teach human ecology and race relations. In 1914, Park taught his first course in the Sociology and Anthropology department. The course was titled The Negro in America and it was, "Directed especially to the effects, in slavery and freedom, of the white and black race, an attempt will be made to characterize the nature of the present tensions and tendencies and to estimate the character of the changes which race relations are likely to bring about in the American system". This class was important from a historical perspective because it may have been the first course ever offered at a predominantly white institution that focused exclusively on black Americans. This set a precedent for classes with similar focuses to come.

==== Legacy ====
During Park's time at the University of Chicago, its sociology department began to use the city that surrounded it as a research laboratory. His work, together with that of his Chicago colleagues, such as Ernest Burgess, Homer Hoyt, and Louis Wirth – developed into an approach to urban sociology that became known as the Chicago School. This would become Park's legacy.

After leaving the University of Chicago, Park moved to Nashville, Tennessee. He taught at Fisk University until his death in 1944, at age 79.

During his lifetime, Park became a well-known figure both within and outside the academic world. At various times from 1925, he was president of the American Sociological Association and of the Chicago Urban League, and he was a member of the Social Science Research Council. Park's presidential address for the American Sociological Association was entitled "The Concept of Position in Sociology" and was later published in the Proceedings of the 1925 Annual Meeting.

== Work ==
=== Human ecology ===
Park coined the term human ecology, the study of the relationship between humans and their natural, social, and built environments. The term has been described as an attempt to apply the interrelations of human beings a type of analysis previously applied to the interrelations of plants and animals. Park himself explains human ecology as, "fundamentally an attempt to investigate the processes by which the biotic balance and social equilibrium are disturbed, the transition is made from one relatively stable order to other". Bogardus acknowledges that Park is the father of human ecology, proclaiming, "Not only did he coin the name but he laid out the patterns, offered the earliest exhibit of ecological concepts, defined the major ecological processes and stimulated more advanced students to cultivate the fields of research in ecology than most other sociologists combined."

Park found that a key underpinning of his human ecology is the concept of competition. He believed that it is the primary feature of the biotic level of life. He maintained that human beings restricted in some areas when it comes to competition, while in the plant and animal kingdom it is uninhibited. He maintained that human restriction of competition is what allows our modern concept of society to exist. The essential characteristics of competition are 1) a territorially organized population 2) that is more or less completely rooted in the soil it occupies 3) the individual units living in a relationship are living in a mutually dependent relationship, not a symbiotic one. According to Park's papers regarding this topic, "Dominance" and "Succession: An Ecological Concept", ecological competition can be manifest itself through dominance and succession.

=== Urban ecology ===
While at the University of Chicago, Park continued to strengthen his theory of human ecology. Along with Ernest W. Burgess developed a program of urban research in the sociology department. They also developed a theory of urban ecology, which first appeared in their book Introduction to the Science of Sociology (1922). Using the city of Chicago as their model they proposed that cities were environments like those found in nature. Park and Burgess suggested that cities were governed by many of the same forces of Darwinian evolution that happens in ecosystems. They felt the most significant force was competition. Competition was created by groups fighting for urban resources, like land, which led to a division of urban space into ecological niches. Within these niches people shared similar social characteristics because they were subject to the same ecological pressure.

Competition for land and resources within cities eventually leads to separation of urban space into zones with the more desirable zones imposing higher rent. As residents of a city become more affluent, they move outward from the city center. Park and Burgess refer to this a succession, a term also used in plant ecology. They predicted that cities would form into five concentric rings with areas of social and physical deterioration concentrated in the center and prosperous areas near the city's edge. This model is known as concentric zone theory, it was first published in The City (1925).

=== Race relations ===
Park spent a great deal of time studying race relations with Booker T. Washington while at the University of Chicago. Park contributed significantly to the study of race relations, with Everrett Hughes stating that, "Park probably contributed more ideas for analysis of racial relations and cultural contracts than any other modern social scientist."

Park worked closely with Booker T. Washington and the Tuskegee Institute from 1907 to 1914. While working under Washington, Park's primary interest was the system that had evolved to define Black-White relations in the South. Park said that he learned more about human nature and society while in the South. He says that, "These seven years were for me a sort of prolonged internship during which I gained a clinical and first hand knowledge of a first class social problem . . .[It was from Washington that] I gained some adequate notion of how deep-rooted in human history and human nature social institutions were, and how difficult, if not impossible it was, to make fundamental changes in them by mere legislation or by legal artifice of any sort".

After leaving the Tuskegee Institute, Park joined the University of Chicago where he developed a theory of assimilation, as it pertained to immigrants in the United States, known as the "race relation cycle". The cycle has four stages: contact, conflict, accommodation, and assimilation. The first step is contact followed by competition. Then, after some time, a hierarchical arrangement can prevail – one of accommodation – in which one race was dominant and others dominated. In the end assimilation occurred. Park declared that it is "a cycle of events which tends everywhere to repeat itself" and that it can also be seen in other social processes." He was instrumental in founding the race relations course at Chicago.

=== Critiques ===
Park's theory of conflict has been discredited for a number of reasons, and his theories and contributions in sociology have largely been neglected and forgotten over time.

In the years following the heyday of the Chicago school, Park's reputation took a downfall, and his idea of "symbolic interactionism" was subsequently pushed aside. Park was frequently called a conservative when it came to his theory of the race relations cycle. Critics of Park misinterpreted his theory of race relations, believing that Park meant to assert that progression through the four stages was inevitable; current discourse debates whether Park meant anything of the sort. Within Park's theory of conflict, race relations exists merely as a specific case of this greater theory. Racial groups, or any other kind of group can remain in the conflict stage indefinitely.

Park was further criticized for perceived racist tendencies. Already in his work as an editorial secretary of the Congo Reform Association, Park defended the idea of a noble white civilizing mission to elevate an allegedly savage African population. During his years at the Tuskegee Institute, this nostalgia for European imperialism was complemented by a stereotypical depiction of black peasants in the South as a primitive counterpart of the negative tendencies Park identified in modern city life. These early views on imperialism and race have been called a form of "romantic racism" that strongly influenced his later more elaborated sociological perspectives on the same issues. As already the black Marxist Oliver C. Cox, a student of Park, has warned, this racial essentialism eventually led Park to a mystification of race relations in the Jim Crow era as a natural solution to racial conflict.

In his essay Education in its relation to the conflict and fusion of cultures, Park can be quoted:

The Negro is, by natural disposition, neither an intel-lectual nor an idealist, like the Jew; nor a brooding introspective, like the East African; nor a pioneer and frontiersman, like the Anglo-Saxon. He is primarily an artist, loving of life for its sake. His métier is expression rather than action. He is, so to speak the lady among the races.

Park's belief in inherited racial temperaments, though racist, was somewhat offset by his belief in "social inheritance" working in tandem with "biological inheritance". Put simply, he thought that while some races are more predisposed to certain temperaments, a whole person is also made up of their social qualities. Park also supported Franz Boas' conclusion that there was no scientific evidence to indicate that "Blacks were as a group intellectually inferior to Whites".

The works of sociologists Louis Wirth and Rose Hum Lee illustrate the downfalls of Park's thinking, specifically in relation to adhering to his views on ethnic groups in America. Park's conclusions that the complete assimilation of Jews, Christians, and Chinese folks have occurred was shown within Wirth and Hum Lee's work to be untrue.

== Major works ==
- The Man Farthest Down: A Record of Observation and Study in Europe (with Booker T. Washington), 1912
- Introduction to the Science of Sociology (with E.W. Burgess), 1921
- Old World Traits Transplanted: The Early Sociology of Culture, 1921
- The Immigrant Press and Its Control, 1922
- The City: Suggestions for the Study of Human Nature in the Urban Environment, 1925
- Proceedings: The Concept of Position in Sociology Proceedings, 1925
- The University and the Community of Races, 1932
- Cultural Conflict and the Marginal Man, 1937
- An Outline of the Principles of Sociology, 1939
- American Sociology: The Story of Sociology in the United States through 1950, 1951
- Human Communities: The City and Human Ecology, 1952
- Societies, 1955

== Impact ==
Park's impact on the field of sociology is palpable yet often goes unrecognized. The majority of the sociologists born in the nineteenth century borrowed and concentrated in other fields and their work was considered sociological after the fact. Park was one such sociologist, with much of his interests originating in philosophy and then evolving into what we consider to be modern sociology when he began to focus on studying Chicago. His work led to the development of the Chicago school in sociology. Park along with fellow Chicago School sociologists Ernest Burgess, William I. Thomas, George Herbert Mead, and Louis Wirth created a theoretical basis for sociology which emphasized the more methodological approach which we recognize today. The school produced many studies on city life, including ones on Polish immigrants, gangs, and Jewish ghetto life. It has been noted that Park and his students employed a 'moving camera' approach to their studies of urban life, attempting to capture city dwellers in their natural modes of life. The Chicago school of thought regarding urban ecology still guides much of the work conducted in this field today. Additionally, Erving Goffman, who is considered to be the most influential sociologist of the twenty-first century, embraced the legacy of Park by adopting more qualitative methods when constructing predictive empirical science in contrast to positivist sociological trends.

== Bibliography ==
- 1903: Masse und Publikum. Eine methodologische und soziologische Untersuchung (Ph.D. thesis) publ. Berlin: Lack & Grunau, 1904
- 1912: The Man Farthest Down: a Record of Observation and Study in Europe with Booker T Washington, New York: Doubleday
- 1921: Introduction to the Science of Sociology (with Ernest Burgess) Chicago: University of Chicago Press
- 1921: Old World Traits Transplanted: the Early Sociology of Culture with Herbert A Miller, & Kenneth Thompson, New York: Harper & Brothers
- 1922: The Immigrant Press and Its Control New York: Harper & Brothers
- 1925: The City: Suggestions for the Study of Human Nature in the Urban Environment (with R. D. McKenzie & Ernest Burgess) Chicago: University of Chicago Press
- 1928: Human Migration and the Marginal Man, American Journal of Sociology 33: 881–893
- 1932: The University and the Community of Races Hawaii: University of Hawaii Press
- 1932: The Pilgrims of Russian-Town The Community of Spiritual Christian Jumpers in America, by Pauline V. Young Ph.D. with an Introduction by Robert E. Park, Chicago: University of Chicago Press
- 1937: Cultural Conflict and the Marginal Man in Everett V Stonequist, The Marginal Man, Park's Introduction, New York: Charles Scribner's Sons
- 1939: Race relations and the Race Problem; a Definition and an Analysis with Edgar Tristram Thompson, Durham, NC: Duke University Press
- 1939: An Outline of the Principles of Sociology, with Samuel Smith, New York: Barnes & Noble, Inc
- 1940: Essays in Sociology with C W M Hart, and Talcott Parsons et al., Toronto: University of Toronto Press
- 1950: Race and Culture, Glencoe Ill: The Free Press, ISBN 978-0-02-923780-9
- 1952: Human Communities: the City and Human Ecology Glencoe, Ill: The Free Press
- 1955: Societies, Glencoe Ill: The Free Press
- 1967: On Social Control and Collective Behavior, Chicago: University of Chicago Press, ISBN 978-1-135-54381-5
- 1969: Human Migration and the Marginal Man. in The Classic Essays on the Culture of Cities. Ed. Richard Sennett. New York: Appleton-Century-Crofts, 1969, pp. 131–142
- 1972: The Crowd and the Public and Other Essays, Heritage of Society
- 1974: The Collected Papers of Robert Ezra Park: Volumes 1,2, & 3. Arno Press ISBN 978-0-405-05517-1

== See also ==
- Social disorganization theory
- Everett Stonequist
- Frederic Thrasher
- The Chicago School
