= Wah Kee =

Wah Kee 華記
- Founding location: Chinatown, Singapore, Singapore, Malaysia
- Years active: 18??-present (Organized crime)
- Territory: Singapore-Malaysia
- Ethnicity: Chinese and Malay/Indian
- Activities: gambling, prostitution, scamming, heroin trafficking
- Rivals: 24,36,08, Omega

Wah Kee (华记 Huá Jì) is a secret society based in Malaysia and Singapore since the nineteenth century.

== History ==
According to the History of Wah Kee, Wah Kee (华记) was created in Singapore by Sū Guǎnghuá (苏广华). His associate Zhào Guǎnghéng (赵广恒) created Guǎng Jì (广记) in Guangzhou, China, while Guān Fúshèng (关福胜) created Shèng Jì (胜记) in Thailand, and Zhāng Xióngjié (张雄杰) created Jié Jì (杰记) in Vietnam.

In the 1950s, they operated openly in the area around Bentong and placed a member on the local council of Jemaluang. During this time, they were commonly associated with the Malaysian Chinese Association, with politician D. R. Seenivasagam going so far as to describe this connection in Parliament.

In recent times, they are mainly in the Selangor, Kuala Lumpur, Melaka, Penang, Pahang, Negeri Sembilan, Sarawak, Perak and other areas. In Singapore, Wah Kee is mainly in the Chinatown area. The triad also have some branches in Australia, Thailand, Vietnam, China, Hong Kong, the United States, Canada and New Zealand.

The Philippine Center on Transnational Crime has stated that while the Wah Kee do not operate as a traditional triad per se, they are heavily involved in heroin trafficking in the region.

== See also ==
- Secret society
