= Edgar T. Thompson =

American historian

Edgar Tristram Thompson (September 13, 1900 – April 22, 1989) was an American sociologist and expert on the society that surrounded plantations in the United States.

Thompson was born in Dillon, South Carolina in 1900. He was raised on his father's small plantation right at the border of North and South Carolina. He would eventually become an authority on the historical sociology of the plantation and its role in shaping European colonization of the New World. He studied sociology at the University of Chicago under Robert Park.

His doctoral dissertation, entitled The Plantation, helped to redirect research on the plantation away from climatic and racial theories.

Thompson later taught sociology at Duke University in North Carolina from 1937 until 1970.
