= Secret societies in Singapore =

Secret societies in Singapore have been largely eradicated as a security issue in the city-state. However many smaller groups remain today which attempt to mimic societies of the past. The membership of these societies is largely adolescent.

Despite fading from contemporary Singaporean society, these secret societies hold great relevance to Singapore's modern history. The founding of the city-state in 1819 saw the arrival of thousands of Chinese, thereby transplanting to Singapore social systems already present in China itself. Although the secret societies were commonly associated with violence, extortion and vice, they also played a part in building a social fabric for early Chinese immigrants in Singapore. They were given leeway to control the Chinese populace due to the hands-off policy adopted by the British colonial government, who hoped to create stability.

== History ==
The secret societies formed in Singapore can be traced to mid-18th century Fujian province in China, with the local offshoots adopting an organisational structure mirroring the parent organisation. The Hongmen, the first secret society to be established in Singapore, traced its origins to the Tiandihui in Fujian.

== Policing secret societies ==
Despite their founding principles of mutual assistance and bonding, secret societies have, over time, come to conjure up impressions of violence and disorder. This association, perhaps exaggerated, has been encouraged by law enforcement officers since their formation in the colonial era. This perception was strengthened by several factors, including the inability of the colony's administration to control their activities, the branding of arrested society members as "criminal gangsters" by the media and an upsurge in violent crime in the 19th Century sparked by a few society members. These factors came together during the same period in which the country was trying to gain a foothold fresh from having attained political independence it did not foresee. Several important riots in Malayan history had prompted the colonial government to respond. These riots include the Penang Riots of 1867 (which involved the Ghee Hin) and the Post Office Riots of 1876. The Societies Ordinance of 1889 was introduced as an attempt at suppression.

== Reasons for the decline ==
In the early 19th century, secret societies posed a significant threat to law and order in Singapore. The early Chinese immigrants' clandestine activities and occasional turf wars proved too much of a problem for the British authorities. The authorities were therefore obliged to curb the growing issue. A number of methods were employed to check the growth of these societies, resulting in their decline.

=== Singapore becoming a Crown Colony ===
The 1867 transfer of authority over Singapore from the Indian Government to the colonial office in London is considered by most to be the most important factor that helped the British colonial government check the growth of secret societies. The elevation of Singapore to a Crown Colony meant that London was willing to spend money and resources and provide proper administrators, which it had previously been unprepared to do. Thus, Singapore was given a significantly larger priority, and only with the transfer of power could the authorities initiate the following changes.

=== Legislation of strict laws ===
The legislation of strict laws had an enormous effect in checking the growth of the secret societies. Two significant laws were passed in the 1860s. The first was the Peace Preservation Act (also known as the banishment act) of 1867, which gave the colonial government the power to detain and deport Chinese immigrants who were convicted of crime. This was a major weapon against the secret societies, as it created fear and deterred immigrants from becoming members. With this law, the power of these societies was significantly curtailed. In 1869, the Peace Preservation Act was amended, and the Dangerous Societies Suppression Ordinance was also enacted. This required that secret societies be registered. By requiring only the societies to be registered, and not the individual members, the law incentivised people to provide insight on the societies' actual strength. In the first round of registrations, 10 secret societies, 618 office bearers, and 12,371 members were registered. This ordinance also accorded the colonial government the power to inspect any society that was deemed dangerous to public peace. This way the colonial government could closely monitor the societies' activities. This further dissuaded Chinese immigrants from joining these societies, causing a decline in their influence in Singapore by the end of the 19th century.

=== Improvements to police force ===
In 1843, there were only 133 police personnel. Even if the army of 595 men was brought in, they were still no match for the Chinese community consisting of 32,132 people (most of whom were secret society members). Thomas Dunman, the first Commissioner of Police, wrote that his police force was underpaid and drew salaries lower than the average Chinese labourer. By 1865, there were 385 policemen to 50,043 Chinese, but the ratio of policemen to Chinese was still too few to be effective. This was compounded by the fact that no one in the police force was qualified to deal with the Chinese. The officers' posts were held by Europeans while Indians made up the rank and file. No Chinese were employed because of their possible dealings with secret societies. Thus, the police force was ignorant of the language and ways of the Chinese, which was also the most volatile immigrant community at the time. So ineffective was the police force that the wealthy had to hire private watchmen and carry personal arms to ensure their own safety.

However, after Singapore became a Crown Colony in 1867, large improvements were made to the local police force. This was an important factor that helped check the growth of secret societies. The police force started to receive more funding, better equipment, and proper training. All these made the police force a much more effective force than it had been under the rule of the British. Even more significant was the hiring of Chinese police officers who could understand and deal with the problems associated with the secret societies.

=== Establishment of Chinese Protectorate ===
The establishment of the Chinese Protectorate in 1877 is yet another factor that led to the societies' growth being checked. The first Chinese Protector, William Pickering, maintained close contact with the Chinese immigrant community and provided them with assistance. Being fluent in written and spoken Mandarin as well as in other varieties of Chinese, Pickering looked after the welfare of the newly arrived immigrants, prevented abuse, and kept track of the numbers leaving and arriving. Pickering also licensed special depots. To qualify for a licence, the depots required a constant and plentiful supply of water and good ventilation. He also visited the immigrants to ask them in person what their connections in Singapore were, making sure they had someone to turn to during their stay.

This establishment of the Chinese Protectorate let the British sustain, for the first time in the history of Singapore, a satisfactory relationship with the Chinese community. Pickering was known affectionately as daren (大人), Chinese for 'Sir'. The Protectorate effectively became a legitimate alternative where Chinese immigrants could come and try to solve their problems legally, instead of going to the societies for a typically violent resolution. It thus helped to deter many new immigrants from increasing the membership of secret societies.

== See also ==
- Secret societies in colonial Singapore
- Salakau
- Ang Soon Tong
- Ah Kong
- Ghee Hin Kongsi
- Chung Keng Quee
- Hai San Secret Society
- List of Chinese criminal organizations
- Tan Kim Ching
- Triad (underground society)
