= Ruth Shonle Cavan =

American sociologist (1896–1993)

Ruth Shonle Cavan (August 28, 1896 – August 25, 1993) was an American sociologist based at the University of Chicago. She specialized in deviance and criminology and was a leader of the Chicago school of sociology. According to Moyer (1989):

Ruth Shonle Cavan is recognized by most current criminologists as an extraordinary writer with analytical skills and the ability to synthesize the research in the field. One of the major strengths of her writings is her ability to build on the theoretical perspectives and methodologies of the Chicago School and to use other perspectives and methodologies when appropriate....[M]ost current criminologists only regard Cavan as a great textbook writer.

== Recognition ==
Since 1997, the American Society of Criminology has given the Ruth Shonle Cavan Young Scholar Award annually to a distinguished young researcher in the field of criminology.
