= The Man Farthest Down =

1911 book by Booker T. Washington

The Man Farthest Down: A Record of Observation and Study in Europe is a 1912 book written by Booker T. Washington and Robert E. Park. It examines the conditions of the working class in Europe. They authors visited various cities and observed the living conditions of the urban poor. They mainly looked in the industrial centers and marginalized groups in Europe such as Jewish people and Romani people (termed "Gypsies"). Through their travels, Washington aimed to better understand poverty in Europe and compare it to the conditions faced by African Americans in the Southern United States after slavery.

== Background ==
Through their observations and research, Washington and Park aimed to shed light on the struggles faced by the working class in Europe and to offer insights into how these issues might be addressed. The book is also significant in its representation of the collaboration between a prominent African-American leader (Washington) and a white sociologist (Park) during a time of heightened racial tensions in the United States.

The book begins, "On 20 August, 1910, I sailed from New York City for Liverpool, England. I had been given a leave of absence for two months from my work at Tuskegee, on condition that I would spend that time in some way that would give me recreation and rest. Now I have found that almost the only comfortable and satisfactory way for me to rest is to find some new kind of work or occupation. I determined therefore to carry out a plan I had long had in mind of making myself acquainted with the condition of the poor and working classes in Europe, particularly in those regions from which an ever – increasing number of immigrants are coming to our country each year."

== Themes ==
=== Comparing Europe and the South After Reconstruction ===
One Major theme in The Man Farthest Down is the comparison between poverty in Europe and the conditions of African Americans in the Southern United States after the Reconstruction. Booker T. Washington describes the lives of poor and working-class people in Europe and compares them to Black communities in the South. Throughout the text Washington suggests that despite facing racism and inequality, African Americans in the South had more opportunity for economic improvement than some of the poorest populations in Europe. According to historian Robert H. Brinkmeyer Jr., these comparisons reflect Washingtons broader goal of supporting his ideas about education, labor, and social progress.By comparing the two places, Washington emphasizes his belief that economic opportunity and practical education were key to improving living conditions.

=== Education and Industrial Training ===
Another important theme in The Man Farthest Down is the focus on education and industrial training as a way to improve social conditions. Booker T. Washington emphasizes the importance of practical skills like farming and manual labor, as a way for poor communities to become more independent and economically stable. According to scholar Gary Totten, Washington presents education and steady work as the main solutions to poverty which highlighted how learning useful skills can lead to progress. Totten also notes that Washington focuses more on labor and training than on political or social issues, showing his belief that economic improvement was the most important step toward achievement.

=== Rural vs. Urban Life ===
The next important theme in The Man Farthest Down is the contrast between rural and urban life. Booker T. Washington would describe cities in Europe like London, as places with overcrowding, poverty, and limited opportunities for the working class. In contrast he points out that rural areas offer more stability and opportunities for work. A lot of those opportunities came from agriculture. According to historian Robert H. Brinkmeyer Jr., Washington uses these comparisons to support his belief that rural life and agricultural labor provide a better path for improvement than urban environments. This contrast reinforces his broader argument that practical skills are key to social and economic progress.

=== Limits of Washington's Approach ===
Another important theme is the limits of Booker T. Washington's approach to racial progress. Washington encouraged African Americans to focus on jobs, skills, and education instead of trying to directly fight segregation and discrimination. This strategy helped build institutions like Tuskegee Institute and created opportunities for some Black Americans in the South. However, historian Dickson D. Bruce Jr. points out that this approach also had limits because it didn't directly challenge racism or push for equal rights. With that being said, Washington's ideas helped in some ways but they didn't fully solve the bigger problems African Americans were facing after the reconstruction.
