= Louis Wirth =

American sociologist (1897-1952)

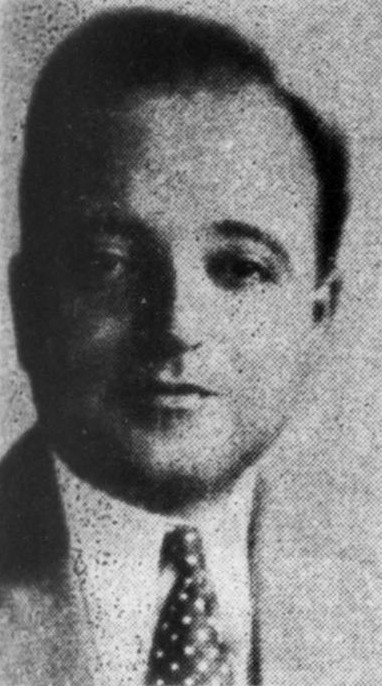
- Louis Wirth c. 1948
- Born: August 28, 1897; Gemünden, Rhine Province, Prussia
- Died: May 3, 1952 (aged 54); Buffalo, New York
- Education: University of Chicago
- Scientific career
- Fields: Sociology
- Academic advisors: Robert E. Park; Ernest Burgess; W. I. Thomas; Albion Woodbury Small

Louis Wirth (August 28, 1897 – May 3, 1952) was an American sociologist and member of the Chicago school of sociology. His interests included city life, minority group behavior, and mass media, and he is recognised as one of the leading urban sociologists. He spent most of his academic career at the University of Chicago.

He was the first president of the International Sociological Association (1949–1952) and the 37th president of the American Sociological Association (1947).

== Early life ==
Louis Wirth was born in the small village of Gemünden in the Hunsrück, Germany. He was one of seven children born to Rosalie Lorig (1868–1948, from Butzweiler/Eifel) and Joseph Wirth. Gemünden was a pastoral community, and Joseph Wirth earned a living as a cattle dealer. The family was Jewish and both of his parents were religiously active.

Wirth migrated in 1911 at the age of 14 to the United States where he lived with his older sister at his uncle's home in Omaha, Nebraska in 1911. Wirth completed high school in Omaha. He was a social worker with the Bureau of Personal Service in Chicago before entering academia. He earned a Ph.B. degree in 1919, M.A. degree in 1925, and Ph.D. degree in 1926, all from the University of Chicago. He was influenced by Robert E. Park.

== Research ==
He was a part of Chicago School of Sociology. After completing his PhD at the University of Chicago, he was on the staff at the university. He was appointed at Tulane University over the period 1928–1929, but returned to University of Chicago after that. He became assistant professor at the University of Chicago in 1931, associate professor in 1932 and full professor in 1940.

His interests included city life, minority group behaviour and mass media and he is recognised as one of the leading urban sociologists. Wirth's major contribution to social theory of urban space was a classic essay Urbanism as a Way of Life, published in the American Journal of Sociology in 1938. In this essay Wirth used Weber's notion of the ideal type, seeing the urban and the rural as constituting two distinct types of community at opposite ends of a continuum.

His research was mostly concerned with how Jewish immigrants adjusted to life in urban America, as well as the distinct social processes of city life. Wirth was a supporter of applied sociology, and believed in taking the knowledge offered by his discipline and using it to solve real social problems.

Wirth writes that urbanism is a form of social organization that is harmful to culture, and describes the city as a "Substitution of secondary for primary contacts, the weakening of bonds of kinship, the declining social significance of the family, the disappearance of the neighborhood and the undermining of traditional basis of social solidarity". Wirth was concerned with the effects of the city upon family unity, and he believed urbanization leads to a "low and declining urban reproduction rates ... families are smaller and more frequently without children than in the country". According to Wirth, marriage tends to be postponed, and the proportion of single people is growing, leading to isolation and less interaction.

But Wirth also stressed the positive effects of city life: "The beginning of what is distinctively modern in our civilization is best signalized by the growth of great cities"; "metropolitan civilization is without question the best civilization that human beings have ever devised"; "The city everywhere has been the center of freedom and toleration, the home of progress, of invention, of science, of rationality" or: "the history of civilization can be written in terms of the history of cities".

The social understanding of minority groups that Wirth obtained first-hand as a Jewish immigrant in America, can be applied to understanding the problems of other minority groups in society, such as ethnic minorities, the disabled, homosexuals, women and the elderly, all of whom have also suffered, and/or continue to suffer prejudice, discrimination, and disenfranchisement from the dominant members of a host society. It is in this respect that Wirth's work still rewards detailed study even seventy years after his original investigations.

A good example of Wirth's work, which includes a comprehensive bibliography, is On Cities and Social Life, published in 1964.

== Personal life ==
Soon after arriving in the United States in 1911, Louis met and married Mary Bolton. The couple had two daughters, Elizabeth (Marvick) and Alice (Gray).

He died of a heart attack shortly after giving a lecture at the University of Buffalo in 1952.

== Bibliography ==
- (1928): The Ghetto. Chicago
- (1936): Preface to "Ideology and Utopia", by Karl Mannheim. In:Shils, E.;Wirth, L. (ed.), Ideology and Utopia, by Karl Mannheim, NY, p. XIII-XXXI
- (1936): Types of Nationalism. In: AJS, Vol. 41, no.6, May, p. 723–737
- (1937): The Urban Mode of Life. In: New Horizons in Planning. Chicago, p. 23–30
- (1938): Urbanism As A Way of Life. in: AJS 44, p. 1–24
- (1939): Social Interaction: The Problem of the Individual and the Group. In: AJS, Vol. 44, May, p. 965–979
- (1940): Ideological Aspects of Social Disorganization. In: American Sociological Review, Vol. 5, no.4, p. 472–482
- (1940): The Urban Society and Civilization. In: Wirth, Louis (ed.), Eleven Twenty Six: A Decade of Social Science Research, p. 51–63
- (1941): Morale and Minority Groups. In: AJS, Vol. 47, no.3, November, p. 415–433
- (1941): The Present Position of Minorities in the United States. In: Studies in Political Science and Sociology. Philadelphia, p. 137–156
- (1944): Race and Public Policy. In: Scientific Monthly, Vol. 58, April, p. 302–312
- (1945): Group Tension and Mass Democracy. In: American Scholar, Vol. 14, No.2, p. 231–235
- (1945): Human Ecology. In: AJS, Vol. 50, no.6, May, p. 483–488
- (1945): The Problem of Minority Groups. In: Linton, Ralph (ed.), The Science of Man in the World Crisis, New York; p. 347–372
- (1946): A Sociologist Looks at the Community. In: Wirth, Louis; et al. (ed.), Community Planning for Peacetime Living. Stanford, Calif.: p. 3–89
- (1947): American Sociology 1915–1947. In: AJS. Index to Volumes 1–52, 1895–1947, Chicago; p. 273–281
- (1947): Ideas and Ideals as Sources of Power in Modern World. In: Bryson, L. et al. (ed.), Conflicts of Power in Modern Culture. NY, p. 499–508
- (1948): Consensus and Mass Communication. In: American Sociological Review Vol. 13, no.1, February, p. 1–15
- (1948): World Community, World Society, and World Government. In: Wright, Quincy (ed.), The World Community, Chicago; p. 9–20
- (1951): The Significance of Sociology. In: International Social Science Bulletin (UNESCO), Vol. 3, no.2, Summer, p. 197–202
- (1956): Community Life and Social Policy. Marvick, Elizabeth Wirth/Reiss, Jr. Albert J. (ed.), Chicago/London
- (1964): On Cities and Social Life. Reiss, A. J. (ed.), Chicago/London
- Reiss, Albert J.jr. (1964): "Introduction", Sociology as a Discipline. In: Wirth, Louis (1964)

== See also ==
- Marginalization
- Robert E. Park
