= Yu Jianrong =

Chinese sociologist (born 1962)

Yu Jianrong (Chinese: 于建嵘; pinyin: Yú Jiànróng, born 1962) is a Chinese sociologist who researches rural development at the Chinese Academy of Social Sciences.

In 2011, he started a microblog account for Internet users to post pictures of children begging in cities to help connect them with their parents.

In 2012 Yu was reported to have made broad proposals for political and economic reform, “10-Year Outline of China’s Social and Political Development”.

In November 2012, Foreign Policy named Yu one of its 2012 Top 100 Global Thinkers "for daring to be specific about how to change China".
