= Roderick D. McKenzie =

Canadian-American sociologist

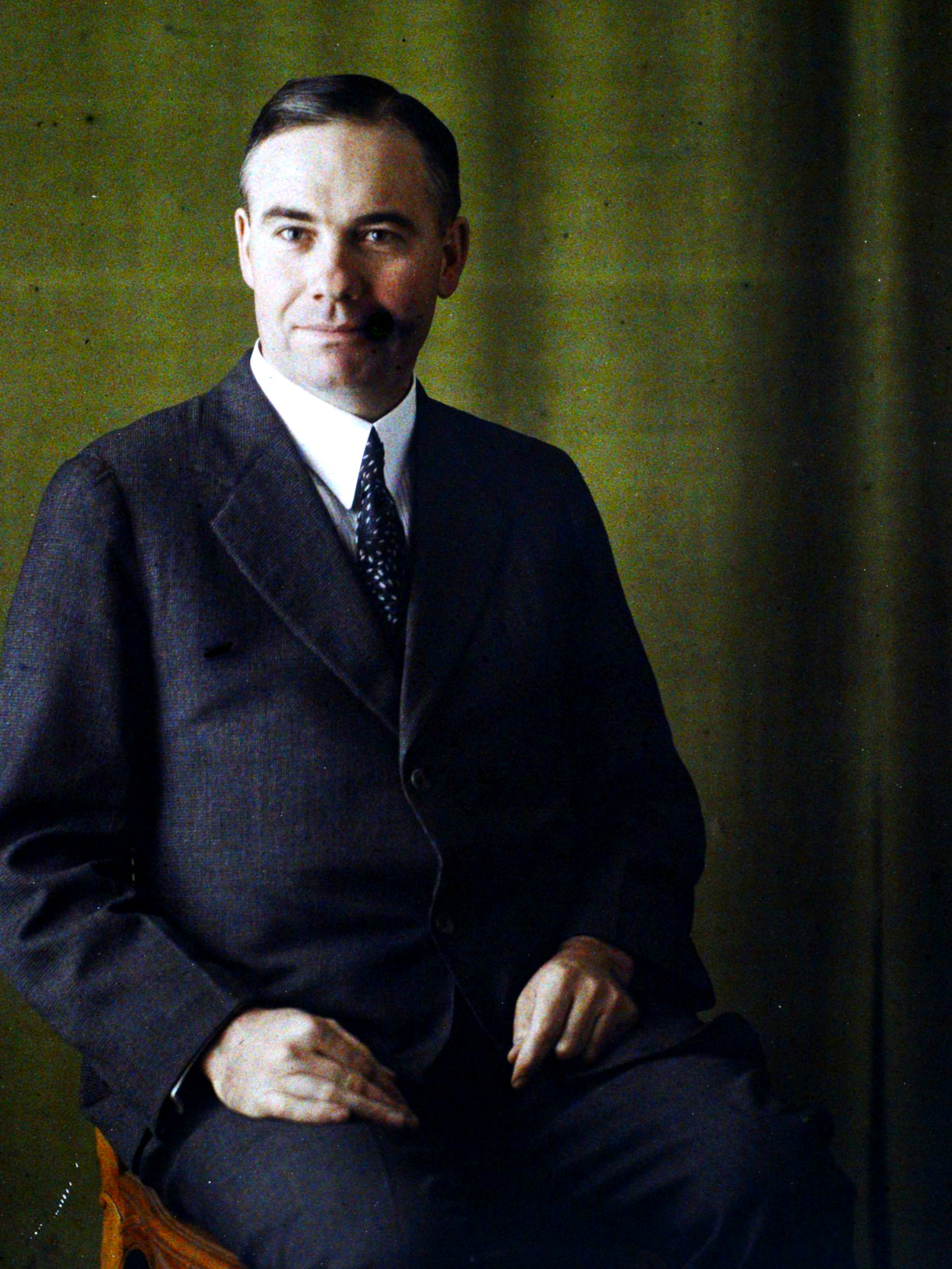
- Autochrome portrait by Auguste Léon, 1921
- Born: Roderick Duncan McKenzie; February 3, 1885; Carman, Manitoba, Canada
- Died: 3 May 1940 (aged 55); Ann Arbor, Michigan, US
- Citizenship: Canadian; American
- Occupation: Sociologist
- Known for: The Neighborhood: A Study of Local Life in the City of Columbus, Ohio.; On Human Ecology
- Spouse: Eva Irene Bissett

Academic background
- Education: University of Manitoba (A.B., 1912); University of Chicago (Ph.D., 1920)
- Thesis: The Neighborhood: A Study of Local Life in the City of Columbus, Ohio. (1923)

Academic work
- Institutions: Manitoba Agricultural College(1912–1913); Ohio State University (1915–1919); University of West Virginia (1919–1920); University of Washington (1920–1930); University of Michigan (1930-?)

Roderick Duncan McKenzie (3 February 1885 – 3 May 1940) was a Canadian-American sociologist, who became head of the sociology department at the University of Michigan. McKenzie served as the 2nd vice-president of the American Sociological Association (ASA) in 1932–1933, and was a charter member of the Sociological Research Association.

== Early life ==
Roderick McKenzie was born in the small agricultural town of Carman, Manitoba, on February 3, 1885, to Katherine Stevenson and John McKenzie. He attended the Winnipeg schools and then earned his A.B. degree at the University of Manitoba in 1912.

== Career ==
In 1912 McKenzie accepted a teaching position at Manitoba Agricultural College. In 1913 he began graduate work in sociology at the University of Chicago. During his graduate work, he held appointments as instructor at Ohio State University (1915–1919) and the University of West Virginia (1919–1920). In 1921 he received his Ph.D. from Chicago, under Robert E. Park, with a thesis, The Neighborhood: A Study of Local Life in the City of Columbus, Ohio, which was published in 1923.

He was appointed to a position at the University of Washington where he eventually become the chair of the sociology department. He was the Washington state director for Pacific Coast Survey of Race Relations from 1924 to 1925.

From 1930 until his death in 1940, McKenzie served as head of the Department of Sociology at the University of Michigan. During that time he was enlisted by president Herbert Hoover to research urban trends for The President's Research Committee on Social Trends. His research for that project was published as The Rise of Metropolitan Communities.
