= Frederic Thrasher =

Frederic Milton Thrasher (1892–1962) was a sociologist at the University of Chicago. He was a colleague of Robert E. Park and was one of the most prominent members of the Chicago School of Sociology in the 1920s.

Thrasher was born in Shelbyville, Indiana in 1892. He graduated B.A. from DePauw University in 1916 in social psychology, then did an MA in 1918 at Chicago with a thesis on "The Boy Scout Movement as A Socializing Agency." He then took a PhD in Chicago in 1926, on Gangs. Thrasher's most famous work: The Gang: a study of 1313 gangs in Chicago, was published in 1927. It said that "neighborhoods in transition are breeding grounds for gangs." Thrasher’s work on gangs was one of a series of outstanding doctoral studies completed under Robert E. Park’s direction in the "golden era" of the University of Chicago Sociology Department.

"Isolation is common to almost every vocational, religious or cultural group of a large city. Each develops its own sentiments, attitudes, codes, even its own words, which are at best only partially intelligible to others." (Thrasher, 1927)

In the 1930s he then moved to New York City, where he taught at the Steinhardt School of Education of New York University, becoming Professor of educational sociology and retiring in 1959. While there he initiated a media studies programme where he began a series of studies of the effects of motion pictures on children. His courses on the subject were path breaking, including a course, begun in 1934, named “The Motion Picture: Its Artistic, Educational and Social Aspects.” He also served widely as a consultant to groups concerned with motion pictures, crime, prison reform, and prevention of juvenile delinquency.

"An immigrant colony...is itself an isolated social world...the gang boy moves only in his own universe and other regions are clothed in nebulous mystery...he knows little of the outside world." (Thrasher, 1927)

== Publications ==
- 1927: The Gang: A Study of 1,313 Gangs in Chicago, University of Chicago Press, ISBN 9780226799308
- 1931: "Social Attitudes of Superior Boys in an Interstitial Community" In K. Young (ed) Social Attitudes. New York: Henry Holt (1931): 236-264.
- 1933: Juvenile delinquency and crime prevention. Journal of Educational Sociology, 6, 500-509
- 1935: Young Lonigan: A Boyhood in Chicago Streets by James T Farrell, with an Introduction by Frederic M. Thrasher. Vanguard Books. First edition, with an additional Introduction by Robert Morss Lovett
- 1946: Okay for Sound: How the Screen Found its Voice, New York: Duell, Sloan and Pearce
- 1949: "The Comics and Delinquency: Cause or Scapegoat," 23 J. Educ. Sociology 195 (1949)
- 1954: “Do the Crime Comic Books Promote Juvenile Delinquency?” The Congressional Digest, 33(12), December

== See also ==
- Chicago school (sociology)
- Robert E. Park
