= Hongmen =

Chinese fraternal organisation

- 洪門
- Founded: 1761
- Founders: Ti Xi; Li Amin; Zhu Dingyuan; Tao Yuan
- Founding location: Fujian, Qing dynasty
- Membership: 300,000

Hongmen

Hongmen
- Traditional Chinese: 洪門
- Simplified Chinese: 洪门
- Literal meaning: Hong Gate, Vast Gate, Floodgate
Transcriptions
Standard Mandarin
- Hanyu Pinyin: Hóngmén
- Wade–Giles: Hung^{2}-men^{2}
Yue: Cantonese
- Jyutping: Hung4 Mun4
Southern Min
- Hokkien POJ: Hông-mn̂g

Tiandihui (former name)
- Traditional Chinese: 天地會
- Simplified Chinese: 天地会
- Literal meaning: Heaven and Earth Society
Transcriptions
Standard Mandarin
- Hanyu Pinyin: Tiāndìhuì
- Bopomofo: ㄊㄧㄢ ㄉㄧˋ ㄏㄨㄟˋ
- Wade–Giles: T'ien^{1}-ti^{4}-hui^{4}
Yue: Cantonese
- Jyutping: Tin1 Dei6 Wui2
Southern Min
- Hokkien POJ: Thian-tē-hōe or Thian-tōe-hōe

Sanhehui
- Traditional Chinese: 三合會
- Simplified Chinese: 三合会
- Literal meaning: Three Harmonies Society
Transcriptions
Standard Mandarin
- Hanyu Pinyin: Sānhéhuì
- Wade–Giles: San^{1}-ho^{2}-hui^{4}
Yue: Cantonese
- Jyutping: Saam1 Hap6 Wui2
Southern Min
- Hokkien POJ: Saⁿ-ha̍p-hōe

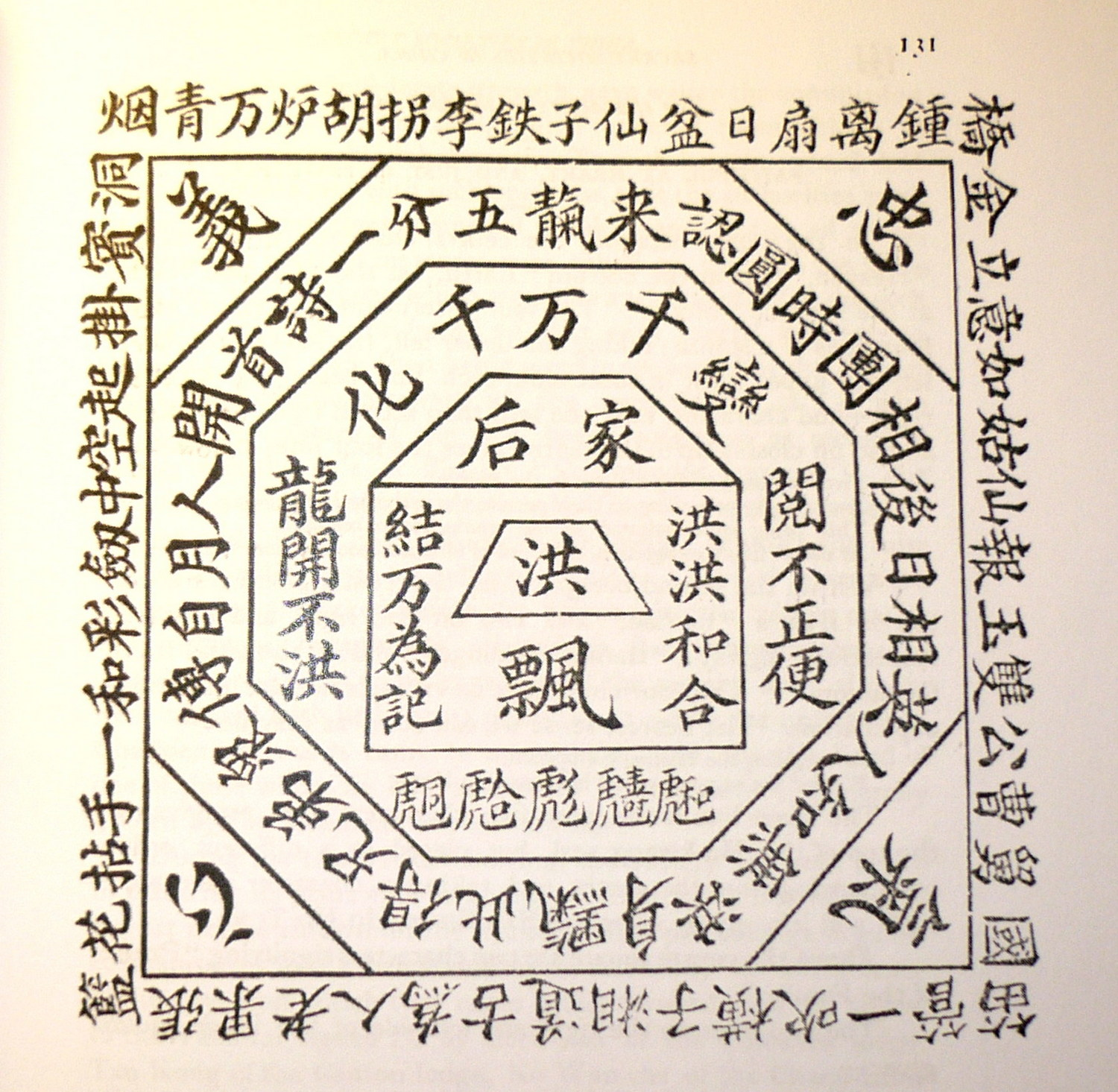
Hongmen seal, 19th century Amoy

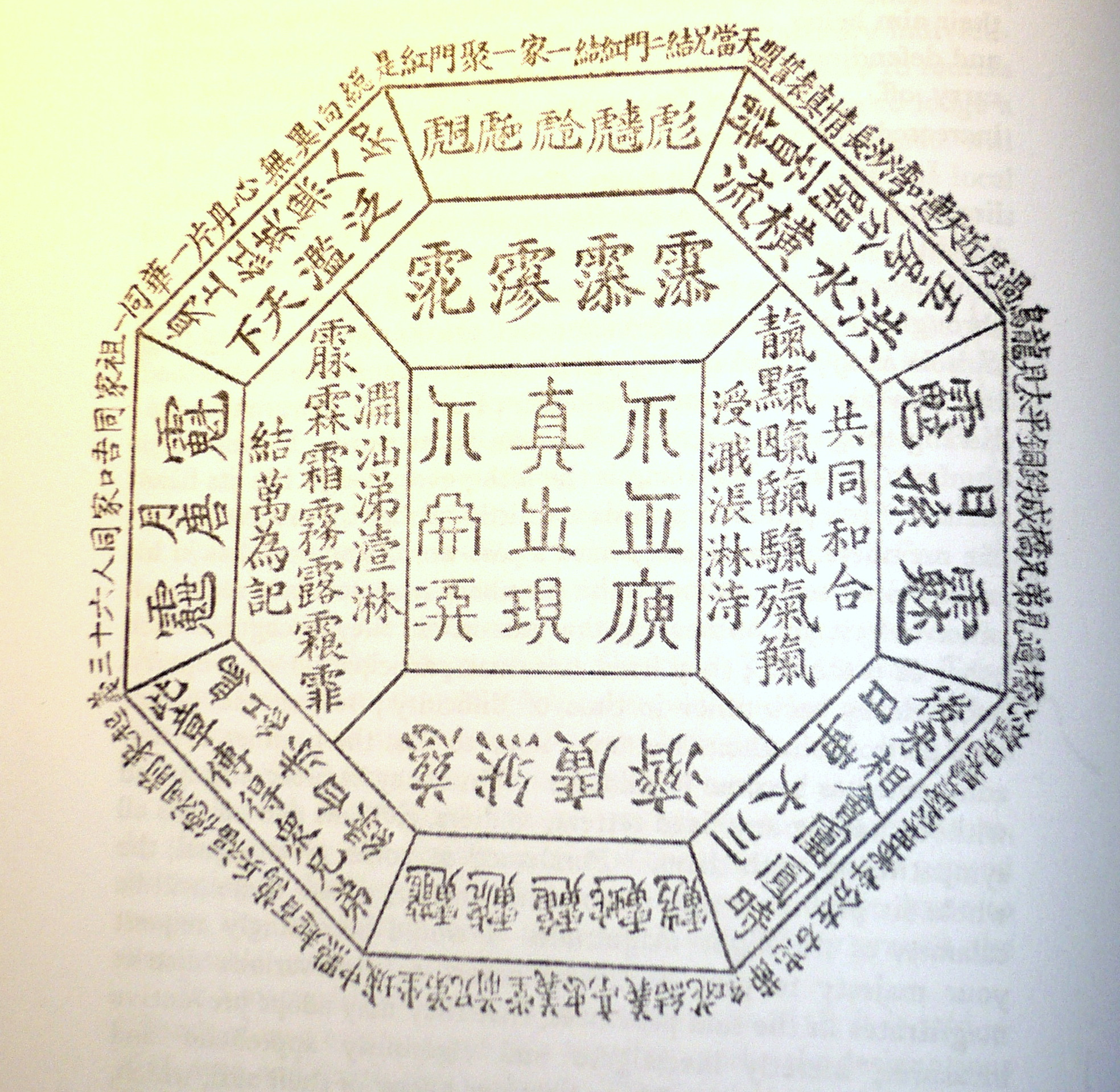
Hongmen seal, 19th century Guangdong

The Hongmen (Vast Family), formerly Tiandihui (Heaven and Earth Society), is a Chinese fraternal organisation and historically a secretive folk religious sect in the vein of the Ming loyalist and anti-Qing White Lotus Society, the Tiandihui's ancestral organisation. As the Tiandihui spread through different Chinese counties and provinces, it branched off into many groups and became known by many names, including the Sanhehui. The Hongmen grouping is today more or less synonymous with the whole Tiandihui concept, although the title "Hongmen" is also claimed by some criminal groups. Its current iteration is purely secular.

During the 19th century, branches of the Hongmen were formed by members of the Chinese diaspora in the United States, Canada and Australia, where they became known as "Chinese Freemasons." Following the collapse of the Qing dynasty in 1911 as a result of the Xinhai Revolution, the Hongmen's central purpose no longer existed, resulted in a divergence among its members, some of whom turned to crime. In modern times, Hongmen associations, particularly in Taiwan, have been associated with united front activities.

== History ==
Republican-era scholars generally thought that the Tiandihui was founded by Ming loyalists in the early Qing dynasty to resist the Manchu invasion of China. In 1964, scholar Cai Shaoqing published the article On the Origins of the Tiandihui (關於天地會的起源問題) based on his research of Qing archives (now known as the First Historical Archives) in Beijing. He concluded that the Tiandihui was founded in 1761 and its roots lay in mutual aid rather than national politics. His interpretation was further developed by his student Qin Baoqi and confirmed by independent research by the Taiwanese scholar Zhuang Jifa.

The founders of the Tiandihui — Ti Xi, Li Amin, Zhu Dingyuan, and Tao Yuan — were all from Zhangpu, Zhangzhou, Fujian, on the border with Guangdong. They left Zhangpu for Sichuan, where they joined a local cult and left disenchanted. Of the four, Ti Xi soon left for Guangdong, where he organised a group of followers in Huizhou. In 1761, he returned to Fujian and organised his followers from both provinces to form the Tiandihui.

A century earlier, the Qing dynasty made membership in such societies illegal, driving them into the arms of the anti-Qing resistance, for whom they now served as an organisational model. The 18th century saw a proliferation of such societies, some of which were devoted to overthrowing the Qing, such as the Tiandihui, which had established itself in the Zhangpu and Pinghe counties of Zhangzhou in 1766. By 1767, Lu Mao had organised within the Tiandihui a campaign of robberies to fund their revolutionary activities.

The Tiandihui began to claim that their society was born of an alliance between Ming dynasty loyalists and five survivors of the destruction of Shaolin Monastery—Cai Dezhong (蔡德忠), Fang Dahong (方大洪), Ma Chaoxing (馬超興), Hu Dedi (胡德帝), and Li Shikai (李式開)—by the Qing forged at the Honghua Ting ("Vast or Red Flower Pavilion"), where they swore to devote themselves to the mission of "Fan Qing Fu Ming" (Chinese: 反淸復明; lit. 'Oppose Qing and restore Ming').

In 1768 anti-Qing Tiandihui rebel Zhao Liangming claimed to be a descendant of the imperial house of the Song dynasty.

The merchant Koh Lay Huan, who had been involved in these subversive activities, had to flee China, arriving in Siam and the Malay States, to eventually settle in Penang as its first Kapitan China before dying in 1826.

During the late 19th century, branches of the Hongmen were formed by Chinese communities overseas, notably the United States, Canada, and Australia, where they are nowadays known as "Chinese Freemasons."

Following the overthrow of the Qing Dynasty of China in 1911, the Hongmen suddenly found themselves without purpose. From then on, the Hongmen diverged into various groups. When some Hongmen groups based within China could no longer rely on donations from sympathetic locals; being unable to resume normal civilian lives after years of hiding, they turned to illegal activities – thus giving birth to the modern Triads.

In modern times, Hongmen associations, particularly in Taiwan, have been associated with united front activities.

== The Hongmen today ==
The Hongmen is believed to consist of about 300,000 members worldwide, members found in mainland China, Taiwan, and Chinese overseas communities. Membership is overwhelmingly ethnically Chinese but there are also Japanese members and a few white American members. The Hongmen are divided into branches, of which there are believed to be approximately 180. The largest of the branches, Wu Sheng Shan, consists of perhaps 180,000 members. Membership is said to be primarily working class, and is also said to include a considerable membership in the armed forces of the Republic of China (Taiwan).

Hongmen members worldwide continue to observe certain common traditions: they all stress their patriotic origin; they all revere Lord Guan, a deified historic Chinese figure who embodies righteousness, patriotism, and loyalty; and they all share certain rituals and traditions such as the concept of brotherhood and a secret handshake.

=== Hong Kong ===
Today, the Hongmen is an illegal society in Hong Kong because of its traditional association with the triads.

=== Taiwan ===
In Taiwan, by contrast, the Hongmen is not only legal, but politically influential; this is not surprising, since Sun Yat-sen, founding father of the Republic of China, was a senior figure within the Hongmen, as was nationalist leader Chiang Kai-shek. Moreover, the Kuomintang, or Chinese Nationalist Party, was formed from the Xingzhonghui and Guangfuhui, groups not unlike the Hongmen.

Because of the Hongmen's revolutionary character and mysterious quality, their future was unclear after the Republic of China central government moved to Taiwan. For a long time, the Republic of China on Taiwan did not openly allow the Hongmen to operate. After martial law ended in 1989, Ge Shan Tang formed and started exchange with the outside world.

Under the influence of Chiang Kai-shek, the Hongmen attempted to remain somewhat secretive, but in recent years the organisation's activities have been more transparent.

The organisation also has numerous business interests, and is reportedly trying to open a martial arts school in Taiwan.

On 1 January 2004, Nan Hua Shan Tang was registered with Taiwan's Ministry of the Interior.

=== Mainland China ===
In mainland China, the Hongmen is known as the Zhi Gong Party (Chinese: 致公党), a political party that participates in the Chinese People's Political Consultative Conference. Jiang Zuojun, chairman of the Zhi Gong Party, is currently the only non-Communist Party minister in the Chinese government.

=== Canada ===
The Canadian branch was established in 1863 in Barkerville, British Columbia. In 1971, Chinese Freemasons National Headquarters of Canada (加拿大洪門民治黨) was incorporated under the Canadian Corporations Act on 31 May 1971, and registered on 22 July 1971. The Barkerville headquarters were donated to the Government of British Columbia.

=== Other ===
The Hongmen continues to exist within numerous overseas Chinese communities, albeit with rapidly aging memberships. Its main purposes today are to act as fraternities among overseas Chinese and to participate in charitable activities. On 28 July 1992, the Hongmen held the 3rd Worldwide Hongmen Conference in the United States. Over 100 worldwide representatives attended for two days of discussion and adopted organisational rules and proclaimed the founding of a worldwide Hongmen association. First session President Li Zhipeng announced the construction of the Hongmen headquarters in Honolulu.

== Biographies ==
- A biography based on the Canadian Chinese Freemasons documents titled 'History of Hongmen and Chinese Freemasons in Canada' (洪門及加拿大洪門史論) was written by Dr. David Chuenyan Lai of University of Victoria.

== See also ==
- 14K Triad
- Bamboo Union
- China Zhi Gong Party
- Da Cheng Rebellion
- Five Elders
- Ghee Hin Kongsi
- Green Gang
- Hai San
- Lin Shuangwen rebellion
- Ngee Heng Kongsi of Johor
- Secret society
- Tong (organization)
- Tongmenghui
- Xiantiandao

== Sources ==
- Murray, Dian H.; Qin, Baoqi (1994). The Origins of the Tiandihui: The Chinese Triads in Legend and History. Stanford University Press. ISBN 978-0-8047-6610-4.
- Ownby, David; Heidhues, Mary (1993). "Secret Societies" Reconsidered: Perspectives on the Social History of Modern South China and Southeast Asia. M.E. Sharpe. ISBN 978-0-7656-4116-8.
- Ownby, David (1995). "The Heaven and Earth Society as Popular Religion". The Journal of Asian Studies. 54 (4): 1023–1046. doi:10.2307/2059958. JSTOR 2059958. S2CID 162946271.
