= Urban area =

Human settlement with high population density and infrastructure of built environment

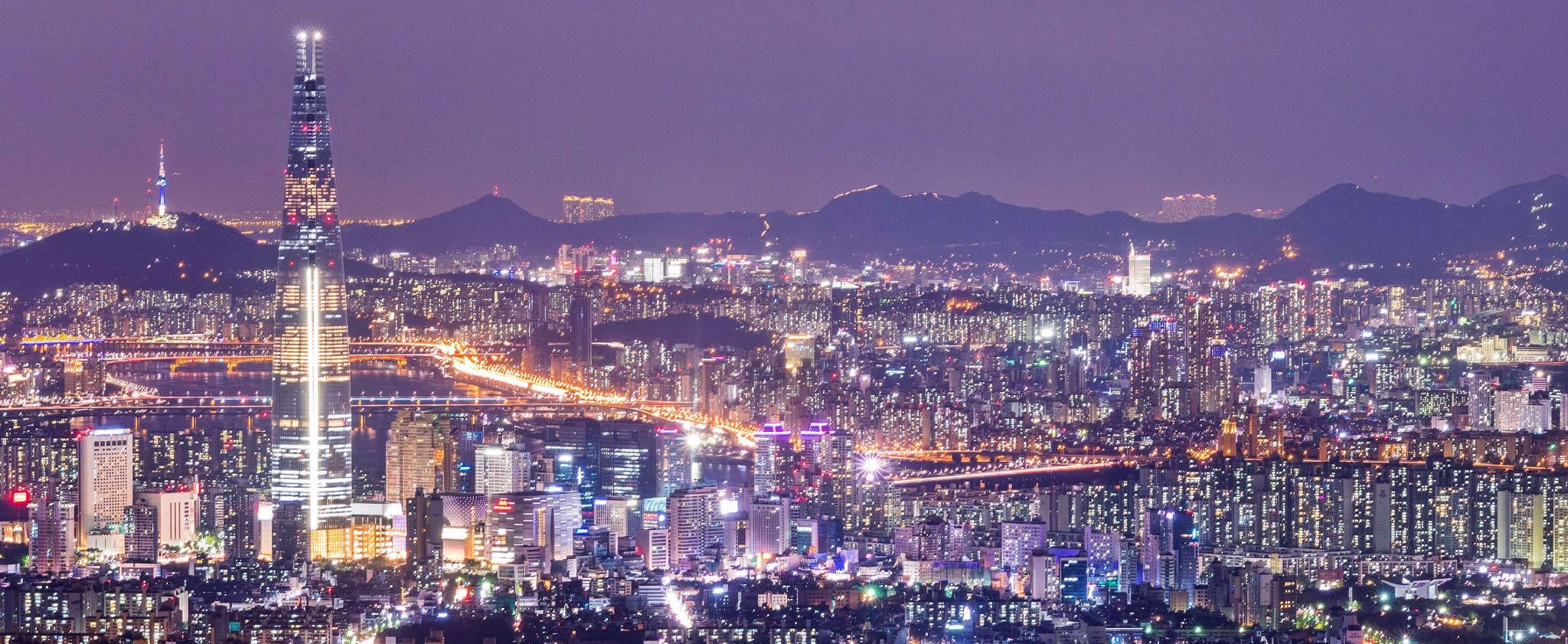
Skyline of Seoul at night

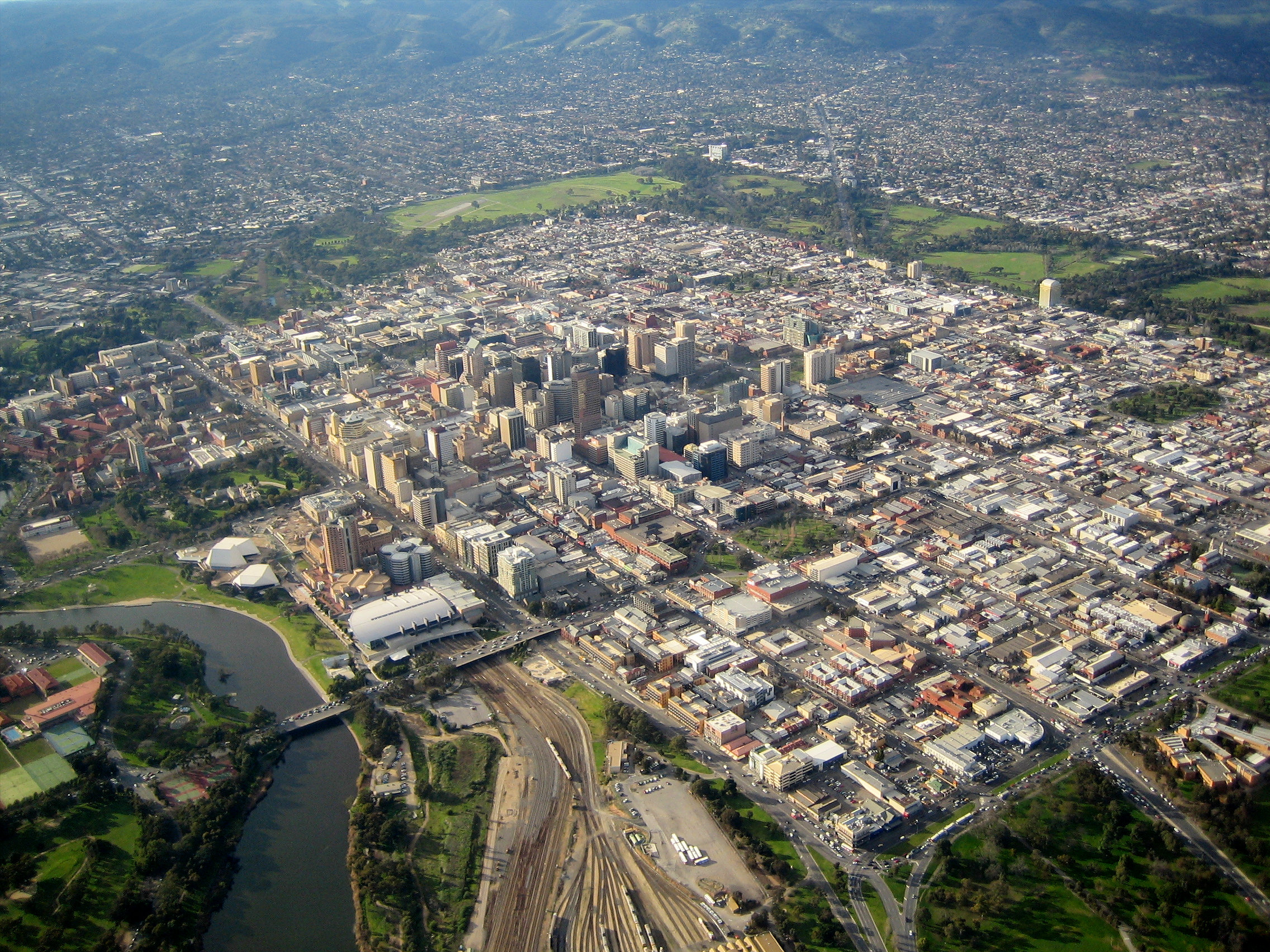
Aerial view of Greater Adelaide, the parklands serve as a barrier between the inner CBD and encompassing urban area

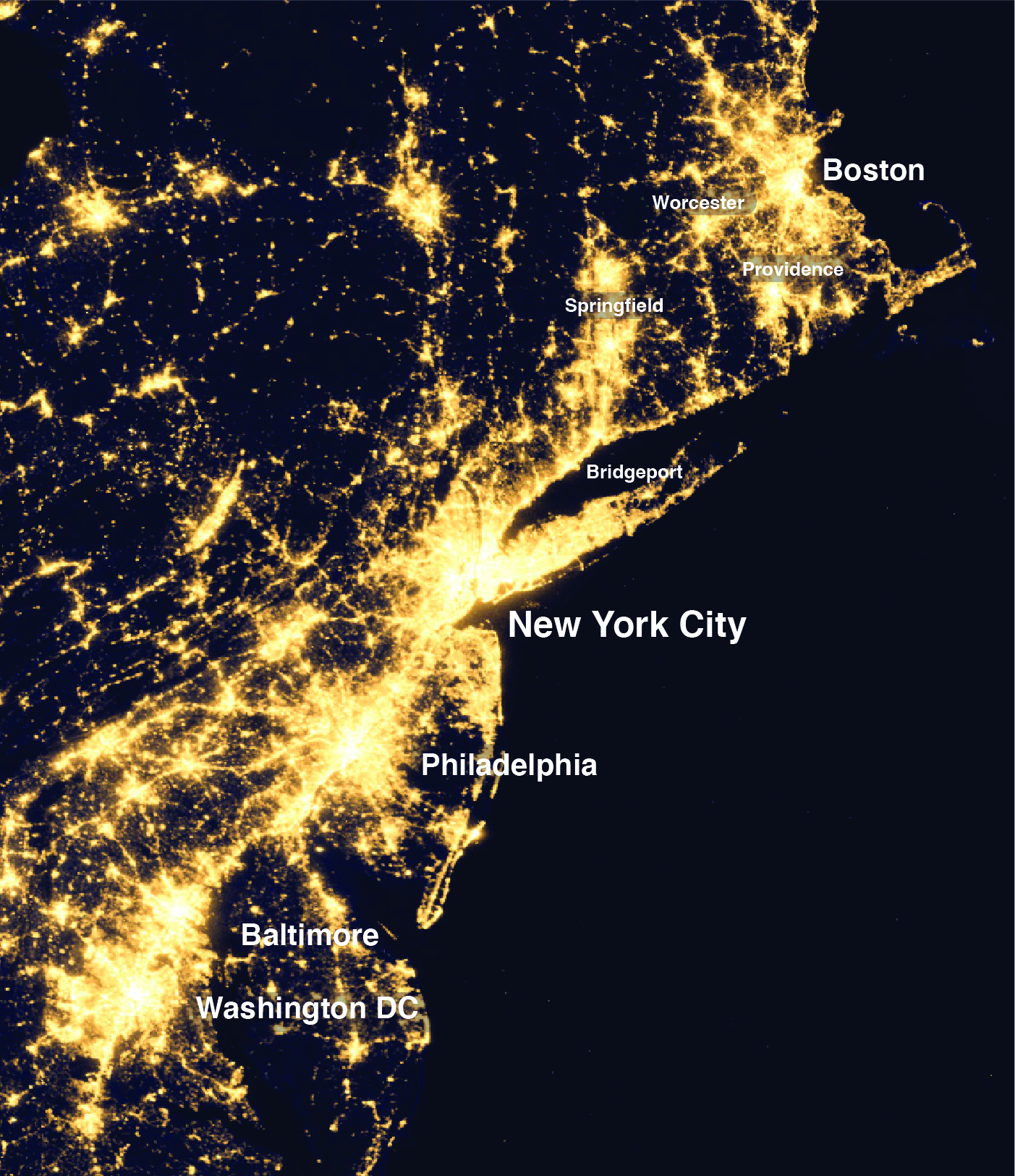
A satellite view of the U.S. Northeast megalopolis at night, the world's most economically productive megalopolis with over 50 million residents, centered on New York City

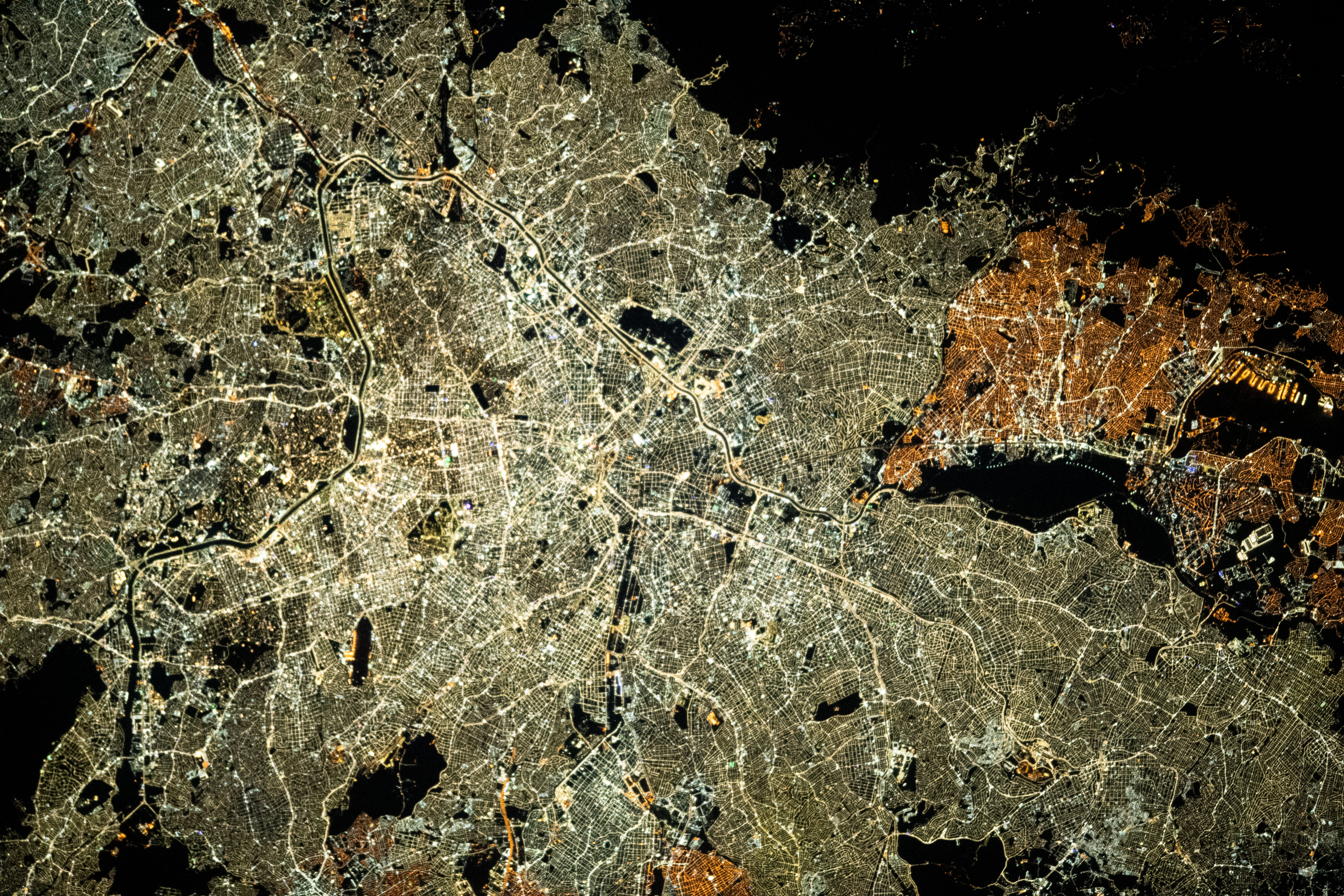
Greater São Paulo at night, as seen from the International Space Station

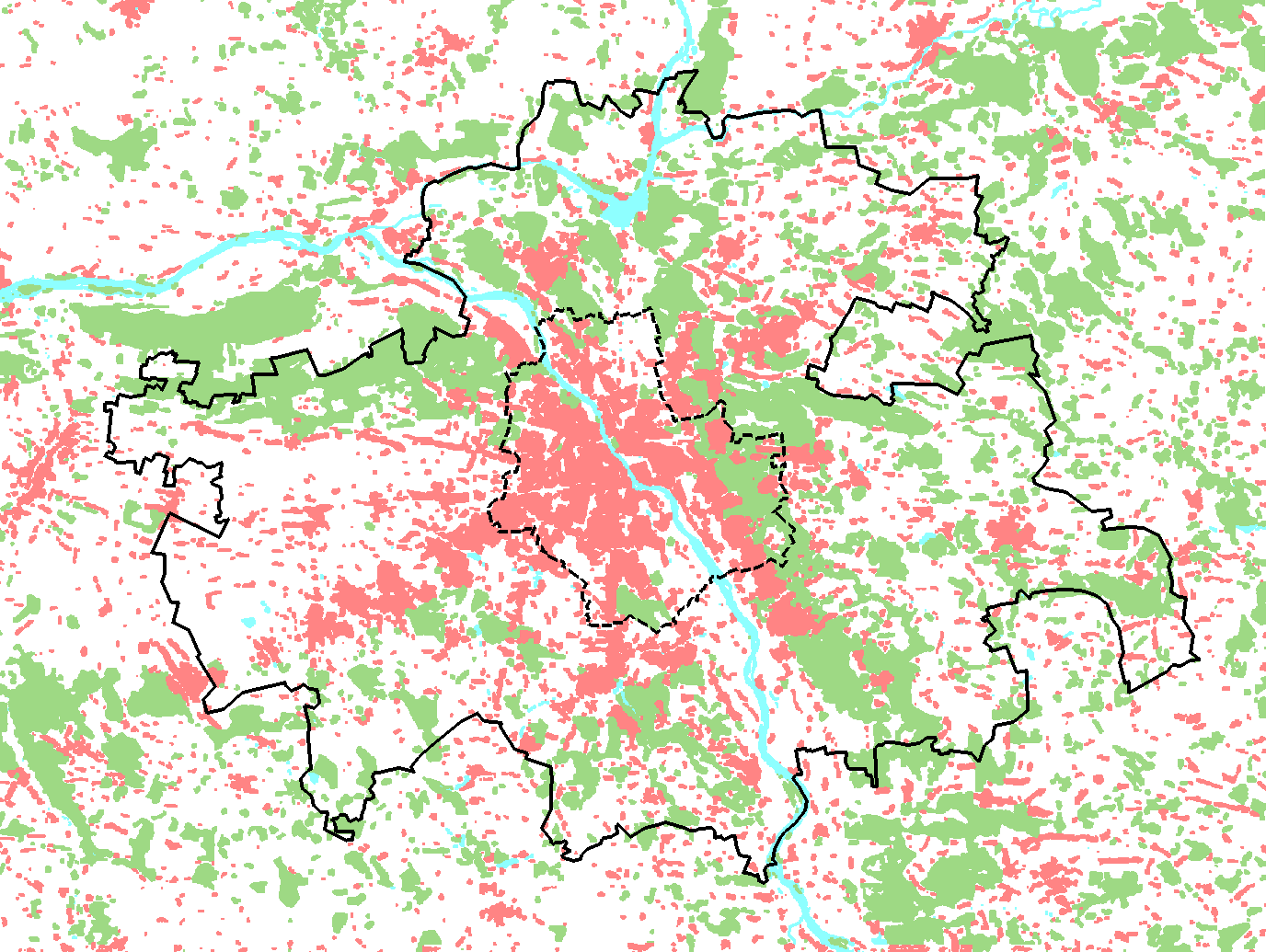
Warsaw metropolitan area

An urban area, also known as a built-up area or urban agglomeration, is a human settlement with a high population density and an infrastructure of built environment. Urban areas originate through urbanization, and researchers categorize them as cities, towns, conurbations or suburbs. In urbanism, the term "urban area" contrasts to rural areas such as villages and hamlets. In urban sociology or urban anthropology, it often contrasts with natural environment.

The development of earlier predecessors of modern urban areas during the urban revolution of the 4th millennium BC led to the formation of human civilization and ultimately to modern urban planning, which along with other human activities such as exploitation of natural resources has led to a human impact on the environment.

== Recent historical growth ==
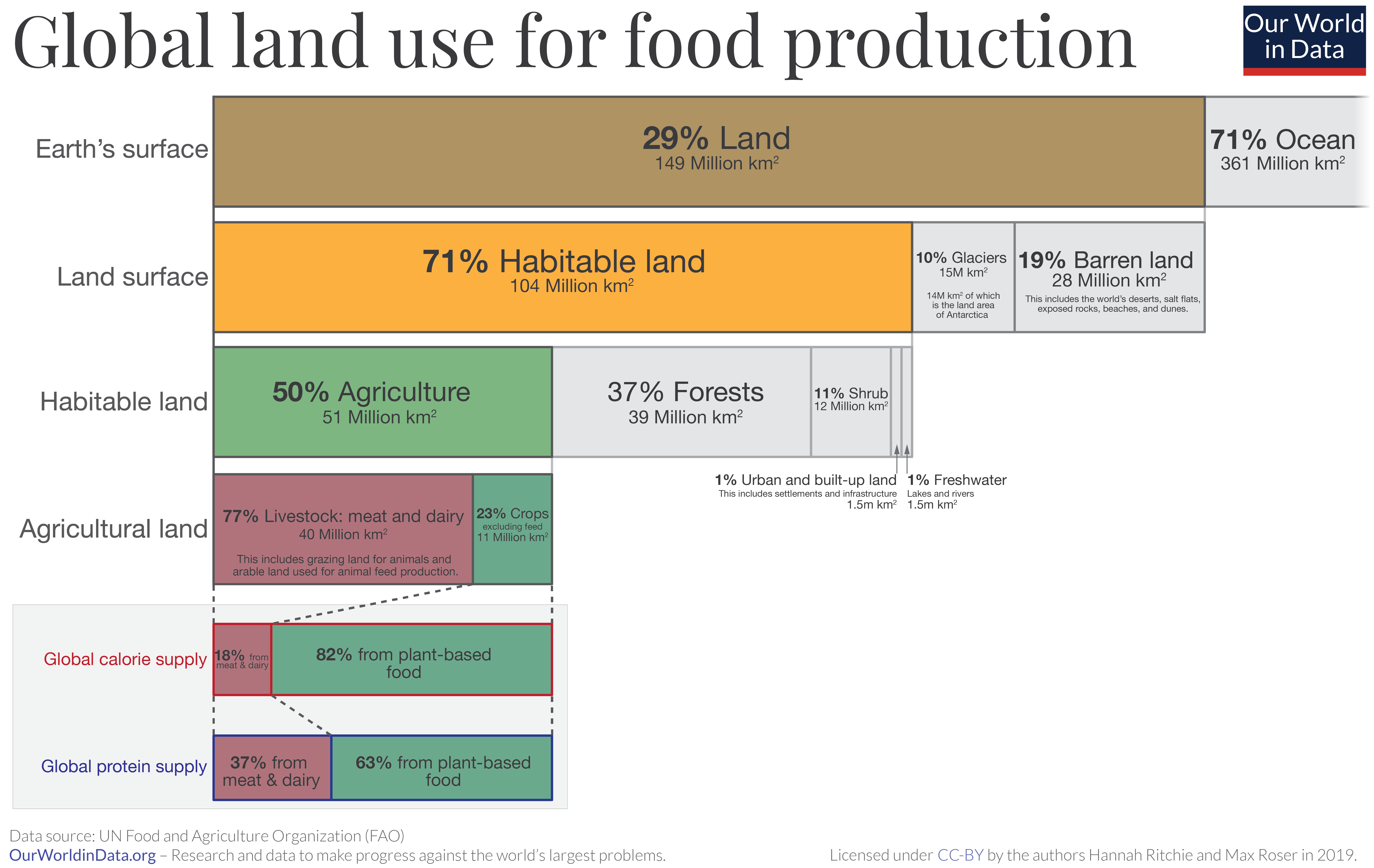
Earth's land use in 2019, built-up area being estimated as 1.5 million square kilometers

In 1950, 764 million people (or about 30 percent of the world's 2.5 billion people) lived in urban areas. In 2009, the number of people living in urban areas (3.42 billion) surpassed the number living in rural areas (3.41 billion), and since then the world has become more urban than rural. By 2014, it was 3.9 billion (or about 53 percent of the world's 7.3 billion people) that lived in urban areas. The change was driven by a combination of increased total population and increased percent of population living in urban areas. This was the first time that the majority of the world's population lived in a city. By that time a high estimate calculated up to 3.5 million square kilometers of land was urban, estimates ranging from 1% of global land area.

In 2014 there were 7.3 billion people living on the planet, of which the global urban population comprised 3.9 billion. The Population Division of the United Nations Department of Economic and Social Affairs at that time predicted the urban population would occupy 68% of the world population by 2050, with 90% of that growth coming from Africa and Asia.

Globally, urban areas more than doubled in size between 1992 to 2015, growing from 33 million hectares (Mha) to 71 Mha in 2015. This expansion consumed 24 Mha of some of the most fertile croplands, 3.3 Mha of forestlands and 4.6 Mha of shrubland.

== Urbanization ==
Urban land area

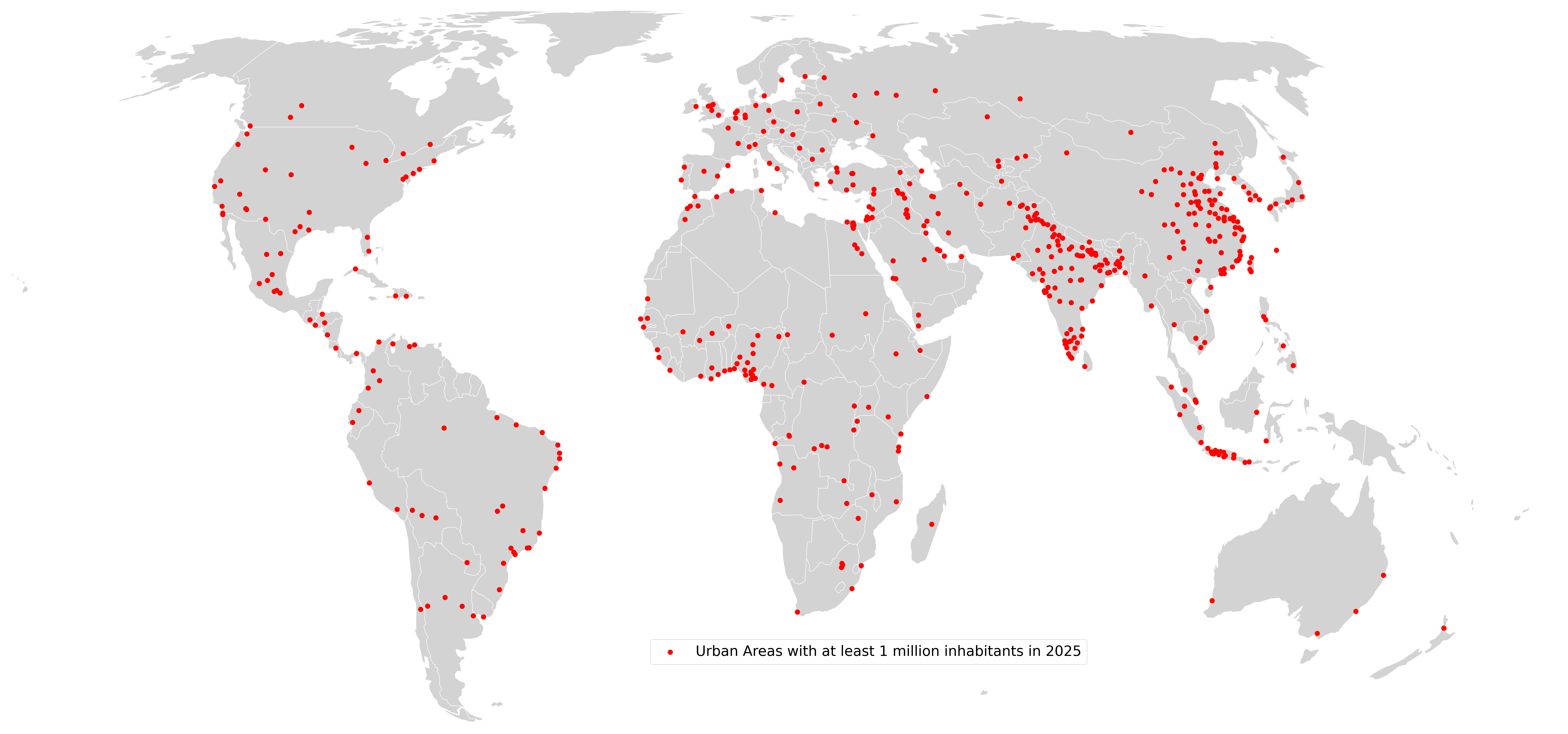
Urban areas with at least one million inhabitants in 2025

Urban areas are created and further developed by the process of urbanization. They are measured for various purposes, including analyzing population density and urban sprawl. Urban areas are generally found in the United States, Canada, Brazil, Mexico, Argentina, Chile, Japan, Australia, and many other countries where the urbanization rate is high.

Unlike an urban area, a metropolitan area includes not only the urban area, but also intervening rural land and satellite cities that are socio-economically connected to the urban area. The urban area serves as the core of a metropolitan area, typically by employment ties through commuting, with the urban area being the primary labor market.

The concept of an "urban area" as used in economic statistics should not be confused with the concept of the "urban area" used in road safety statistics. This term was first created by geographer Brian Manning. The latter concept is also known as "built-up area in road safety". According to the definition by the Office for National Statistics, "Built-up areas are defined as land which is 'irreversibly urban in character', meaning that they are characteristic of a town or city. They include areas of built-up land with a minimum of 20 hectares (200,000 m^{2}; 49 acres). Any areas [separated by] less than 200 metres [of non-urban space] are linked to become a single built-up area.

Argentina and Japan are countries where the urbanization rate is over 100% while Australia, Brazil, Canada, Chile, Mexico, and the United States are countries where the urbanization rate is between 80% and 90%, although within the U.S. state of New Jersey, the urbanization rate is 100%.

== Largest urban areas ==
There are two measures of the degree of urbanization of a population. The first, urban population, describes the percentage of the total population living in urban areas, as defined by the country. The second measure, rate of urbanization, describes the projected average rate of change of the size of the urban population over the given period of time. According to Urbanization by sovereign state article, the world as a whole is 56.2% urbanized, with roughly one-quarter of the countries reported as greater than 80% urbanized. Data is taken from the U.S. Central Intelligence Agency World Factbook estimates from 2020.

According to Demographia, these are the urban areas in the world with a population exceeding 5,000,000 (as of 2025):

	Urban Area	Country/ Region	Population
1	Guangzhou-Shenzhen	China	69,562,000
2	Shanghai-Changzhou	China	45,115,000
3	Tokyo-Yokohama	Japan	37,325,000
4	Jakarta	Indonesia	36,877,000
5	Delhi	India	33,224,000
6	Mumbai	India	26,237,000
7	Manila	Philippines	25,521,000
8	Dhaka	Bangladesh	25,305,000
9	Seoul-Incheon	South Korea	23,825,000
10	Mexico City	Mexico	23,146,802
11	Cairo	Egypt	22,684,000
12	Beijing	China	22,363,000
13	São Paulo	Brazil	21,747,000
14	Karachi	Pakistan	21,258,000
15	Kolkata	India	20,327,000
16	Bangkok	Thailand	20,284,000
17	New York	United States	19,426,449
18	Moscow	Russia	19,100,000
19	Bangalore	India	16,216,000
20	Ho Chi Minh City	Vietnam	16,024,000
21	Buenos Aires	Argentina	15,933,000
22	Lagos	Nigeria	15,283,000
23	Johannesburg-Pretoria	South Africa	15,026,000
24	Osaka-Kobe-Kyoto	Japan	14,998,000
25	Istanbul	Turkey	14,749,000
26	Lahore	Pakistan	14,256,000
27	Tehran	Iran	14,137,000
28	Kinshasa	Democratic Republic of the Congo	13,060,000
29	Rio de Janeiro	Brazil	12,546,000
30	Hangzhou-Shaoxing	China	12,422,000
31	Los Angeles	United States	12,237,376
32	Shantou-Jieyang	China	12,187,000
33	Tianjin	China	12,095,000
34	Chennai	India	11,950,000
35	Luanda	Angola	11,892,000
36	Chongqing	China	11,524,000
37	London	United Kingdom	11,360,000
38	Paris	France	11,282,000
39	Lima	Peru	10,914,000
40	Bogota	Colombia	10,734,000
41	Hyderabad	India	10,101,000
42	Wuhan	China	10,041,000
43	Kuala Lumpur	Malaysia	9,899,000
44	Taipei	Taiwan	9,866,000
45	Nagoya	Japan	9,617,000
46	Nanjing	China	8,929,000
47	Dar es Salaam	Tanzania	8,877,000
48	Chicago	United States	8,790,000
49	Riyadh	Saudi Arabia	8,589,000
50	Xi'an	China	8,313,000
51	Chengdu	China	8,040,000
52	Ahmedabad	India	7,961,000
53	Addis Ababa	Ethiopia	7,922,000
54	Shenyang-Fushun	China	7,768,000
55	Onitsha	Nigeria	7,756,000
56	Khartoum	Sudan	7,677,000
57	Washington-Baltimore	United States	7,636,000
58	Bandung	Indonesia	7,490,000
59	Boston-Providence	United States	7,375,000
60	Nairobi	Kenya	7,264,000
61	Santiago	Chile	7,192,000
62	Baghdad	Iraq	7,160,000
63	Hong Kong	Hong Kong	7,117,000
64	Dallas-Fort Worth	United States	6,980,000
65	Madrid	Spain	6,966,000
66	Pune	India	6,944,000
67	Essen-Düsseldorf	Germany	6,874,000
68	Zhengzhou	China	6,860,000
69	Surabaya	Indonesia	6,820,000
69	Yangon	Myanmar	6,820,000
71	Houston	United States	6,804,000
72	Amman	Jordan	6,694,000
73	Quanzhou	China	6,487,000
74	Abidjan	Ivory Coast	6,461,000
75	Toronto	Canada	6,400,000
76	San Francisco	United States	6,376,000
77	Accra	Ghana	5,785,000
78	Surat	India	6,601,000
79	Xiamen-Zhangzhou	China	6,237,000
80	Miami	United States	6,129,000
81	Singapore	Singapore	6,056,000
82	Kabul	Afghanistan	6,009,000
83	Alexandria	Egypt	5,916,000
84	Hefei	China	5,875,000
85	St. Petersburg	Russia	5,869,000
86	Qingdao	China	5,806,000
87	Hanoi	Vietnam	5,700,000
88	Philadelphia	United States	5,697,000
89	Faisalabad	Pakistan	5,650,000
90	Ankara	Turkey	5,638,000
91	Milan	Italy	5,631,000
92	Atlanta	United States	5,495,000
93	Barcelona	Spain	5,489,000
94	Jiddah	Saudi Arabia	5,482,000
95	Taiyuan	China	5,371,000
96	Belo Horizonte	Brazil	5,368,000
97	Mashhad	Iran	5,321,000
98	Rawalpindi-Islamabad	Pakistan	5,203,000
99	Kumasi	Ghana	5,192,000
100	Melbourne	Australia	5,185,000
101	Dubai	United Arab Emirates	5,097,000
102	Yaounde	Cameroon	5,095,000
103	Kampala	Uganda	5,074,000
104	Sydney	Australia	5,037,000

== Definitions ==
Presently, urban data are based on arbitrary definitions that vary from country to country and from year or census to the next, making them difficult to compare.

The UN publishes data on cities, urban areas and rural areas, but relies almost entirely on national definitions of these areas. The UN principles and recommendations state that due to different characteristics of urban and rural areas across the globe, a global definition is not possible.

—

European countries define urbanized areas on the basis of urban-type land use, not allowing any gaps of typically more than 200 metres (220 yd), and use satellite imagery instead of census blocks to determine the boundaries of the urban area. In less-developed countries, in addition to land use and density requirements, a requirement that a large majority of the population, typically 75%, is not engaged in agriculture and/or fishing is sometimes used.

== By region ==
=== Africa ===
==== South Africa ====
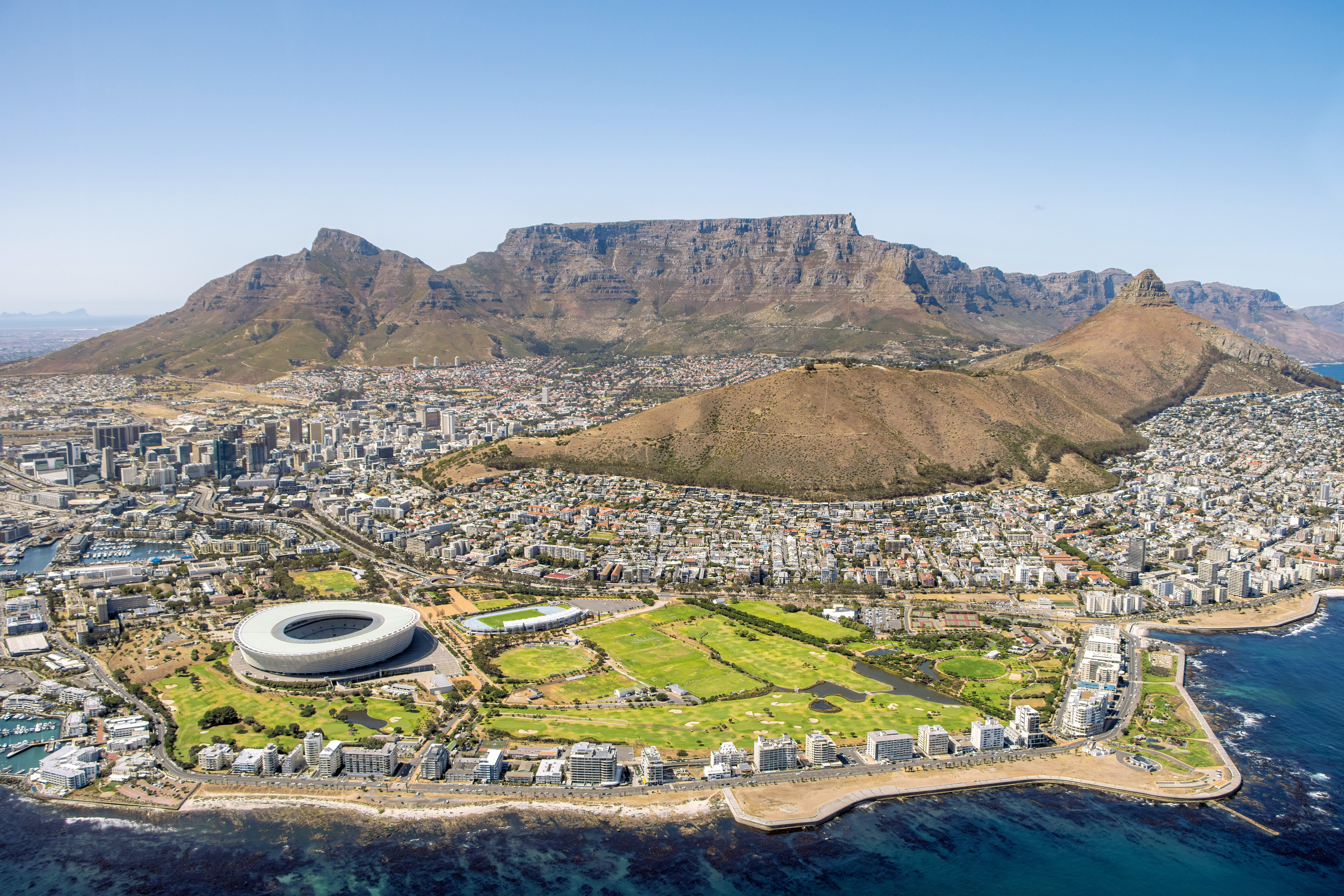
Cape Town, South Africa's second-largest metro by population

South Africa has eight metro areas. Metropolitan municipalities (Category A municipalities), as defined in SA, are the most developed areas of the country, and execute all the functions of local government for a city or conurbation. They are created by provincial governments. As per the country's 2022 census data, South Africa has five metros (major urban areas) with a population of over four million residents, with the other three having a population of around one million. The country's three branches of government are split over different cities. Cape Town is the legislative capital, Pretoria the administrative capital, and Bloemfontein the judicial capital. The table below shows all South African metro areas, ranked by population size.

Name	Province	Seat of government	Population (2022)	Area (km^{2})	Pop. density (per km^{2})
City of Johannesburg Metropolitan Municipality	Gauteng	Johannesburg	4,803,262	1,645	2,924
City of Cape Town Metropolitan Municipality	Western Cape	Cape Town	4,772,864	2,446	1,956
eThekwini Metropolitan Municipality	KwaZulu-Natal	Durban	4,239,901	2,556	1,659
City of Ekurhuleni Metropolitan Municipality	Gauteng	Germiston	4,066,691	1,975	2,058
City of Tshwane Metropolitan Municipality	Gauteng	Pretoria	4,040,315	6,298	642
Nelson Mandela Bay Metropolitan Municipality	Eastern Cape	Gqeberha	1,190,496	1,957	608
Buffalo City Metropolitan Municipality	Eastern Cape	East London	975,255	2,750	354
Mangaung Metropolitan Municipality	Free State	Bloemfontein	811,431	9,886	82

=== Asia ===
==== East Asia ====
===== China =====
Since 2000, China's cities have expanded at an average rate of 10% annually. It is estimated that China's urban population will increase by 292 million people by 2050, when its cities will house a combined population of over one billion. The country's urbanization rate increased from 17.4% to 46.6% between 1978 and 2009. Between 150 and 200 million migrant workers work part-time in the major cities, returning home to the countryside periodically with their earnings.

China has more cities with one million or more long-term residents than any other country, including the three global cities of Beijing, Hong Kong, and Shanghai; by 2025, the country will be home to 221 cities with over a million inhabitants. The figures in the table below are from the 2008 census, and are only estimates of the urban populations within administrative city limits; a different ranking exists when considering the total municipal populations (which includes suburban and rural populations). The large "floating populations" of migrant workers make conducting censuses in urban areas difficult; the figures below include only long-term residents.

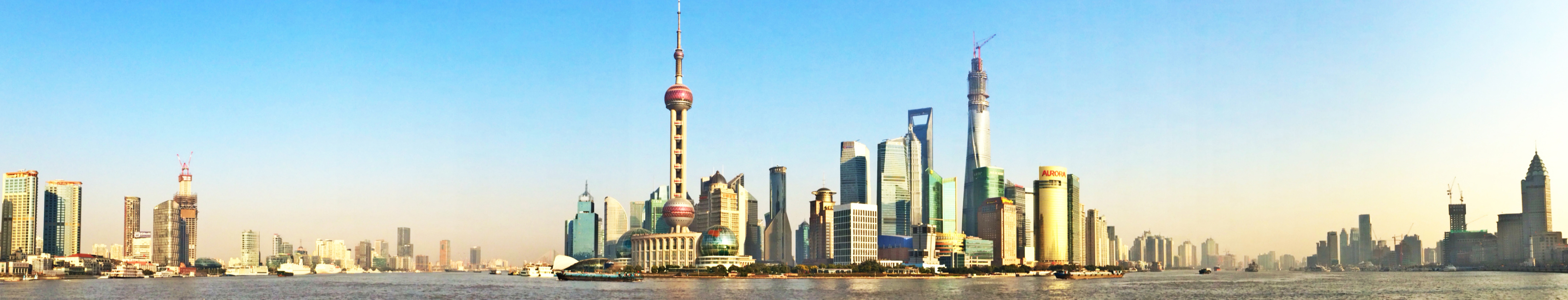
Panoramic view of Pudong's skyline from the Bund in Shanghai

Largest cities or municipalities in China China Urban Construction Statistical Yearbook 2020 Urban population and urban temporary population (Note: Population of Hong Kong as of 2018 estimate) (Note: The data for Chongqing refers to its "Metropolitan Developed Economic Area", excluding outlying counties of the larger municipality.)
Rank	Name	Province	Pop.	Rank	Name	Province	Pop.
1	Shanghai	SH	24,281,400	11	Hong Kong	HK	7,448,900
2	Beijing	BJ	19,164,000	12	Zhengzhou	HA	7,179,400
3	Guangzhou	GD	13,858,700	13	Nanjing	JS	6,823,500
4	Shenzhen	GD	13,438,800	14	Xi'an	SN	6,642,100
5	Tianjin	TJ	11,744,400	15	Jinan	SD	6,409,600
6	Chongqing	CQ	11,488,000	16	Shenyang	LN	5,900,000
7	Dongguan	GD	9,752,500	17	Qingdao	SD	5,501,400
8	Chengdu	SC	8,875,600	18	Harbin	HL	5,054,500
9	Wuhan	HB	8,652,900	19	Hefei	AH	4,750,100
10	Hangzhou	ZJ	8,109,000	20	Changchun	JL	4,730,900

===== Japan =====
In Japan, urbanized areas are defined as contiguous areas of densely inhabited districts (DIDs) using census enumeration districts as units with a density requirement of 4,000 inhabitants per square kilometre (10,000/sq mi).

===== South Korea =====
Seoul is the largest urban area in South Korea.

===== Taiwan =====
Greater Taipei is the largest urban area in Taiwan.

==== South Asia ====
===== Bangladesh =====
In Bangladesh, there are total 532 urban areas, which are divided into three categories. Those are City Corporation, Municipal Corporation (Pourasova) and Upazila town. Among those urban areas, Dhaka is the largest city by population and area, with a population of 19.10 million. In Bangladesh, there are total 11 City Corporations and 329 Municipal Corporations and 203 Small towns, which serves as the center for Upazilas. According to 2011 population census, Bangladesh has an urban population of 28%, with a growth rate of 2.8%. At this growth rate, it is estimated that the urban population of Bangladesh will reach 79 million or 42% of total population by 2035.

===== India =====
For the Census of India 2011, the definition of urban area is a place having a minimum population of 5,000 of density 400 persons per square kilometre (1,000/sq mi) or higher, and 75% plus of the male working population employed in non-agricultural activities. Places administered by a municipal corporation, cantonment board or notified town area committee are automatically considered urban areas.

The Census of India 2011 also defined the term "urban agglomeration" as an integrated urban area consisting of a core town together with its "outgrowths" (contiguous suburbs).

Largest urban agglomerations in India by population (2011 census)
Rank	City name	State/territory	Population	Rank	City name	State/territory	Population
1	Mumbai	Maharashtra	18,394,912	28	Ludhiana	Punjab	1,618,879
2	Delhi	Delhi	16,349,831	29	Nashik	Maharashtra	1,562,769
3	Kolkata	West Bengal	14,112,536	30	Vijayawada	Andhra Pradesh	1,491,202
4	Chennai	Tamil Nadu	8,696,010	31	Madurai	Tamil Nadu	1,465,625
5	Bengaluru	Karnataka	8,520,435	32	Varanasi	Uttar Pradesh	1,435,113
6	Hyderabad	Telangana	7,749,334	33	Meerut	Uttar Pradesh	1,424,908
7	Ahmedabad	Gujarat	6,361,084	34	Faridabad	Haryana	1,414,050
8	Pune	Maharashtra	5,057,709	35	Rajkot	Gujarat	1,390,933
9	Surat	Gujarat	4,591,246	36	Jamshedpur	Jharkhand	1,339,438
10	Jaipur	Rajasthan	3,073,350	37	Srinagar	Jammu and Kashmir	1,273,312
11	Kanpur	Uttar Pradesh	2,920,496	38	Jabalpur	Madhya Pradesh	1,268,848
12	Lucknow	Uttar Pradesh	2,902,920	39	Asansol	West Bengal	1,243,414
13	Nagpur	Maharashtra	2,497,870	40	Vasai-Virar	Maharashtra	1,222,390
14	Ghaziabad	Uttar Pradesh	2,375,820	41	Prayagraj	Uttar Pradesh	1,216,719
15	Indore	Madhya Pradesh	2,170,295	42	Dhanbad	Jharkhand	1,196,214
16	Coimbatore	Tamil Nadu	2,151,466	43	Aurangabad	Maharashtra	1,193,167
17	Kochi	Kerala	2,119,724	44	Amritsar	Punjab	1,183,705
18	Patna	Bihar	2,049,156	45	Jodhpur	Rajasthan	1,138,300
19	Kozhikode	Kerala	2,030,519	46	Ranchi	Jharkhand	1,126,741
20	Bhopal	Madhya Pradesh	1,886,100	47	Raipur	Chhattisgarh	1,123,558
21	Thrissur	Kerala	1,861,269	48	Kollam	Kerala	1,110,668
22	Vadodara	Gujarat	1,822,221	49	Gwalior	Madhya Pradesh	1,102,884
23	Agra	Uttar Pradesh	1,760,285	50	Bhilai	Chhattisgarh	1,064,222
24	Visakhapatnam	Andhra Pradesh	1,730,320	51	Chandigarh	Chandigarh	1,026,459
25	Malappuram	Kerala	1,699,060	52	Tiruchirappalli	Tamil Nadu	1,022,518
26	Thiruvananthapuram	Kerala	1,687,406	53	Kota	Rajasthan	1,001,694
27	Kannur	Kerala	1,642,892	54	Mysore	Karnataka	990,900

===== Pakistan =====
In Pakistan, an area is a major city and municipality if it has more than 100,000 inhabitants according to census results. Cities include adjacent cantonments.

Urbanisation in Pakistan has increased since the time of independence and has several different causes. The majority of southern Pakistan's population lives along the Indus River. Karachi is its most populous city. In the northern half of the country, most of the population lives in an arc formed by the cities of Lahore, Faisalabad, Rawalpindi, Islamabad, Gujranwala, Sialkot, Gujrat, Jhelum, Sargodha, Sheikhupura, Nowshera, Mardan and Peshawar. During 1990–2008, city dwellers made up 36% of Pakistan's population, making it the most urbanised nation in South Asia. Furthermore, 50% of Pakistanis live in towns of 5,000 people or more. Karachi is the most populated city in Pakistan closely followed by Lahore according to the 2017 Census.

==== Southeast Asia ====
===== Philippines =====
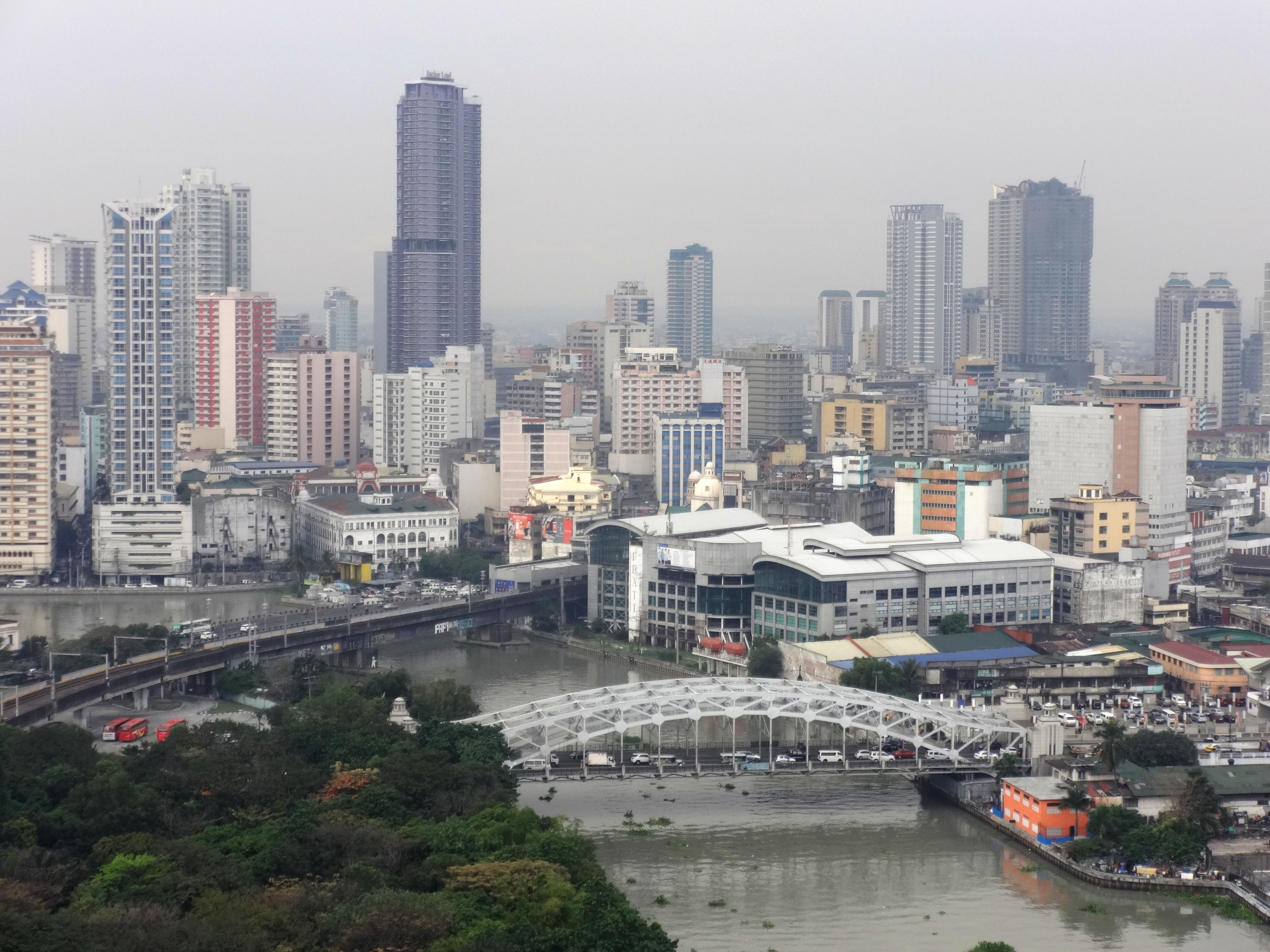
A view of downtown Manila.

In 2020, 54 percent of the Philippine population lived in urban areas. With an estimated population of 16.3 million, Metro Manila is the most populous metropolitan area in the Philippines and the 11th in the world. However, the greater urban area is the 5th largest in the world with a population of 20,654,307 people (2010 estimate).

===== Singapore =====
As an island city-state, about 5.6 million people live and work within 700 square kilometres (270 sq mi). With 64 islands and islets, Singapore Island makes up the largest urban area in the country. According to the United Nations Economic and Social Commission for Asia and the Pacific, the country has the highest urbanised population in Southeast Asia, with 100 percent of its population living in an urban area. The Urban Redevelopment Authority (URA) is responsible for the urban land-use planning, which designates land use and urban density of the country. The country is divided into 5 regions for planning purposes by the URA, even though as a city state Singapore is defined as a single continuous urban area. It is further subdivided into 55 urban planning areas, which acts as the boundaries of planned towns within the country.

===== Thailand =====
Bangkok is the largest urban area in Thailand.

===== Vietnam =====
In Vietnam, there are six types of urban areas:

- Special urban area (2 municipalities): Hanoi and Ho Chi Minh City.
- Type I urban area (18 provincial cities and 3 municipalities): Long Xuyên, Pleiku, Mỹ Tho, Thủ Dầu Một, Bắc Ninh, Biên Hòa, Hải Dương, Thanh Hóa, Hạ Long, Việt Trì, Thái Nguyên, Nam Định, Vũng Tàu, Buôn Ma Thuột, Đà Lạt, Quy Nhơn, Nha Trang, Huế, Vinh, Cần Thơ, Đà Nẵng and Hải Phòng.
- Type II urban area (21 provincial cities and 1 district):Châu Đốc, Đồng Hới, Uông Bí, Bắc Giang, Ninh Bình, Bạc Liêu, Bà Rịa, Thái Bình, Rạch Giá, Cà Mau, Phan Rang–Tháp Chàm, Tuy Hòa, Phan Thiết, Vĩnh Yên, Lào Cai and Phú Quốc.
- Type III urban area (31 provincial cities and 12 towns).
- Type IV urban area (35 towns and 35 townships).
- Type V urban area (586 townships and 54 communes).

=== Europe ===
==== Finland ====
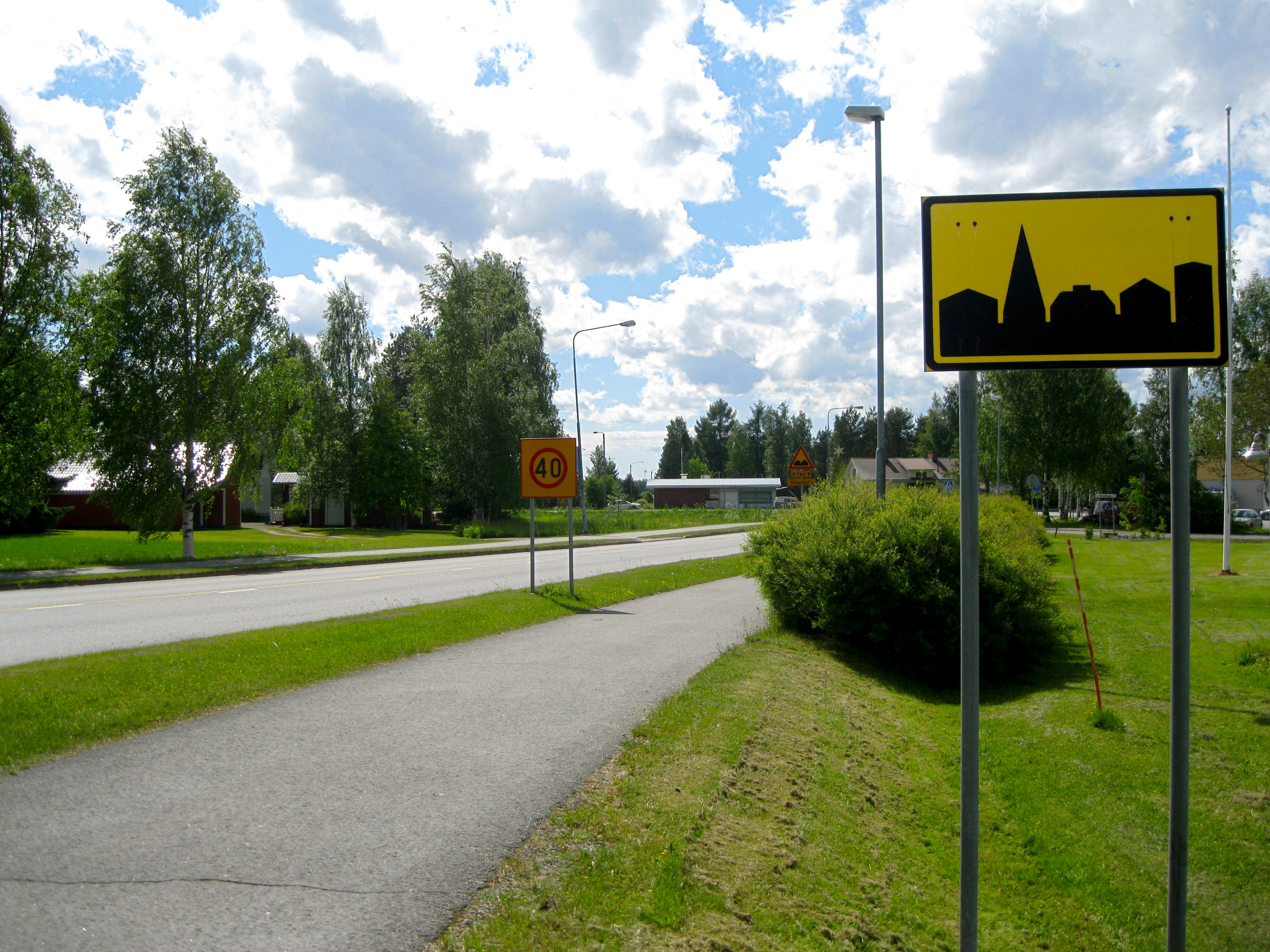
A street sign in Vimpeli indicating the beginning of an urban area in Finland

As in other Nordic countries, an urban area (taajama in Finnish) in Finland must have a building at least every 200 m (660 ft) and at least 200 people. To be considered a town or a city (kaupunki) for statistical purposes, an urban area must have at least 15,000 people. This is not to be confused with the city / town designation used by municipalities.

==== France ====
In France, an urban area (Fr: aire d'attraction d'une ville) is a zone encompassing an area of built-up growth (called an "urban unit" (unité urbaine) – close in definition to the North American urban area) and its commuter belt (couronne). Americans would find the INSEE definition of the urban area to be similar to their metropolitan area.

The largest cities in France, in terms of urban area population (2017), are Paris (12,628,266), Lyon (2,323,221), Marseille (1,760,653), Toulouse (1,360,829), Bordeaux (1,247,977), Lille (1,191,117), Nice (1,006,201), Nantes (972,828), Strasbourg (790,087) and Rennes (733,320).

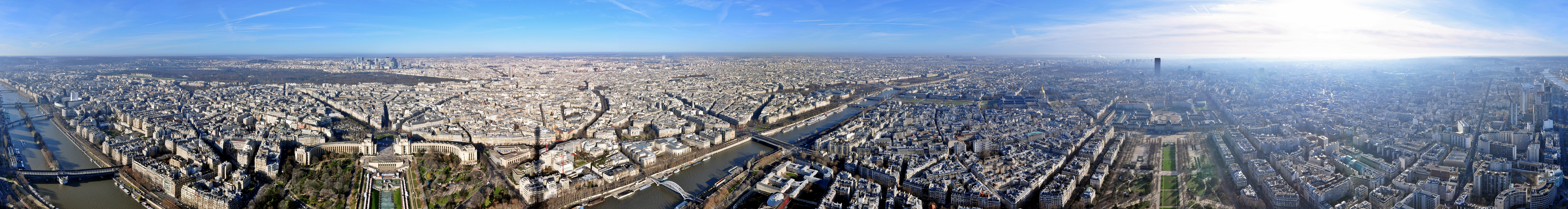
Panorama of Paris as seen from the Eiffel Tower as full 360-degree view (river flowing from north-east to south-west, right to left

==== Germany ====
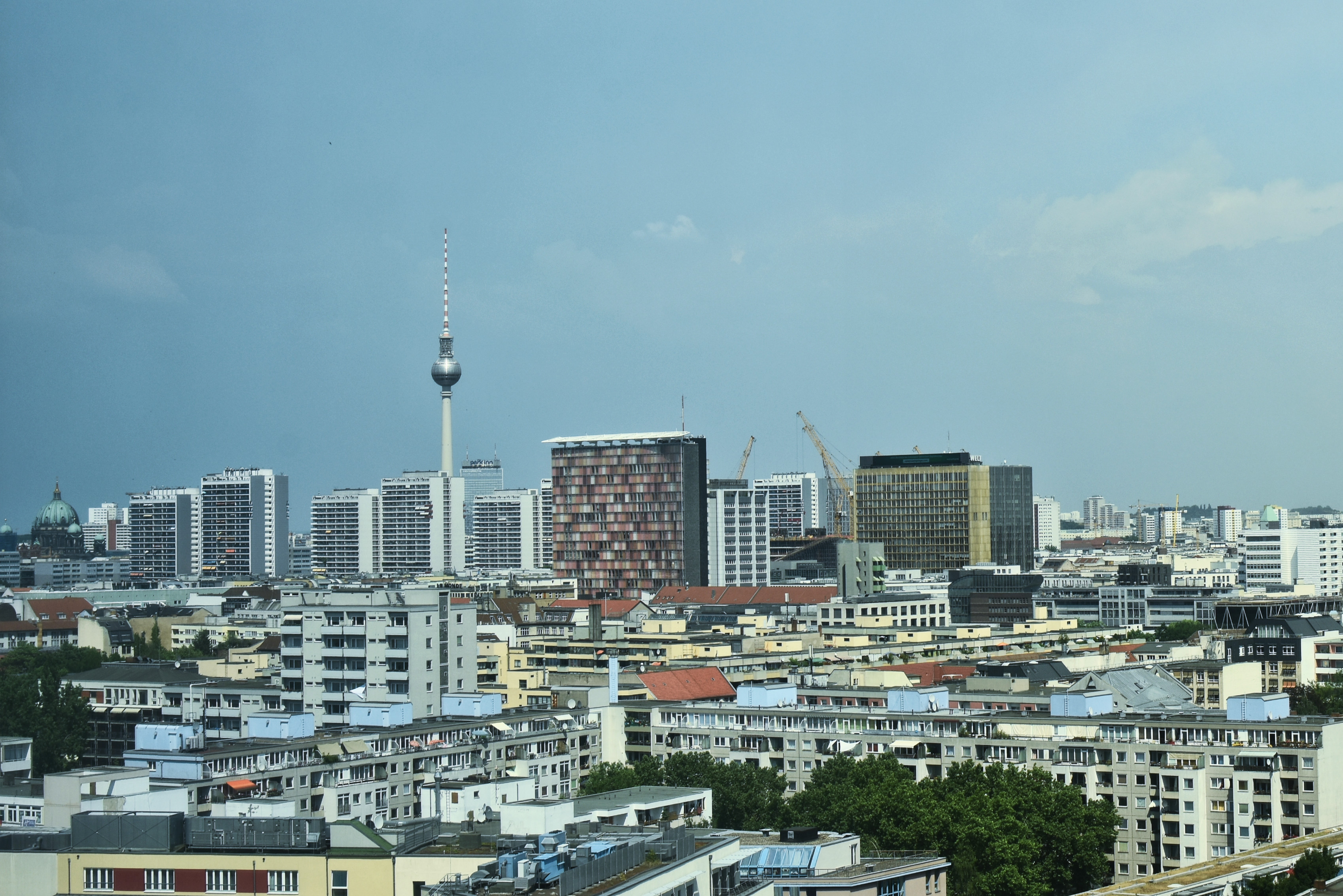
Skyline of downtown Berlin.

Germany has a number of large cities. The largest conurbation is the Rhine-Ruhr region (11 million in 2008), including Düsseldorf (the capital of North Rhine-Westphalia), Cologne, Bonn, Dortmund, Essen, Duisburg, and Bochum.

==== Netherlands ====
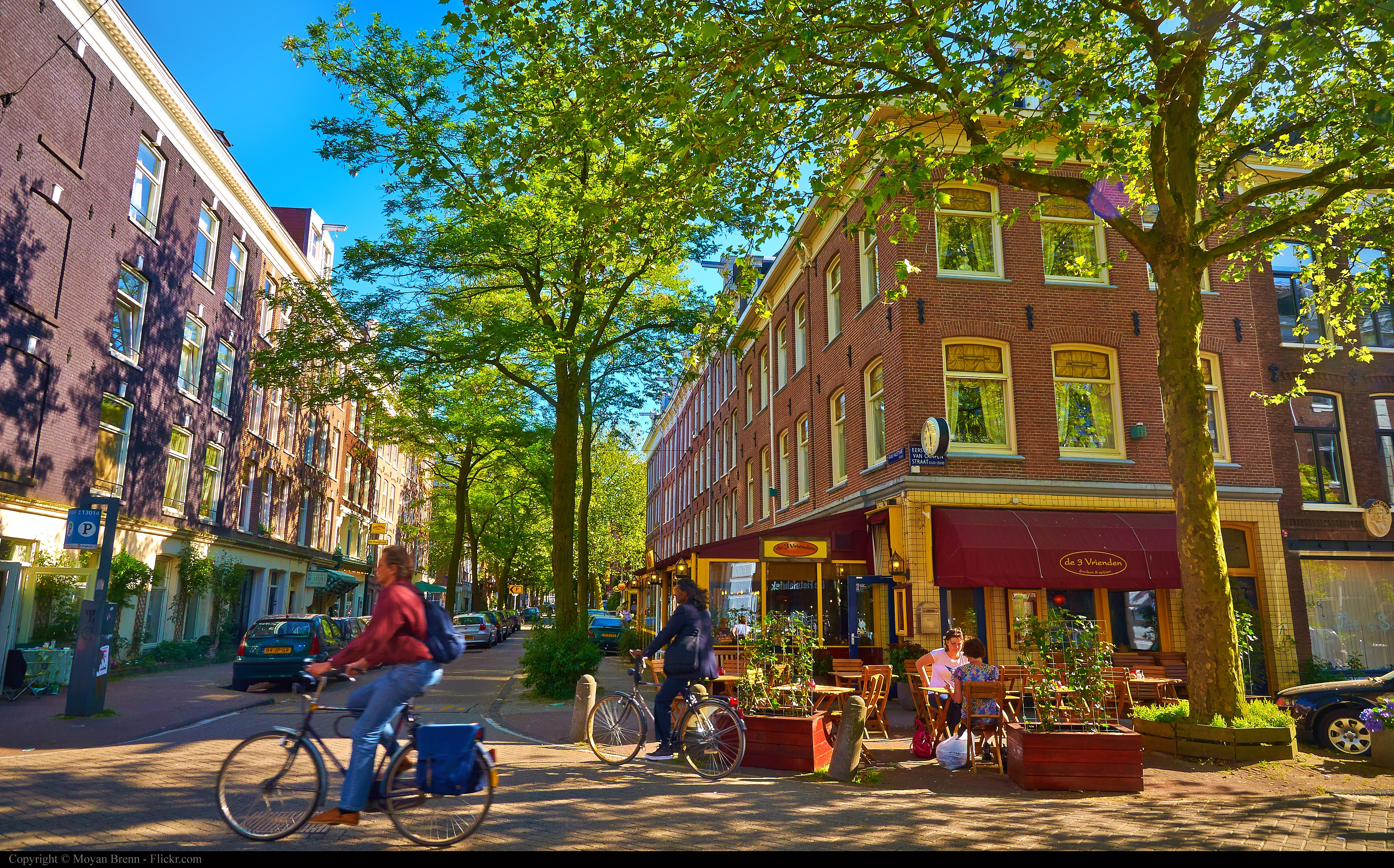
A street view of downtown Amsterdam.

The Netherlands is the 30th-most densely populated country in the world, with 404.6 inhabitants per square kilometre (1,048/sq mi)—or 497 inhabitants per square kilometre (1,287/sq mi) if only the land area is counted. The Randstad is the country's largest conurbation located in the west of the country and contains the four largest cities: Amsterdam, Rotterdam, The Hague, and Utrecht. The Randstad has a population of 7 million inhabitants and is the 6th largest metropolitan area in Europe.

==== Norway ====
Norway defines urban areas ("tettsteder") similarly to the other Nordic countries. Unlike in Denmark and Sweden, the distance between each building has to be of less than 50 m, although exceptions are made due to parks, industrial areas, rivers, and similar. Groups of houses less than 400 m from the main body of an urban area are included in the urban area.

==== Poland ====
In Poland, official "urban" population figures simply refer to those localities which have the status of towns (miasta). The "rural" population is that of all areas outside the boundaries of these towns. This distinction may give a misleading impression in some cases, since some localities with only village status may have acquired larger and denser populations than many many smaller towns with most excessive example of Poznań, most spread urban area of the country with population of the city app. 534 thousand and metropolitan area around 1 million inhabitants. On the other hand, the Katowice urban area with numerous large and medium cities covers 1,468 km and has above 2 million people. The metropolitan areas in Poland are the biggest urban zones (e.g. Katowice metropolitan area, Łódź metropolitan area and Szczecin metropolitan area) and have great impact on the rural surroundings, as it is around Lublin, Radom, Kielce, Tarnów and Białystok.

==== Russia ====
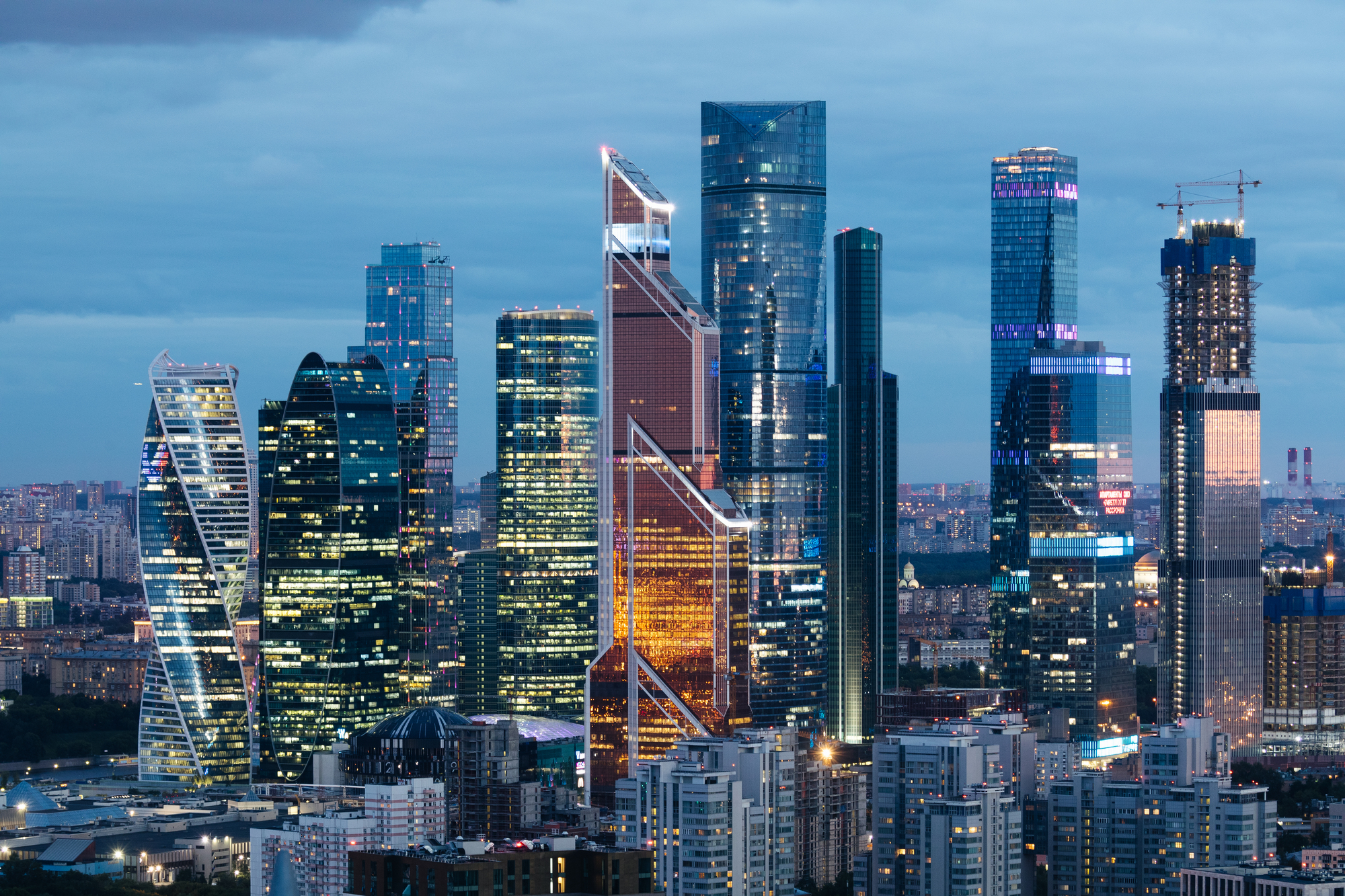
Moscow, the capital and largest city of Russia

Moscow, the capital and largest city of Russia, has a population estimated at 12.4 million residents within the city limits, while over 17 million residents in the urban area, and over 20 million residents in the Moscow Metropolitan Area. It is among the world's largest cities, being the most populous city entirely within Europe, the most populous urban area in Europe, the most populous metropolitan area in Europe, and also the largest city by land area on the European continent. Saint Petersburg, the cultural capital, is the second-largest city, with a population of roughly 5.4 million inhabitants. Other major urban areas are Yekaterinburg, Novosibirsk, Kazan, Nizhny Novgorod, and Chelyabinsk.

==== Spain ====
Spain is a very highly urbanized country. Madrid is its largest urban area. The Southern and Eastern coasts with Barcelona, Valencia and Málaga are more urbanised than the Northern and Western ones.

==== Sweden ====
Urban areas in Sweden (tätorter) are statistically defined localities, totally independent of the administrative subdivision of the country. There are 1,956 such localities in Sweden, with a population ranging from 200 to 1,372,000 inhabitants.

==== United Kingdom ====
A view of Elizabeth Tower (Often called "Big Ben") in downtown London.

In 2013 the United Kingdom's Office for National Statistics (ONS) published 2011 Built-up Areas – Methodology and Guidance which sets out its definition of a built-up area (BUA) as an area of built-up land of at least 20 hectares (0.077 sq mi), separated from other settlements by at least 200 metres (660 ft). For 2011 census data there are 5,493 built-up areas, of which 501 are divided into built-up area sub-divisions (BUASD) for which data is also available. Each built-up area is named algorithmically, using Ordnance Survey place-name data.

The ONS has produced census results from urban areas since 1951, and since 1981 based upon the extent of irreversible urban development indicated on Ordnance Survey maps. The definition is an extent of at least 20 ha and at least 1,500 census residents. Separate areas are linked if less than 200 m (220 yd) apart. Included are transportation features. The UK has five Urban Areas with a population over a million and a further sixty nine with a population over one hundred thousand.

Largest cities or towns in the United Kingdom (England and Wales: 2011 census built-up area; Scotland: 2016 estimates settlement; Northern Ireland: 2001 census urban area)
Rank	Name	Urban area	Pop.	Rank	Name	Urban area	Pop.
1	London	Greater London	9,787,426	11	Bristol	Bristol	617,280
2	Manchester	Greater Manchester	2,553,379	12	Edinburgh	Edinburgh	512,150
3	Birmingham	West Midlands	2,440,986	13	Leicester	Leicester	508,916
4	Leeds	West Yorkshire	1,777,934	14	Belfast	Belfast	483,418
5	Glasgow	Greater Glasgow	985,290	15	Brighton	Brighton & Hove	474,485
6	Liverpool	Liverpool	864,122	16	Bournemouth	South East Dorset	466,266
7	Southampton	South Hampshire	855,569	17	Cardiff	Cardiff	390,214
8	Newcastle upon Tyne	Tyneside	774,891	18	Middlesbrough	Teesside	376,633
9	Nottingham	Nottingham	729,977	19	Stoke-on-Trent	Stoke-on-Trent	372,775
10	Sheffield	Sheffield	685,368	20	Coventry	Coventry	359,262

=== North America ===
==== Canada ====
According to Statistics Canada, an urban area in Canada is an area with a population of at least 1,000 people where the density is no fewer than 400 persons per square kilometre (1,000/sq mi). If two or more urban areas are within 2 km (1.2 mi) of each other by road, they are merged into a single urban area, provided they do not cross census metropolitan area or census agglomeration boundaries.

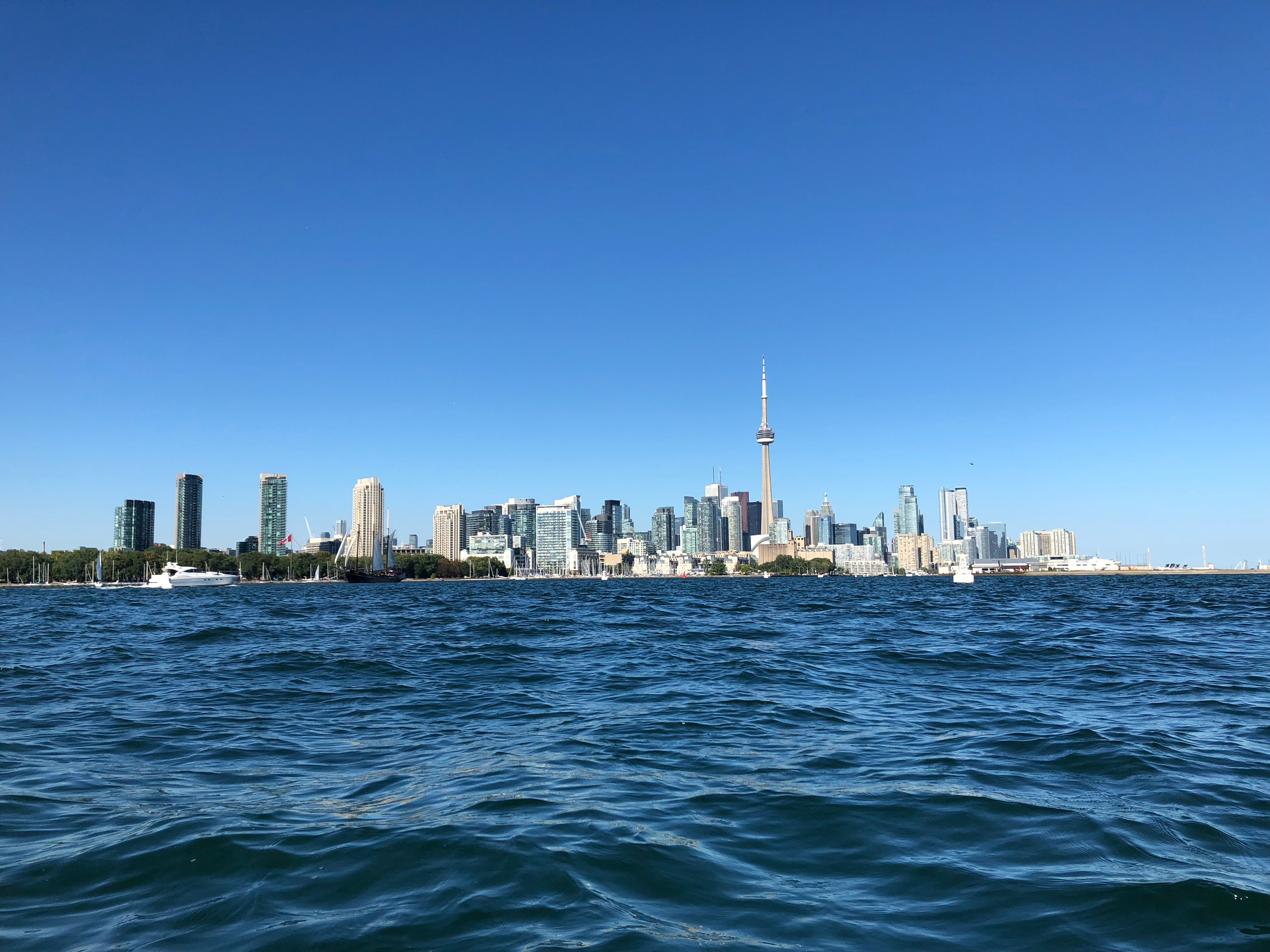
The Downtown area of Toronto.

In the Canada 2011 Census, Statistics Canada redesignated urban areas with the new term "population centre"; the new term was chosen in order to better reflect the fact that urban vs. rural is not a strict division, but rather a continuum within which several distinct settlement patterns may exist. For example, a community may fit a strictly statistical definition of an urban area, but may not be commonly thought of as "urban" because it has a smaller population, or functions socially and economically as a suburb of another urban area rather than as a self-contained urban entity, or is geographically remote from other urban communities. Accordingly, the new definition set out three distinct types of population centres: small (population 1,000 to 29,999), medium (population 30,000 to 99,999) and large (population 100,000 or greater). Despite the change in terminology, however, the demographic definition of a population centre remains unchanged from that of an urban area: a population of at least 1,000 people where the density is no fewer than 400 persons per km^{2}.

==== Mexico ====
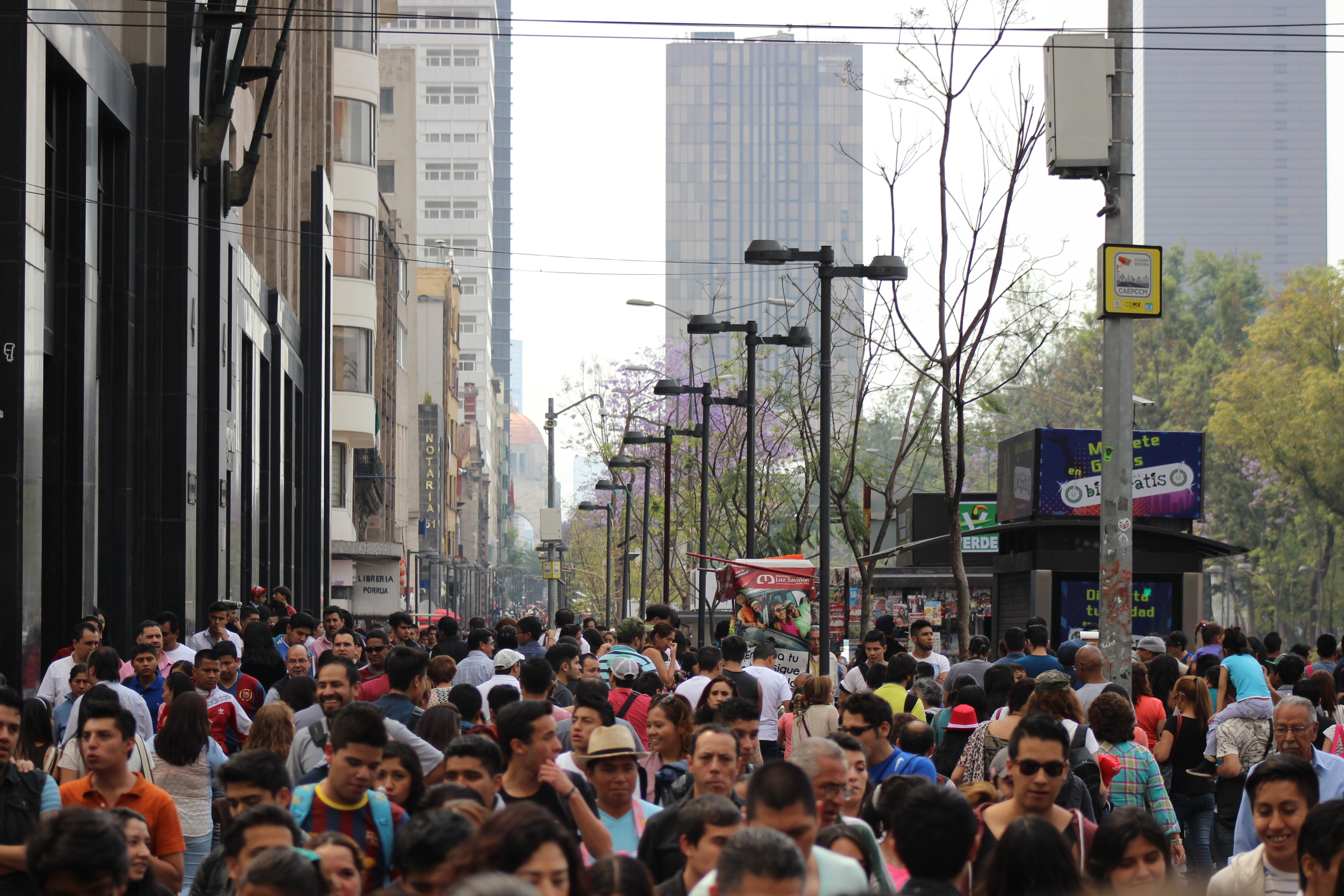
Downtown Mexico City as seen from the street.

Mexico is one of many countries where the urbanization rate is at least 80%. Mexico City, its capital, is the largest urban area in the country.

==== United States ====
In the United States, the Census Bureau defines urban areas and delineates urban area boundaries after each census. The Bureau defines an urban area as "a statistical geographic entity consisting of a densely settled core created from census blocks and contiguous qualifying territory that together have at least 2,000 housing units or 5,000 persons." There were 2,646 urban areas identified by the Census Bureau for 2020. 511 of these had a population of 50,000 or more.

For the 2000 and 2010 censuses, the Census Bureau differentiated between two kinds of urban areas: urbanized areas and urban clusters. The term urbanized area denoted an urban area of 50,000 or more people. Urban areas under 50,000 people were called urban clusters. Urbanized areas were first delineated in the United States in the 1950 census, while urban clusters were added in the 2000 census. The distinction between urbanized areas and urban clusters was removed for the 2020 census.

Urban areas consist of a densely-settled urban core, plus surrounding developed areas that meet certain density criteria. Since urban areas are composed of census blocks and not cities, counties, or county-equivalents, urban area boundaries may consist of partial areas of these political units. Urban areas are distinguished from rural areas: any area not part of an urban area is considered to be rural by the Census Bureau.

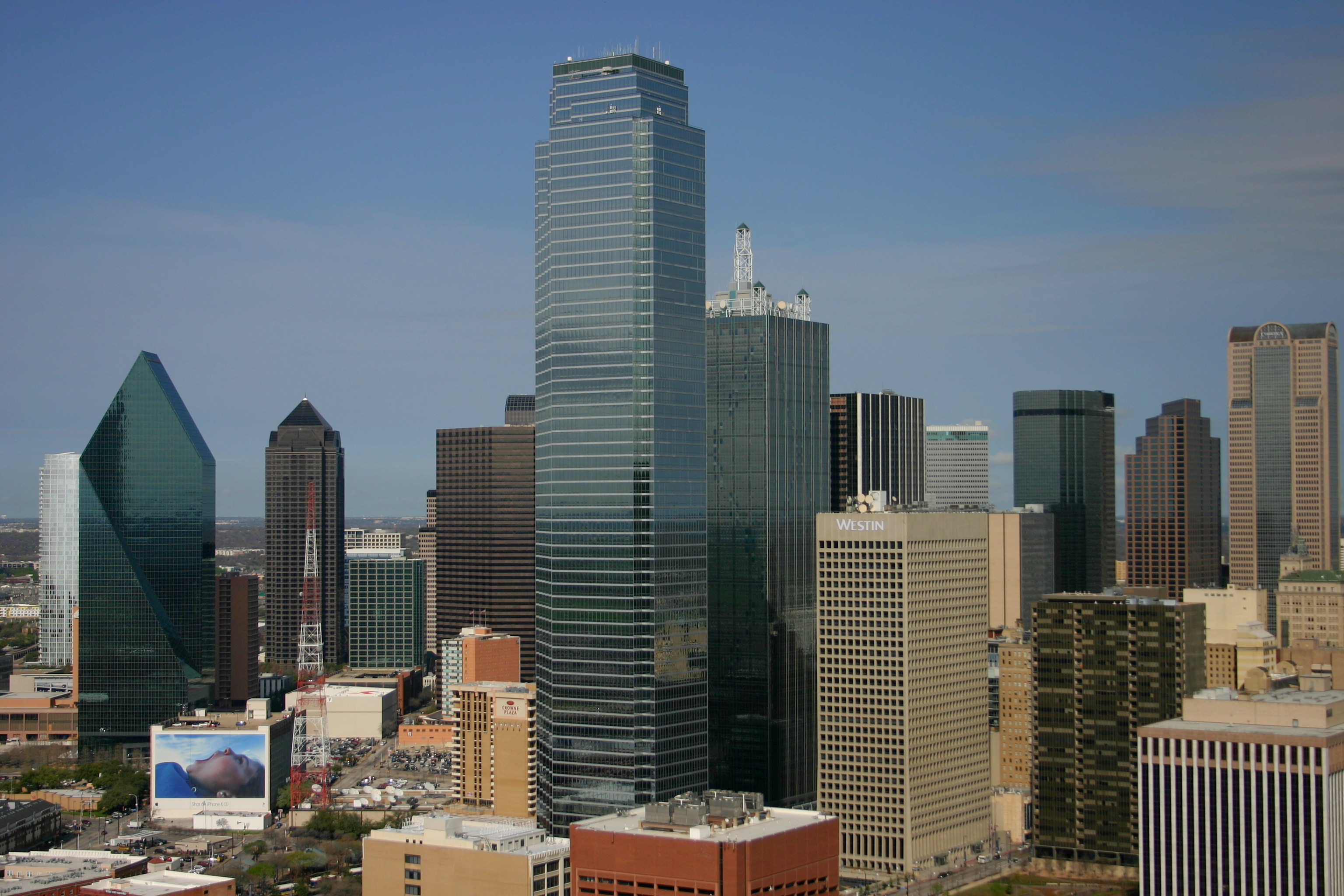
The downtown skyline of Dallas Texas.

The largest urban area in the United States is that of New York City and its surrounding suburbs. The New York–Jersey City–Newark, NY–NJ urban area had a population of 19,426,449 as of 2020, while the larger metropolitan area had a population of 20,140,470, and the combined statistical area had a population of 23,582,649. The next five largest urban areas in the U.S. are those of Los Angeles, Chicago, Miami, Houston, and Dallas. 80.0 percent of the population of the United States lives within the boundaries of an urban area as of the 2020 census.

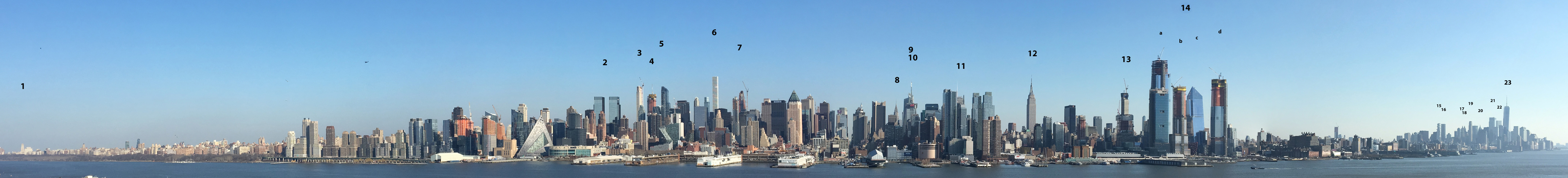
The skyscrapers of New York City, the most populous city in the United States and the most populous U.S. metropolitan area, are almost all situated in Manhattan, the world's largest central business district, seen here in this panorama in February 2018, as viewed from Weehawken, New Jersey.
1. Riverside Church
2. Time Warner Center
3. 220 Central Park South
4. Central Park Tower
5. One57
6. 432 Park Avenue
7. 53W53
8. Chrysler Building
9. Bank of America Tower
10. Conde Nast Building
11. The New York Times Building
12. Empire State Building
13. Manhattan West
14. a: 55 Hudson Yards, b: 35 Hudson Yards, c: 10 Hudson Yards, d: 15 Hudson Yards
15. 56 Leonard Street
16. 8 Spruce Street
17. Woolworth Building
18. 70 Pine Street
19. 30 Park Place
20. 40 Wall Street
21. Three World Trade Center
22. Four World Trade Center
23. One World Trade Center

The concept of Urbanized Areas as defined by the U.S. Census Bureau is often used as a more accurate gauge of the size of a city, since in different cities and states the lines between city borders and the urbanized area of that city are often not the same. For example, the city of Greenville, South Carolina has a city population just over 68,000 and an urbanized area population of around 400,000, while Greensboro, North Carolina has a city population just over 285,000 and an urbanized area population of around 300,000 — meaning that Greenville is actually "larger" for some intents and purposes, but not for others, such as taxation, local elections, etc.

In the U.S. Department of Agriculture's natural resources inventory, urban areas are officially known as developed areas or urban and built-up areas. Such areas include cities, ethnic villages, other built-up areas of more than 10 ac (4 ha), industrial sites, railroad yards, cemeteries, airports, golf courses, shooting ranges, institutional and public administration sites, and similar areas. The 1997 national resources inventory placed over 98,000,000 ac (40,000,000 ha) in this category, an increase of 25,000,000 ac (10,000,000 ha) since 1982.

=== Oceania ===
==== Australia ====
The Australian Bureau of Statistics refers to urban areas as Urban Centres, which it generally defines as population clusters of 1,000 or more people. Australia is one of the most urbanised countries in the world, with more than 50% of the population residing in Australia's three biggest urban centres.

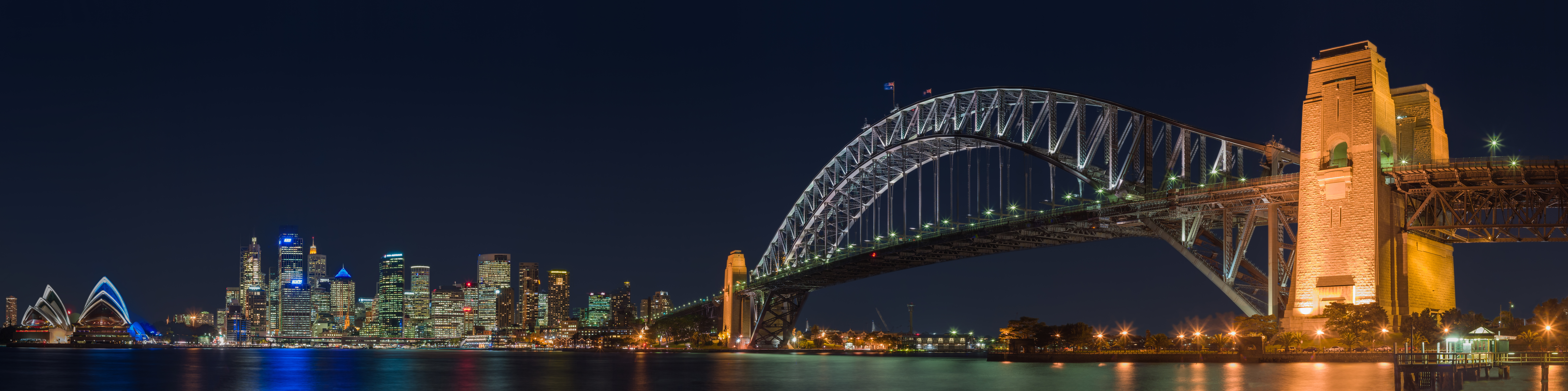
Sydney is Australia's largest city, home to 5.3 million inhabitants.

==== New Zealand ====
Statistics New Zealand defines urban areas in New Zealand, which are independent of any administrative subdivisions and have no legal basis. There are four classes of urban area: major urban areas (population 100,000+), large urban areas (population 30,000–99,999), medium urban areas (population 10,000–29,999) and small urban areas (population 1,000–9,999). As of 2021, there are 7 major urban areas, 13 large urban areas, 22 medium urban areas and 136 small urban areas. Urban areas are reclassified after each New Zealand census, so population changes between censuses does not change an urban area's classification.

Largest cities or towns in New Zealand Statistics New Zealand June 2025 estimate (SSGA18 boundaries)
Rank	Name	Region	Pop.	Rank	Name	Region	Pop.
1	Auckland	Auckland	1,547,200	11	New Plymouth	Taranaki	60,200
2	Christchurch	Canterbury	407,800	12	Porirua	Wellington	60,100
3	Wellington	Wellington	209,800	13	Rotorua	Bay of Plenty	58,500
4	Hamilton	Waikato	192,100	14	Whangārei	Northland	56,100
5	Tauranga	Bay of Plenty	160,900	15	Invercargill	Southland	51,200
6	Lower Hutt	Wellington	113,200	16	Nelson	Nelson	50,800
7	Dunedin	Otago	104,000	17	Hastings	Hawke's Bay	49,800
8	Palmerston North	Manawatū-Whanganui	81,200	18	Upper Hutt	Wellington	44,500
9	Hibiscus Coast	Auckland	67,800	19	Whanganui	Manawatū-Whanganui	42,800
10	Napier	Hawke's Bay	66,400	20	Gisborne	Gisborne	38,100

=== South America ===
==== Argentina ====
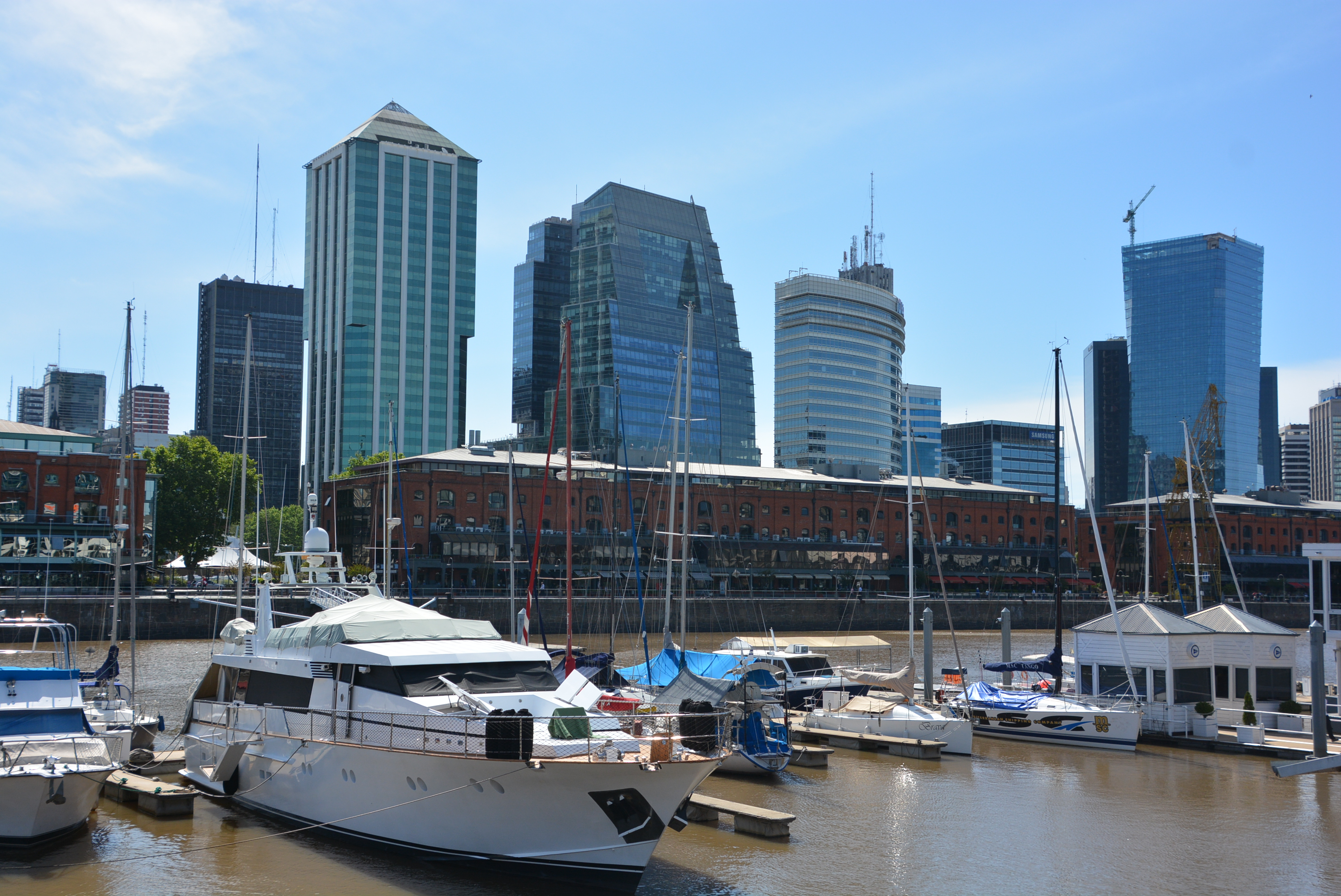
A view of downtown Buenos Aires.

Argentina is highly urbanized. The ten largest metropolitan areas account for half of the population, and fewer than one in ten live in rural areas. About 3 million people live in Buenos Aires City and the Greater Buenos Aires metropolitan area totals around 15 million, making it one of the largest urban areas in the world, with a population of 18 million all up.

Córdoba has around 1.5 million people living in the urban area, while Rosario, Mendoza and Tucumán have around 1.2 million inhabitants each and La Plata, Mar del Plata, Salta and Santa Fe have at least 500,000 people each.

==== Brazil ====
In Brazil, the terms metropolitan area (Portuguese: região metropolitana) and urban agglomeration (aglomeração urbana) have specific meanings. They are defined by federal and state legislation as collections of municipalities focused on "integrating the organization, planning and execution of public functions of common interest". An integrated development area (região integrada de desenvolvimento) is one of the two above structures that crosses state (or Federal District) boundaries.

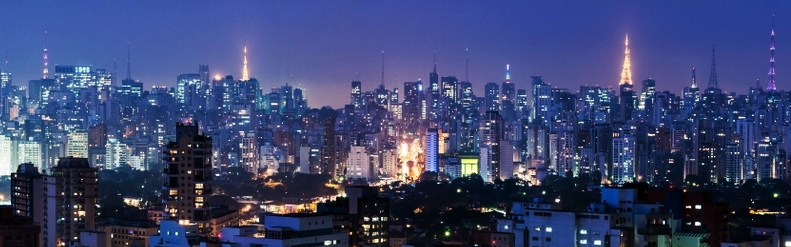
Skyline of São Paulo, the largest city in Brazil

Largest urban agglomerations in Brazil 2022 Census - IBGE
Rank	Name	State	Pop.	Rank	Name	State	Pop.
1	São Paulo	São Paulo	20,673,280	11	Manaus	Amazonas	2,063,689
2	Rio de Janeiro	Rio de Janeiro	11,760,550	12	Campinas	São Paulo	2,093,118
3	Belo Horizonte	Minas Gerais	4,963,704	13	Belém	Pará	1,957,533
4	Brasília	Federal District	3,858,760	14	Vitória	Espírito Santo	1,756,172
5	Recife	Pernambuco	3,783,639	15	Baixada Santista	São Paulo	1,672,991
6	Porto Alegre	Rio Grande do Sul	3,679,298	16	São José dos Campos	São Paulo	1,589,875
7	Fortaleza	Ceará	3,424,978	17	São Luís	Maranhão	1,458,836
8	Curitiba	Paraná	3,382,210	18	Natal	Rio Grande do Norte	1,263,738
9	Salvador	Bahia	3,320,568	19	Maceió	Alagoas	1,194,596
10	Goiânia	Goiás	2,481,043	20	Florianópolis	Santa Catarina	1,183,874

==== Chile ====
Chile is highly urbanized. The largest urban area in the country is its capital, Santiago.

== See also ==
- City
- Developed environments
- List of largest urban areas by continent
- New Urbanism
- Urban climatology
- Urban culture
- Urban decay
- Urban forest
- Urban forestry
- Urban green space
- Urban planning
- Urban renewal
- Urban vitality
- Urbanization

== Sources ==
- This article incorporates text from a free content work. Licensed under CC BY 4.0 (license statement/permission). Text taken from The State of the World’s Land and Water Resources for Food and Agriculture 2025, Food and Agriculture Organization of the United Nations (FAO).
