= Setha Low =

American anthropologist (born 1948)

- Low in 2020
- Born: March 14, 1948 (age 78); Los Angeles, California, U.S.
- Title: Distinguished Professor of Psychology, Anthropology, Earth and Environmental Sciences
- Spouse: Joel Lefkowitz
- Awards: Guggenheim Fellowship (1996); Anthony Leeds Prize (2001)

Academic background
- Education: Pitzer College (B.A.); University of California, Berkeley (M.A., Ph.D.)

Academic work
- Discipline: Anthropology; Environmental psychology
- Institutions: University of Pennsylvania (1976–1988); Graduate Center, CUNY (1989–present)
- Main interests: Public space, anthropology of space and place, gated communities, urban anthropology
- Notable works: On the Plaza (2000); Behind the Gates (2003); Why Public Space Matters (2023)

Setha M. Low (born March 14, 1948) is an American anthropologist and environmental psychologist who studies public space. She is Distinguished Professor of psychology, anthropology, earth and environmental sciences, and women's and gender studies at the Graduate Center of the City University of New York, and has directed its Public Space Research Group since 1995. Low served as president of the American Anthropological Association from 2007 to 2009. She began her career in medical anthropology before moving to the study of space and place after her fieldwork on the central plazas of San José, Costa Rica, published as On the Plaza (2000). Her later books include Behind the Gates (2003), an ethnography of gated communities, and Why Public Space Matters (2023).

== Early life and education ==
Low was born in Los Angeles on March 14, 1948, and grew up there. Her stepfather was an actor, and her mother kept a gift shop and painted. Low studied psychology and human biology at Pitzer College, graduated in 1969, and took an M.A. (1971) and a Ph.D. (1976) in anthropology at the University of California, Berkeley.

== Career ==
Low taught at the University of Pennsylvania from 1976 to 1988, holding appointments in landscape architecture and regional planning, city planning, and anthropology. From 1980 to 1987 she co-directed the university's medical anthropology program, and the University of Pennsylvania awarded her an honorary master's degree in 1983. The University of Costa Rica named her professor ad honorem in 1986.

She moved to the Graduate Center of the City University of New York in 1989 as Professor of environmental psychology and anthropology. Low chaired the Graduate Center's environmental psychology program from 1994 to 1996, and in 1995 became director of the Public Space Research Group. (Note: A collaborative that conducts ethnographic studies of parks and other public spaces.) She later took on other appointments in earth and environmental sciences and in women's and gender studies, and was appointed Distinguished Professor.

Low served as president-elect and then president of the Society for Urban, National and Transnational/Global Anthropology, a section of the American Anthropological Association, between 1996 and 2002. She was president of the association itself from 2007 to 2009, and deputy chair of the World Council of Anthropological Associations from 2012 to 2014. Her research has been supported by a Fulbright research fellowship (1986–1987), a National Endowment for the Humanities fellowship at the John Carter Brown Library (1989–1990), and a Guggenheim Fellowship (1996). In 2002–2003 she was a Conservation Guest Scholar at the Getty Conservation Institute.

The American Anthropological Association presents an annual Setha M. Low Engaged Anthropology Award, funded by a gift from Low, to anthropologists or projects that apply the discipline to social justice problems.

== Research work ==
Low's early research work was in San José, Costa Rica. She studied the country's health care system and nervios (nerves), a complaint she analyzed as culturally interpreted symptoms rather than a discrete disease. She published Culture, Politics, and Medicine in Costa Rica in 1985. A second project followed, with the biological anthropologist Francis Johnston, investigated child growth, development, and malnutrition in Guatemala City. This resulted in their book Children of the Urban Poor appearing in 1995.

=== Plazas and the anthropology of space ===
Low did fieldwork in two central plazas of San José, the Parque Central and the Plaza de la Cultura. She combined ethnography with methods from planning, architecture, and environmental psychology. In a 1995 article she argued from colonial maps and archaeological evidence that the Spanish American plaza descended from Mesoamerican and Caribbean architectural traditions as well as European ones. A 1996 article, "Spatializing Culture", distinguished the social production of space (the political and economic processes that shape the built environment) from its social construction through everyday use and meaning.

She published the plaza research as On the Plaza: The Politics of Public Space and Culture (2000), which won the Anthony Leeds Prize in urban anthropology. In 2017 she returned to spatial theory with Spatializing Culture: The Ethnography of Space and Place, a synthesis of her work on how culture takes spatial form.

=== Gated communities and security ===
Low began studying gated communities after a visit around 1992 to her sister, whose new neighborhood was private in its entirety, down to the streets and sidewalks. She interviewed residents of gated developments in Texas, New York, and Mexico, work that produced the article "The Edge and the Center: Gated Communities and the Discourse of Urban Fear" (2001) and the book Behind the Gates: Life, Security, and the Pursuit of Happiness in Fortress America (2003). Some residents told her they had moved behind the gates to be safe from crime. Low found that there was no less crime inside than outside, and that residents did not feel more secure. The columnist Eugene Robinson discussed these findings in The Washington Post after she presented them at the American Anthropological Association's 2007 annual meeting.

Low later studied security more broadly with the anthropologist Mark Maguire. They co-edited Spaces of Security (2019), and their book Trapped: Life under Security Capitalism and How to Escape It (2024) profiles the police officers, policymakers, and private contractors behind what the authors call security capitalism.

=== Urban parks and public space ===
Much of the Public Space Research Group's early work was applied. Under contract with the National Park Service, Low and her colleagues produced ethnographic studies of Ellis Island, Independence National Historical Park in Philadelphia, and Jacob Riis Park in New York, using a rapid ethnographic assessment procedure (REAP) to bring park users' perspectives into planning decisions. Rethinking Urban Parks: Public Space and Cultural Diversity (2005), written with Dana Taplin and Suzanne Scheld, asked why particular groups stop using particular parks and proposed "social sustainability" as a measure of how well parks serve their surrounding communities. In the Journal of the Royal Anthropological Institute, Paige West found its case studies "detailed and beautifully written". Renia Ehrenfeucht wrote in Urban Affairs Review that the book "makes a needed inroad", though Talja Blokland, reviewing it for the Journal of Urban Design, doubted that it rethought park theory as much as its title promised. U.S. News & World Report covered the group's park research in 2008.

Low also co-edited The Politics of Public Space (2006) with the geographer Neil Smith. After the September 11 attacks she studied the recovery of public life in Battery Park City, with support from the Russell Sage Foundation, and wrote on the memorialization of the World Trade Center site.

=== Why Public Space Matters and beaches ===
Her book, Why Public Space Matters (2023) is based on about thirty years of her fieldwork. Low argues that public spaces foster civic and social life, and its final chapter sets out a method readers can use to study their own local public spaces. Jordi Honey-Rosés wrote that it makes "a compelling case for the need to invest in and steward our public spaces" for a general audience. Linjie Zhang asked why the book stops at open-air spaces (museums, galleries, and libraries go unexamined) while predicting it would attract readers well beyond the academy. Patricia Aelbrecht called it "ground-breaking".

== Visual art ==
Low is also a sculptor, print-maker, and painter. She took a ceramics class in Bridgehampton in 2002 and has since shown work in group and juried exhibitions in East Hampton, Southampton, and New York City, including a 2011 solo exhibition, Global Bodies, at the Crazy Monkey Gallery in Amagansett, New York.

== Personal life ==
Low is married to Joel Lefkowitz, a professor of industrial-organizational psychology. They have homes in Park Slope, Brooklyn, and in the Northwest Woods of East Hampton, New York.

== Awards and honors ==
- 1983 – Honorary M.A., University of Pennsylvania
- 1986 – Professor ad honorem, University of Costa Rica
- 1996 – Guggenheim Fellowship, in architecture, planning and design
- 2000 – Robert B. Textor and Family Prize for Excellence in Anticipatory Anthropology, American Anthropological Association, for On the Plaza
- 2001 – Anthony Leeds Prize, for On the Plaza
- 2001 – Victor Turner Prize for Ethnographic Writing, honorable mention, for On the Plaza
- 2016 – Prize for Distinguished Achievement in the Critical Study of North America, Society for the Anthropology of North America
- 2018 – The Athena Accolade Award.
- 2021 – Distinguished Career Award of the Environmental Design Association.

== Selected publications ==
- Low, Setha M. (1985). Culture, Politics, and Medicine in Costa Rica. Redgrave.
- Altman, Irwin; Low, Setha M., eds. (1992). Place Attachment. Plenum Press.
- Low, Setha M.; Johnston, Francis (1995). Children of the Urban Poor: The Sociocultural Environment of Growth, Development, and Malnutrition in Guatemala City. Westview Press.
- Low, Setha M., ed. (1999). Theorizing the City: The New Urban Anthropology Reader. Rutgers University Press.
- Low, Setha M. (2000). On the Plaza: The Politics of Public Space and Culture. University of Texas Press. ISBN 978-0-292-74714-2.
- Low, Setha M.; Lawrence-Zúñiga, Denise, eds. (2003). The Anthropology of Space and Place: Locating Culture. Blackwell.
- Low, Setha (2003). Behind the Gates: Life, Security, and the Pursuit of Happiness in Fortress America. Routledge. ISBN 978-0-415-94438-0.
- Low, Setha; Taplin, Dana; Scheld, Suzanne (2005). Rethinking Urban Parks: Public Space and Cultural Diversity. University of Texas Press. ISBN 978-0-292-71254-6.
- Low, Setha; Smith, Neil, eds. (2006). The Politics of Public Space. Routledge.
- Gieseking, Jen Jack; Mangold, William; Katz, Cindi; Low, Setha; Saegert, Susan, eds. (2014). The People, Place, and Space Reader. Routledge.
- Low, Setha (2017). Spatializing Culture: The Ethnography of Space and Place. Routledge. ISBN 978-1-138-94561-6.
- Low, Setha; Maguire, Mark, eds. (2019). Spaces of Security: Ethnographies of Securityscapes, Surveillance, and Control. New York University Press.
- Low, Setha, ed. (2019). The Routledge Handbook of Anthropology and the City. Routledge.
- Low, Setha (2023). Why Public Space Matters. Oxford University Press. ISBN 978-0-19-754373-3.
- Maguire, Mark; Low, Setha (2024). Trapped: Life under Security Capitalism and How to Escape It. Stanford University Press. ISBN 978-1-5036-3296-7.
- Low, Setha, ed. (2025). Beach Politics: Social, Racial, and Environmental Injustice on the Shoreline. New York University Press. ISBN 978-1-4798-2195-2.
