= Urban anthropology =

Subset of anthropology

Urban anthropology is a field within anthropology concerned with the study of large scale communities. Prior to the 1960s anthropology focused almost entirely on small scale communities. Ulf Hannerz quotes a 1960s remark that traditional anthropologists were "a notoriously agoraphobic lot, anti-urban by definition". Various social processes in the Western World as well as in the "Third World" (the latter being the habitual focus of attention of anthropologists) brought the attention of "specialists in 'other cultures'" closer to their homes.

== Urban anthropology and sociology ==
In the 20th century, urban anthropology was heavily influenced by sociology, especially the Chicago School. The difference between sociology and anthropology was that the former was traditionally conceived as the study of civilized populations, whilst anthropology was approached as the study of primitive populations. There were, in addition, methodological differences between these two disciplines—sociologists would normally study a large population sample while anthropologists relied on qualitative research with small samples, such as in-person interviews and participant observation. As interest in urban societies increased, methodology between these two fields and subject matters began to blend, leading some to question the differences between urban sociology and urban anthropology. The lines between the two fields have blurred with the interchange of ideas and methodology, to the advantage and advancement of both disciplines.

While for a long-time urban anthropology has not been officially acknowledged in the mainstream discipline, anthropologists have been conducting work in the area for a long time. Anthropologists, like sociologists, have attempted to define exactly what the city is and pinpoint the ways in which urbanism sets apart modern city lifestyles from what used to be regarded as the "primitive society". It is increasingly acknowledged in urban anthropology that, although there are significant differences in the characteristics and forms of organization of urban and non-urban communities, there are also important similarities, insofar as the city can also be conceived in anthropological studies as a form of community. Urban anthropology is an expansive and continuously evolving area of research. With a different playing field, anthropologists have had to modify their methods and even readdress traditional ethics in order to adjust to different obstacles and expectations.

== History of the discipline ==
In its early stages during the 19th century, anthropology was principally concerned with the comparative study of foreign (i.e. non-Western) cultures, which were frequently regarded as exotic and primitive. The attitude of ethnographers towards the subject of study was one of supposed scientific detachment, as they undertook the – self-serving and Eurocentric – mission of identifying, classifying and arranging cultural groups worldwide into clearly defined socio-cultural evolutionist stages of human development.

During the 20th century, several factors began leading more anthropologists away from the bipolar notions of foreign savagery versus Western civilization and more towards the study of urban cultures in general. A strong influence in this direction was the discovery of vast regions of the world thanks to a significant increase in human mobility, which had been brought about, among other factors, by the fast expansion of the rail network and the popularisation of travel in the late Victorian era. This meant that, by the mid 20th century, it was generally perceived that there were relatively few undiscovered “exotic” cultures left to study through “first contact” encounters.

Moreover, after World War I, a number of developing nations began to emerge. Some anthropologists were attracted to the study of these “peasant societies”, which were essentially different from the “folk societies” that ethnographers had traditionally researched. Robert Redfield was a prominent anthropologist who studied both folk and peasant societies. While researching peasant societies of developing nations, such as India, he discovered that these communities were dissimilar to folk societies in that they were not self-contained. For example, peasant societies were economically linked to forces outside their own community. In other words, they were part of a larger society — the city.

This realisation opened the door to more anthropologists focusing their study of societies (regardless of whether they were Western or non-Western) from the perspective of the city (conceived as a structuring element). This crossover was instrumental in the development of urban anthropology as an independent field. Clearly, this was not the first occasion on which the social sciences had expressed an interest in the study of the city. For instance, archaeology already placed a strong emphasis on the exploration of the origins of urbanism, and anthropology itself had adopted the notion of the city as a referent in the study of what was referred to as pre-industrial society.

A significant development in the anthropological study of the city was the research conducted by the Chicago School of Urban Ecology. As early as the 1920s, the school defined the city, in terms of urban ecology, as “made up of adjacent ecological niches accompanied by human groups in... rings surrounding the core.” The Chicago School became a main reference in urban anthropology, setting theoretical trends that have influenced the discipline until the present day.

Among the various individual scholars who contributed to laying the foundations for what urban anthropology has become today (i.e. the study of the city conceived as a community) was the sociologist Louis Wirth. His essay “Urbanism as a Way of Life” proved to be essential in distinguishing urbanism as a unique form of society that could be studied from three perspectives: “a physical structure, as a system of social organization, and as a set of attitudes and ideas.” Another notable academic in the field of urban anthropology, Lloyd Warner, led the “Community Study” approach and was one of the first anthropologists to unequivocally transition from the exploration of primitive cultures (the aborigines in his case) to studying urban cities using similar anthropological methods. The Community Study approach was an important influence leading to the study of the city as a community. William Whyte later expanded Warner’s methods for small urban centres in his study of larger neighbourhoods.

== Methods, techniques and ethics ==
Anthropologists typically have one significant difference from their affiliated field of science: their method of gathering information. Scientists prefer research design, where defined independent and dependent variables are used. Anthropologists, however, prefer the ethnographic method,. With urban anthropology, the subject is exactingly broad as it is, there needs to be a degree and channel of control. For this reason, urban anthropologists find it easier to incorporate research design in their methods and usually define the city as either the independent variable or the dependent variable. So, the study would be conducted on either the city as the factor on some measure, such as immigration, or the city as something that is responding to some measure.

A common technique used by anthropologists is “myth debunking.” In this process, anthropologists present a specific question and conduct a study to either verify or negate its validity. Research design is actually an important part of this process, allowing anthropologists to present a specific question and answer it. Being able to hone into such a broad subject specifically while remaining holistic is largely the reason why this technique is popular among anthropologists.

Another technique is based on how anthropologists conduct their studies; they either use single case studies or controlled comparisons. By using case studies, they present and analyze a single urban society. The more sophisticated method is using controlled comparisons, where different societies are compared with controlled variables so that the associations are more valid and not merely correlations. In order to conduct either type of study, the anthropologist must define a basic unit, which is the ethnographic target population. The target population can be central to the research question, but not necessarily; for example, when studying migrant immigration, the people are being studied, not the neighbourhoods. Common ways to define target populations that are central to the research design are by spatial boundaries, common cultures, or common work.

Ethics largely remain the same for all anthropologists. Still, working in an urban setting and a more complex society raises new issues. The societies that anthropologists are now studying are more similar to their own, and familiarity raises issues concerning objectivity. The best idea is for an anthropologist to identify his or her own values explicitly and adapt to a society based on what he or she is studying. With primitive societies, it would have been acceptable for an anthropologist to enter the society and explain at the beginning their intentions of studying the society. In urban cultures, however, they are not in what are considered alien cultures. Therefore, an anthropologist finds that a more detailed explanation of their intentions is needed and often finds that their intent must be explained multiple times throughout the study.

== Main areas of study ==
There are two main ways to go about researching urban anthropology: by examining the types of cities or examining the social issues within the cities. These two methods are overlapping and dependent of each other. By defining different types of cities, one would use social factors as well as economic and political factors to categorize the cities. By directly looking at the different social issues, one would also be studying how they affect the dynamic of the city.

There are four central approaches to the anthropological study of cities. The first is the urban ecology model in which the community and family network are central. The second is based on power and knowledge, specifically of how the city is planned. The third approach is studying local and supralocal and the link between the two degrees of units in the city. The last approach focuses on cities where political economy is central to the city’s infrastructure. Low uses several prominent studies from urban anthropologists to compile a list of the different types of cities that do not fall into only one category, and what factors individualize them. These types of cities include those focused on religious, economic, and social processes. An example of the religious city is what Low calls the “sacred city” in which religion is central to the daily life processes of the city. An example of an economic-centered city image is the “Deindustrialized city”. In America, this type of city is usually found in areas where coal mining was the main industry in the city, and once coal mines were shut down, the city became a ghost city rampant with unemployment and displaced workers. Globalization has been studied as a force that severely affects these areas, and anthropological studies have greatly increased the knowledge of the implications.

Other types of cities include, but are certainly not limited to the contested city, in which urban resistance is a key image; the gendered city, dominant in urbanizing areas such as Africa where women find themselves newly employed in low-wage labour; postmodern city, that is centred on capitalism; and fortress city, where different populations within the city are separated, usually based on socioeconomic factors. The main reasons for the current studies focusing on types of cities are to understand the patterns in which cities are now developing in, to study theoretical cities that may come about in the future based on these current trends, and to increase the implications of anthropological studies. Anthropological studies have serious implications on the understanding of urban society: with the rapid rate of globalization, many peasant societies are quickly attempting to modernize their cities and populations, but at an expense of the interests of the people within the cities. Studies can illustrate these negative effects and project how the overall city will fare poorly in the future.

The other method of studying urban anthropology is by studying various factors, such as social, economic, and political processes, within the general city. Focuses on these factors include studies on rural-urban migration, kinship in the city, problems that arise from urbanism, and social stratification. These studies are largely comparative between how these relations function in an urban setting versus how they function in a rural setting. When studying kinship, anthropologists have been focusing on the importance of extended family for urban natives versus migrants. Studies have shown, generally, that the more “native” one becomes with the urban city, the less importance is placed on maintaining familial relations. Another important and commonly studied aspect of the urban society is poverty, which is believed to be a problem that arises out of urbanism. Urban anthropologists study several aspects individually and attempt to tie different aspects together, such as the relationship between poverty and social stratification.

== See also ==
- Rural-Urban gradient
- Urban Sociology
- Urban vitality
