= List of largest urban areas by continent =

Top ten most populous urban areas of each continent

This is a list of the largest urban areas by continent. For comparison purposes, a list of the largest urban areas in the world is also included.

== Largest urban areas ==
=== Africa ===
1. (Egypt) Cairo – 20,901,000
2. (Nigeria) Lagos – 15,946,000
3. (Democratic Republic of the Congo) Kinshasa – 14,342,000
4. (Angola) Luanda – 8,330,000
5. (Tanzania) Dar es Salaam – 6,702,000
6. (Sudan) Khartoum – 5,829,000
7. (South Africa) Johannesburg – 5,783,000
8. (Egypt) Alexandria – 5,281,000
9. (Ivory Coast) Abidjan – 5,203,000
10. (Ethiopia) Addis Ababa – 4,794,000

=== Asia ===
1. (Japan) Tokyo – 37,393,000
2. (Indonesia) Jakarta – 35,386,000
3. (India) New Delhi – 30,291,000
4. (China) Shanghai – 27,058,000
5. (Bangladesh) Dhaka – 21,006,000
6. (China) Beijing – 20,463,000
7. (India) Mumbai – 20,411,000
8. (Japan) Osaka – 19,165,000
9. (Pakistan) Karachi – 16,094,000
10. (China) Chongqing – 15,872,000

=== Europe ===
1. (Russia) Moscow – 19,100,000
2. (France) Paris – 10,890,000
3. (Turkey) Istanbul – 10,042,000
4. (United Kingdom) London – 9,787,000
5. (Spain) Madrid – 6,211,000
6. (Russia) Saint Petersburg – 5,869,000
7. (Spain) Barcelona – 5,489,000
8. (Italy) Milan – 5,471,000
9. (Germany) Berlin – 4,679,000
10. (Italy) Rome – 3,800,000

=== North America ===
1. Mexico City – 21,782,000
2. (United States) New York–Newark – 18,804,000
3. (United States) Los Angeles–Long Beach–Santa Ana – 12,447,000
4. (United States) Chicago – 8,865,000
5. (United States) Houston – 6,371,000
6. (United States) Dallas–Fort Worth – 6,301,000
7. (Canada) Toronto – 6,197,000
8. (United States) Miami – 6,122,000
9. (United States) Atlanta – 5,803,000
10. (United States) Philadelphia – 5,717,000

==== Central America and the Caribbean ====
1. (Dominican Republic) Santo Domingo – 4,759,145
2. Guatemala City – 3,095,000
3. (Haiti) Port-au-Prince – 2,987,000
4. (Puerto Rico) San Juan – 2,440,000
5. (Cuba) Havana – 2,149,000
6. Panama City – 1,977,000
7. (Honduras) Tegucigalpa – 1,568,000
8. (Costa Rica) San José – 1,462,000
9. (El Salvador) San Salvador – 1,116,000
10. (Nicaragua) Managua – 1,095,000

=== Oceania ===
1. (Australia) Melbourne – 4,968,000
2. (Australia) Sydney – 4,926,000
3. (Australia) Brisbane – 2,406,000
4. (Australia) Perth – 2,042,000
5. (New Zealand) Auckland – 1,607,000
6. (Australia) Adelaide – 1,336,000
7. (Australia) Gold Coast–Tweed Heads – 699,000
8. (Australia) Canberra – 457,000
9. (Australia) Newcastle–Maitland – 450,000
10. (New Zealand) Wellington – 415,000

=== South America ===
1. (Brazil) São Paulo – 22,043,000
2. (Argentina) Buenos Aires – 15,154,000
3. (Brazil) Rio de Janeiro – 13,458,000
4. (Colombia) Bogotá – 10,978,000
5. (Peru) Lima – 10,719,000
6. (Chile) Santiago – 6,767,000
7. (Brazil) Belo Horizonte – 6,084,000
8. (Brazil) Brasília – 4,646,000
9. (Brazil) Porto Alegre – 4,137,000
10. (Brazil) Recife – 4,127,000

=== World ===
1. (Indonesia) Jakarta– 42,913,860
2. (Bangladesh) Dhaka– 36,585,479
3. (Japan) Tokyo– 33,412,512
4. (India) Delhi – 30,222,405
5. (China) Shanghai – 29,558 908
6. (China) Guangzhou – 27,563,372
7. (Egypt) Cairo – 25,556,102
8. (Philippines) Manila – 24,735,305
9. (India) Kolkata – 22,549,738
10. (South Korea) Seoul – 22,490,482
