= Rural-Urban gradient =

The Rural-Urban gradient is a gradient that is used to describe how Anthropocene effects affect their surroundings and how they compare to areas less affected by Anthropocene effects. Effects such as but, not limited to disturbance, change in biota, pollution, and landscape modification. Mainly used in the context of ecosystem services, it has also been used to describe biodiversity along the gradient, as well as behavioral change.

== Research ==
Individual research on the topic is often done by taking multiple samples along a transect from a city center and working outwards. At first, research mainly focused on characteristics involved in land cover structures, the biota of the rural-urban areas and socio-economic structures. However, nowadays research also focuses on many ecosystem services, as well as on biodiversity and evolution.

== Ecosystem services ==
In ecosystem services, rural-urban gradients have shown Anthropocene effects affecting their surroundings in multiple ways. For example, research has shown that energy consumption increases with increased population and industrialization. As of now, there is no clear pattern on how ecosystem services are affected by the rural-urban gradient, as it still differs widely between different cities and is dependent on other factors.

== Biodiversity ==
In biodiversity, the rural-urban gradient is sometimes also used to describe the species richness distribution along the gradient. It is known that for most groups of organisms when urbanization is high, species richness decreases. However, when urbanization is at a low to medium level, species richness tends to increase. These are mostly suburban, low-density housing and there are several reasons why the species richness tends to be higher there. For instance, the large presence of private gardens. In these gardens, a great floral diversity exists, largely mostly existing of non-native plants. This, combined with the combined size of all the gardens, creates a large, diverse floral area, attracting more fauna than the more urbanized cores of cities. In return, this also creates a greater species richness than both the more urbanized city cores, as well as the rural lands further away from the city.

Another factor of biodiversity on the rural-urban gradient is the effect of invasive and introduced species. With an increase in human activity comes a greater introduction of non-native species. This, combined with research that traffic corridors help to disperse non-native species, makes that non-native species also follow a rural-urban gradient, with the highest concentration in the cities and lower concentrations as you go outwards from the city.

== In evolution ==
The rural-urban gradient is also studied in the light of evolution. Research on the common sparrow (Passer domesticus) has shown that populations along a rural-urban gradient can also genetically differentiate from one another over relatively small distances. In contrast, research on the black-headed gull (Chroicocephalus ridibundus) has shown that this genetic differentiation does not always appear along a rural-urban gradient, as the research did not show any significant difference between the genetic make-up of urban and rural populations.

== Behavior ==
In behavioral biology, the rural-urban gradient has mainly been studied in the context of songbirds. Research on European blackbirds (Turdus merula) has shown that there is a significant variation of songs of the European blackbird along a rural-urban gradient. This is probably to avoid the song from being masked by the background noises. However, since the different populations are not isolated, it is unclear whether this is an evolutionary change or part of behavioral plasticity.
