= Joel Lefkowitz =

American industrial-organizational psychologist

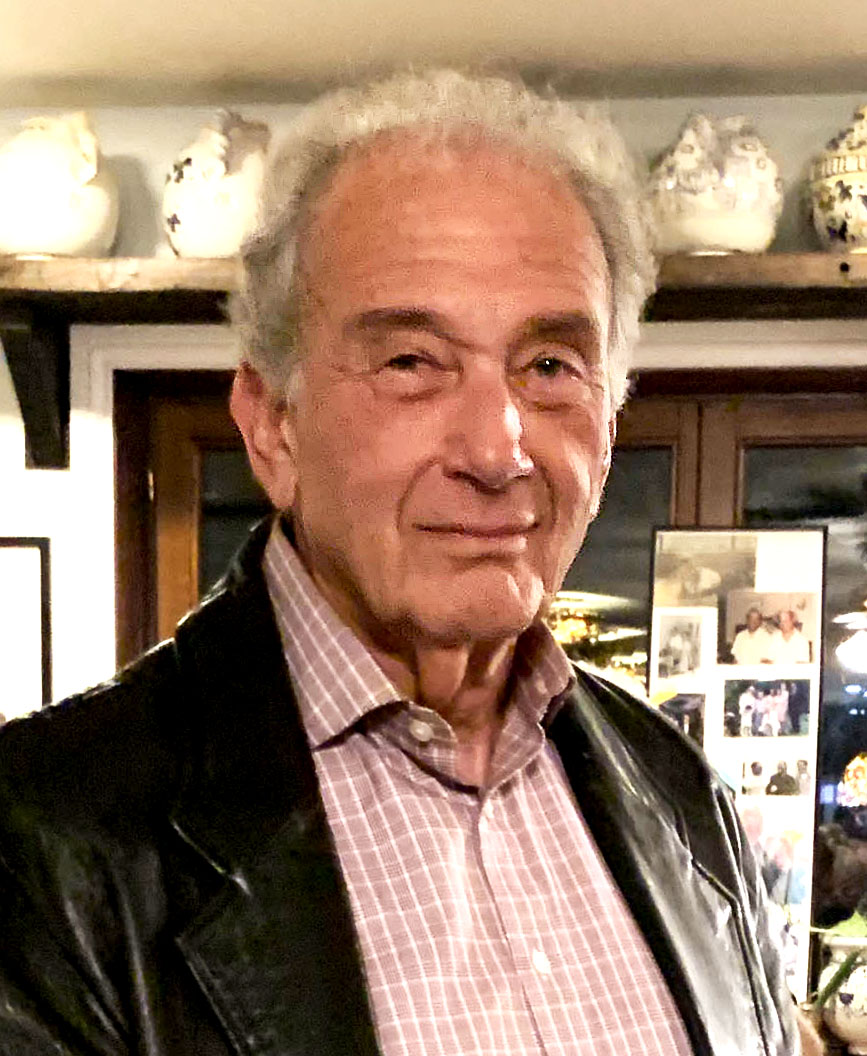
- Born: 1940 (age 85–86); Bronx, New York City, United States
- Education: City College of New York; Case Western Reserve University
- Known for: Ethics in I-O psychology Scientist–practitioner–humanist model Humanistic organizational psychology
- Awards: Abraham J. Briloff Prize in Ethics (2004, 2007); Fellow, American Psychological Association; Fellow, Society for Industrial and Organizational Psychology; Fellow, Association for Psychological Science
- Scientific career
- Fields: Industrial and organizational psychology
- Workplaces: Baruch College, City University of New York

Joel Morris Lefkowitz (born 1940) is an American industrial-organizational (I-O) psychologist and Professor Emeritus of Psychology at Baruch College of the City University of New York (CUNY), known for his work on ethics, values, and professional identity in applied psychology. He has published extensively on topics such as human resources administration, organizational behavior, and ethical practice in I-O psychology. Lefkowitz is widely recognized for integrating humanistic and ethical perspectives into both the scientific and applied dimensions of the field.

== Early life and education ==
Lefkowitz was born in The Bronx, New York. His parents were secular Jews and second-generation immigrants with roots in Poland, Hungary, and the Netherlands. He began college at the Bernard M. Baruch School of the City College of New York at age 16, earning a BBA in psychology at the age of 20. He received a Ph.D. in psychology with a specialization in I-O psychology from Case Western Reserve University in 1965 at 24. While there, he was awarded both an Office of Vocational Rehabilitation Traineeship and a National Science Foundation Fellowship. He was also invited by NASA to apply for its Scientist-Astronaut Program. His dissertation examined the psychological impact of arbitrary job displacement on factory workers’ self-esteem.

== Academic career ==
After completing his doctorate, Lefkowitz returned to his alma mater which in a few years became the Baruch College of the City University of New York (CUNY), as an assistant professor. He remained at Baruch for the duration of his academic career, retiring from full-time teaching in 2009 and becoming professor emeritus. He continues to teach a doctoral-level course on ethical, professional, and legal issues for psychologists as an adjunct professor. His early academic work encompassed human resources practices (such as employee selection and training), with research in job satisfaction, and applications of I-O psychology in police departments.

In the 1970s, his research focused on employment discrimination, and he served as an expert witness in more than 50 legal cases involving alleged discrimination based on ethnicity, gender, or age. He created CUNY’s doctoral program in I-O psychology, which admitted its first cohort in 1982. He directed the program until his retirement.

Lefkowitz also held leadership roles within the American Board of Professional Psychology, including serving on its National Board of Trustees. He was a founding member of the American Board of Industrial & Organizational Psychology. In addition, he consulted extensively in areas such as employment selection, Title VII (Civil Rights Act) compliance, and test validation.

== Later contributions ==
Beginning in the 1990s, Lefkowitz increasingly focused on the role of values in shaping the field of I-O psychology. He critiqued what he viewed as the dominance of short-term economic and corporatist values in the discipline, arguing that these trends were displacing psychology's more humanistic roots. He proposed an expanded model of professional identity: the “scientist-practitioner-humanist model,” in contrast to the traditional scientist-practitioner framework.

He has also contributed to discussions on the applicability of the APA Ethics Code to I-O psychology, including co-authoring recent studies and serving as a panelist at major SIOP conferences. His work has been cited in debates over professional licensing, organizational justice, and corporate social responsibility.

Lefkowitz served as one of the consulting ethicists for The Industrial-Organizational Psychologist (TIP), the newsletter of the Society for Industrial and Organizational Psychology (SIOP), from 2003 to 2005. He has also been a frequent peer reviewer for leading journals, including American Psychologist, Journal of Applied Psychology, Personnel Psychology, Journal of Business Ethics, and Industrial and Organizational Psychology: Perspectives on Science and Practice.

== Honors and recognition ==
In 2004 and again in 2007, Lefkowitz received the Abraham J. Briloff Prize in Ethics from Baruch College, in recognition of his outstanding contributions to ethical discourse in professional psychology. He also earned a diplomate certification in I-O psychology from the American Board of Professional Psychology (ABPP) in 1972. His honors include a National Science Foundation Predoctoral Fellowship, election to the Beta Gamma Sigma Honor Society, and listings in Marquis Who’s Who and 2000 Outstanding Intellectuals of the 20th Century.

Lefkowitz is a Fellow of the Society for Industrial and Organizational Psychology (SIOP), the American Psychological Association (Divisions 14 and 9), and the Association for Psychological Science (APS).

In recognition of his contributions, the SIOP Foundation established the Joel Lefkowitz Early Career Award for Humanistic I-O Psychology, awarded annually.

== Selected publications ==
- Values and Ethics of Industrial-Organizational Psychology (3rd ed., 2023). Taylor & Francis/Routledge.
- “The maturation of a profession: A work psychology for the new millennium.” In I. McWha et al. (Eds.), Humanitarian Work Psychology and the Global Development Agenda (2015). Routledge.
- “Forms of ethical dilemmas in industrial-organizational psychology.” Industrial and Organizational Psychology: Perspectives on Science and Practice, 14(3), 297–319 (2021).
- “Ethical incidents reported by industrial-organizational psychologists: A ten-year follow-up.” Journal of Applied Psychology, 107(10), 1781–1803 (2022, with L. L. Watts).
- “Educating I-O psychologists for science, practice and social responsibility.” Industrial and Organizational Psychology, 7(1), 41–46 (2014).
- “The impact of practice values on our science.” The Industrial-Organizational Psychologist, 50(2), 16–22 (2012).
- “Individual and organizational antecedents of misconduct in organizations.” Journal of Business Ethics, 85(3), 309–332 (2009, with N. Andreoli).
- “To prosper, organizational psychology should expand its values to match the quality of its ethics.” Journal of Organizational Behavior, 29, 439–453 (2008).
- “The values of industrial-organizational psychology: Who are we?” The Industrial-Organizational Psychologist, 43(2), 13–20 (2005).
- “Industrial-organizational psychology and the police.” American Psychologist, 32(5), 346–364 (1977).
