= Index of urban sociology articles =

Urban sociology is the sociological study of social life and human interaction in metropolitan areas. It is a normative discipline of sociology seeking to study the structures, processes, changes and problems of an urban area and by doing so providing inputs for planning and policy making.

== A ==
abandonment — accessibility — Active Living — activity centre — adaptive reuse — Administration for Children and Families — Acid Rain Program(EPA) — achievement gap in the United States — affirmative action — African American — Aid to Families with Dependent Children(AFDC) — air quality(indoor) — Air Pollution Index — air quality index — alienation — amalgamation — annexation — anomie — arcology — arson — asset-based community development — Asian American — Athens Charter — automobile — automobile dependency — autonomy

== B ==
bureaucracy — birth rate — block grant — budget — bus — business cycle — business park

== C ==
capitalism — capital improvement plan — carpool — carsharing — central business district — central place theory — charter school — City Beautiful movement — City of Light Development — city rhythm — civil rights — class stratification — clean air act — communal garden — Communities Directory — community development — community land trust — community of place — Community Reinvestment Act — commuting — complete streets — concentric zone model — conservation easement — Context Sensitive Solutions — context theory — Copenhagenization (bicycling) — core frame model — corporation — cost of living(U.S.) — counter urbanization — crime — criminal justice — cultural bias — culture of poverty -The Coons Effect

== D ==
de facto segregation — de jure segregation — death rate — decentralization — devolution — disability — disinvestment — division of labour

== E ==
economic development — economic growth — elitism — emission standard — employment — empowerment zone — enterprise zone — entertainment center — entrepôt — ethnic enclave

== F ==
Federal Housing Administration — FHA loan — fragmentation

== G ==
gang — gentrification — globalization — government — Great Depression — gridlock — growth management

== H ==
habitability — highway — Hispanic Americans — historic preservation — Home Mortgage Disclosure Act — homelessness — homeowners' association — Housing Act of 1937 — Housing Act of 1949 — Housing and Economic Recovery Act of 2008 — HOPE VI — human ecology — Department of Housing and Urban Development(H.U.D.) — hyperghettoization

== I ==
immigration — inclusionary zoning — income — indoor air pollution in developing nations — industrial ecology — industrialization — inequality — infrastructure — interest group

== K ==
kinship

== L ==
land use — landfill — leapfrogging

== M ==
magnet school — methanol — middle class — migration — modernization — Moving to Opportunity — multiple nuclei model

== N ==
National Ambient Air Quality Standards — neighborhood — Neo-Marxism — nuclear family

== O ==
organized crime — overcrowding

== P ==
parochialism — Personal Responsibility and Work Opportunity Act — Phase I Environmental Site Assessment — polarization — police brutality — pollution — poverty — poverty line — privatization — public transport — psychological stress — public housing — public school — public transport

== R ==
racial discrimination — racial integration — racism — rail system — recycling — regime theory — revenue sharing — rural

== S ==
savings and loan crisis — scholarship — segregation — single parent — smart growth — social complexity — social disorganization theory — social housing — social solidarity — social work — social welfare provision — Socialism — solidarity — Soviet Union — steam engine — streetcar — street children — suburbanization — suburb — Sun Belt

== T ==
taxes — technology — Times Square Red, Times Square Blue —TANF — third world

== U ==
underemployment — underground economy — unemployment — Uniform Crime Report — unionization — urban decay — Urban Mass Transportation Act of 1964 — urban renewal — urban sprawl — urbanization

== V ==
Vice Lords — violence — volunteer — voting bloc

== W ==
Wage — War on Poverty — waste disposal — water supply — welfare — welfare reform — white flight — white collar crime — workfare

== X ==
xenophobia

== Z ==
zoning

== Urban-Related Lists ==
List of United States cities by population

== See also ==
List of U.S. metropolitan areas with large African-American populations

List of air-filtering plants
