= Miguel A. Martínez =

Spanish sociologist

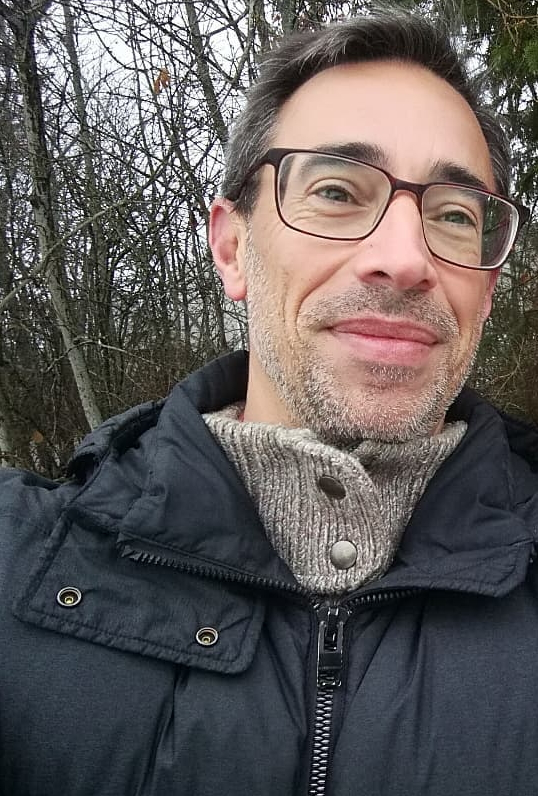
- 2021 in Uppsala

Academic work
- Discipline: Sociology
- Sub-discipline: Urban sociology, Social movements
- Website: https://miguelangelmartinez.net

Miguel A. Martínez (born 1970) is a Spanish and Swedish sociologist at Uppsala University. Martínez is Chair Professor of housing and urban sociology at the IBF (Institute for Housing and Urban Research). In 2020, he published Squatters in the capitalist city. Housing, Justice and Urban Politics.

== Selected publications ==
- Martínez, Miguel A. (Ed.) (2024) Research Handbook on Urban Sociology. Cheltenham: Edward Elgar.
- Martínez, Miguel A. (2020) Squatters in the capitalist city. Housing, Justice and Urban Politics. New York: Routledge.
