= Richard Muth =

American economist (1927–2018)

- Born: May 14, 1927; Chicago, Illinois
- Died: April 10, 2018 (aged 90)

Academic background
- Education: University of Chicago; Washington University in St. Louis
- Doctoral advisor: Arnold Harberger

Academic work
- Discipline: Urban economics
- Institutions: Emory University; Stanford University
- Doctoral students: Cayetano Paderanga Jr.

Richard Ferris Muth (May 14, 1927 – April 10, 2018) was an American economist who is considered to be one of the founders of urban economics (along with William Alonso and Edwin Mills).

Muth obtained his Ph.D. from the University of Chicago in 1958, with a thesis on non-farm housing demand.
