= Transition zone =

Transition zone may refer to:

- Transition zone (Earth), a part of the Earth’s mantle located between the lower mantle and the upper mantle
- Transition zone, the region between the near and far fields of a transmitting antenna
- Transition zone (TZ), a glandular region of the prostate—see Prostate#Zones
- Zone of transition, a zone in urban planning
- Ciliary transition zone, a part of the ciliary apparatus.

== See also ==
- Ecotone, a transition zone between two biomes
