= Chauncy Harris =

American geographer

Multiple nuclei model by Chauncy Harris and Edward Ullman

Chauncy Dennison Harris (1914 – December 26, 2003) was an American geographer and pioneer of modern geography. His seminal works in the field of American urban geography ("The Nature of Cities" and "A Functional Classification of Cities in the United States") along with his work on the Soviet Union during and after the Cold War era established him as one of the world's foremost urban geographers. He also made significant contributions to the geographical study of ethnicity, specifically with respect to non-Russian minorities living within the Soviet Union. Harris traveled regularly to the Soviet Union and played a key role in establishing a healthy dialog between Soviet and American scholars.

== Life and career ==
Harris was born in 1914 in Logan, Utah. The son of Academian Franklin S. Harris, he showed an early interest in Geography, declaring to his family at the end of second grade that he was going to become a geographer. He graduated from Brigham Young High School in Provo in 1930. He received a B.A. from Brigham Young University (BYU) in 1933. The valedictorian of his class, Harris became the first Rhodes Scholar from BYU. The scholarship took him to Oxford where he completed a second B.A. as well as a Master's Degree. He also received an M.A. from the London School of Economics before returning to the U.S. He completed his Ph.D. at the University of Chicago in 1940. His dissertation was entitled, "Salt Lake City – a Regional Capital in 1940."

After brief stints at Indiana University and the University of Nebraska, Harris was appointed assistant professor of geography at the University of Chicago in 1943. Around this same time he was called into military service with the U.S. Department of State, Office of the Geographer. Later, in 1943–44, he served the country in the Office of Strategic Services. In Washington he became intrigued by the mystery surrounding the Soviet Union. He started studying Russian and exploring the available cartographic and statistical information about the country. He published his first two works on the Soviet Union in 1945. His early work in this area left him well prepared in the late 1950s when the Soviet Union began opening up to foreigners. By the time of his first visit, he was already a well established and respected expert in the field. Over the course of his career, he made 14 trips to the Soviet Union.

In addition to his work on the Soviet Union, Harris made several important contributions to the field of American Urban Geography. In particular, in 1945 he wrote "The Nature of Cities" with Edward Ullman. The paper, published in the Annals of the American Academy of Political and Social Science, described the Multiple nuclei model of urban development, which had prophetic relevance for understanding American cities in the later 20th century. This model gives a suggestion as to the possible land use within a city. It is an alternative model to the Concentric zone model and the Sector model.

During his professional career Harris held a number of important and prestigious positions including dean of the Division of the Social Sciences at the University of Chicago (1954–1960). He served on the University of Chicago faculty from 1943 to 1984 and then continued as the Samuel N. Harper Distinguished Service Professor Emeritus in Geography until his death in 2003.

== Awards and honors ==
- President of the Association of American Geographers (1957)
- President of the American Association for the Advancement of Slavic Studies (1962)
- Councilor of the American Geographical Society from 1961 to 1974
- Secretary-general and treasurer of the International Geographical Union (1968–1976)
- Vice President of the American Geographical Society from 1969 to 1974
- Longtime member of the editorial board of the American Geographical Society's Geographical Review
- Was a key player in the founding of the American Geographical Society's Soviet Geography
- Co-editor of Soviet Geography for many years
- In 1985 the American Geographical Society awarded him The Cullum Geographical Medal
- In 1987 the Royal Geographical Society awarded him the Victoria Medal

== See also ==
- Geographers on Film
