= Zone of transition =

Concentric zone model Commuter zone Residential zone Working-class zone Zone of transition Factory zone Central business district

Core frame model

Zone of transition is the area between the factory zone and the working-class zone in the concentric zone model of urban structure devised by Ernest Burgess. The zone of transition is an area of flux where the land use begins to change.

In the core frame model showing the structure of the center of the city, the zone of transition encircles the central business district (CBD). It includes a zone of assimilation where the buildings are being drawn into CBD usage. There may also be a zone of degradation where the buildings are changing from CBD usage to residential land use.

It is characterized by residential deterioration and encroachment by business and light manufacturing.
