= Suburbanization =

Population shift from central urban areas into suburbs

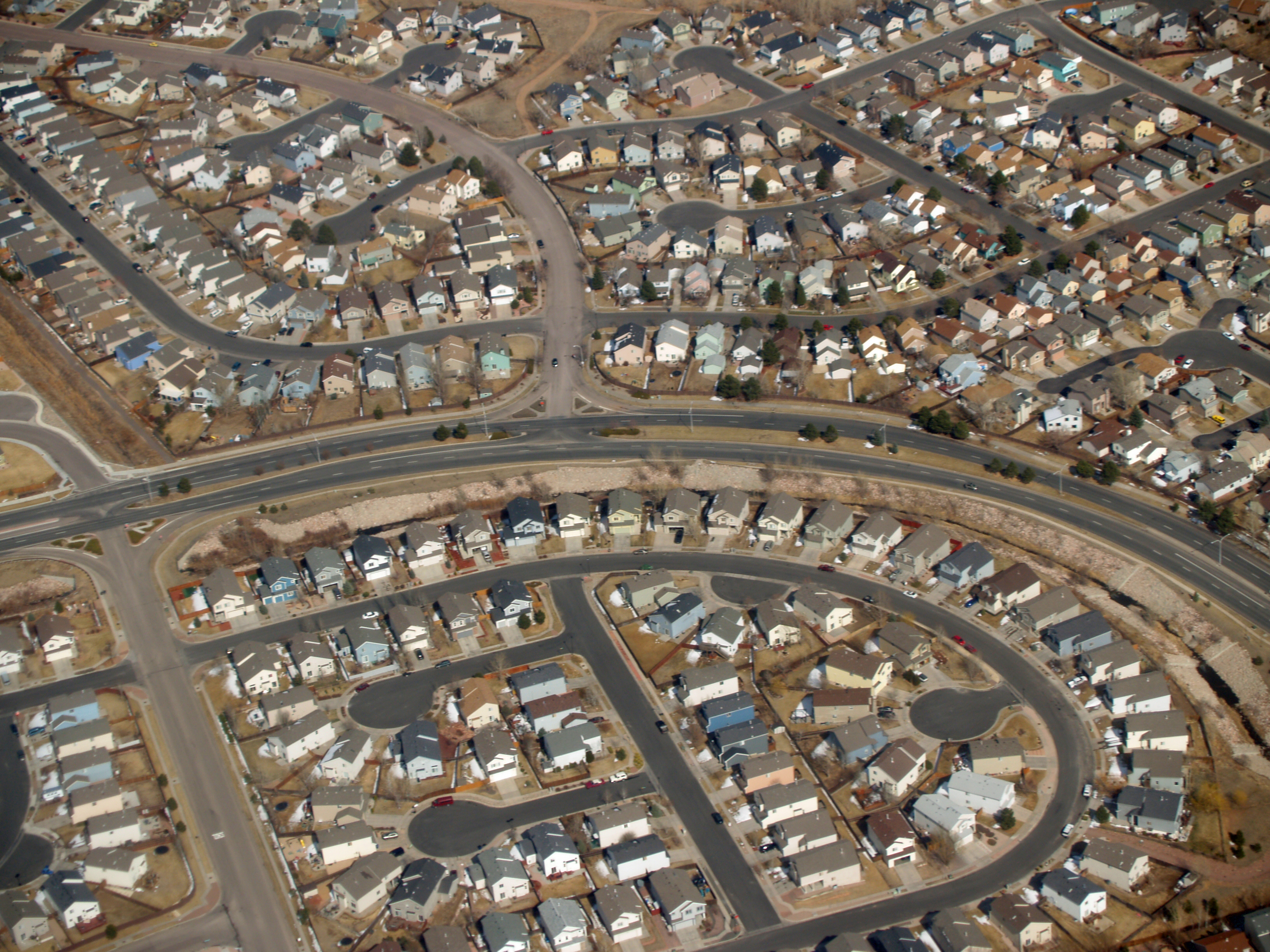
A suburban land use pattern in the United States (Colorado Springs, Colorado), showing a mix of residential streets and cul-de-sacs intersected by a four-lane road.

Suburbanization (American English), also spelled suburbanisation (British English), is a population shift from historic core cities or rural areas into suburbs. Most suburbs are built in a formation of (sub)urban sprawl. As a consequence of the movement of households and businesses away from city centers, low-density, peripheral urban areas grow. Proponents of curbing suburbanization argue that sprawl leads to urban decay and a concentration of lower-income residents in the inner city, in addition to environmental harm.

Suburbanization can be a progressive process in which growing populations, technological innovations, and economic changes drive settlement outward, following the concentric zone model. Suburban growth takes many forms globally including planned satellite towns in Europe, rail-oriented suburbs in East Asia, Canadian high-rises, and the expansion of informal peri-urban areas in the Global South. Patterns of global suburban sprawl have emerged from a combination of demographic trends and economic development and have produced diverse social, economic, and environmental outcomes.

== History ==
=== United States ===
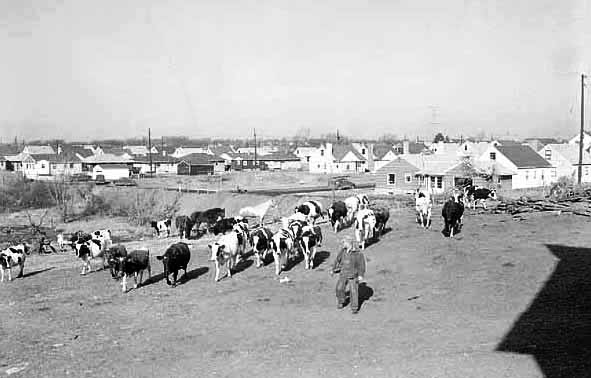
View of a housing development near a farm in Richfield, Minnesota, a suburb of Minneapolis, 1954.

Post–World War II economic expansion in the United States included a sudden boom in housing construction as developers raced to address housing shortages across the country. As veterans returned from war, their GI Bill benefits made it especially easy to buy homes in these new, cost-efficient neighborhoods, populating them quickly with young couples and new families. These new neighborhoods were outside the inner city suburbs. This movement away from the inner city to new outer suburbs spawned new "minicites" which have served as smaller centers of economic activity. Racially discriminatory housing policies in many areas prevented people of color from buying homes in the new suburbs, making them largely white-dominated spaces. The nationwide mass migration of white homeowners into the suburbs became known as "white flight".

Suburbs are often built around certain industries such as restaurants, shopping, and entertainment, which allows suburban residents to travel less and interact more within the suburban area. For example, Kings County, New York served New York City as farmland in the 18th century, with boats carrying produce across the East River. The steam ferry later made Brooklyn Heights a commuter town for Wall Street. Streetcar suburbs spread through the county, and as elevated railways further extended its reach, the City of Brooklyn grew to fill the county. Areas along the river became industrialized and apartment buildings filled the places where factories did not replace the scattered houses. As a result, much of Brooklyn transformed into a suburban economy and later into an urban economy entirely.

The March uptown proceeded similarly on the other side of the East River, and many other suburbs have followed the cycle.

Similarly, the rise of modern delivery logistics in postal services, which takes advantage of computerization and the availability of efficient transportation networks, also eliminates some of the advantages that were once to be had from having a business located in the city. Industrial, warehousing, and factory land uses have also moved to suburban areas. This removes the need for company headquarters to be within a quick courier distance of warehouses and ports. Urban areas often suffer from traffic congestion, which creates extra driver costs for the company that may have otherwise been reduced if they were located in a suburban area near a highway instead. Lower property taxes and low land prices encourage selling industrial land for profitable brownfield redevelopment.

Suburban areas also offer more land to use as a buffer between industrial areas and residential and retail spaces. This may avoid NIMBY sentiments and gentrification pressure from the local community due to residential and retail areas being adjacent to industrial spaces in an urban area. Suburban municipalities can offer tax breaks, specialized zoning, and regulatory incentives to attract industrial land users to their area, such as City of Industry, California. The overall effect of these developments is that both businesses and individuals now see an advantage to relocating to the suburbs, where the cost of buying land, renting space, and running their operations is cheaper than in the city. This continuing dispersal from a single-city center has led to the advent of edge cities and exurbs, which arise out of clusters of office buildings built in suburban commercial areas, shopping malls, and other high-density developments. With more jobs for suburbanites in these areas rather than in the main city core from which the suburbs grew, traffic patterns have become more complex, with the volume of intra-suburban traffic increasing. Historically, by the year 2000, nearly half of the US population had relocated to suburban areas.

In the early 21st century, the spread of communication services, such as broadband, e-mail, and practical home video conferencing, have enabled more people to work from home rather than commuting. Increased connectivity and digitization of office-based work, especially in response to the COVID-19 pandemic, have improved the ability for suburban residents to work from home.

=== Central and Eastern Europe ===
Worldwide and Central and Eastern European cities alike have the reputation of being dangerous or very expensive areas to live, while the suburbs are often viewed as safer and more conducive to raising a family. There have however, also been periods of urbanization.

During the mid to late 20th century, most socialist countries in the Eastern Bloc were characterized by under-urbanization, which meant that industrial growth occurred well in advance of urban growth, which was sustained by rural-urban commuting. City growth, residential mobility, land, and housing development were under tight political control. Consequently, sub-urbanization in post-socialist Europe is not only a recent, but also a particular phenomenon. The creation of housing and land markets, together with state's withdrawal from housing provisions, have led to the development of privatized modes of housing production and consumption, with an increasing role for private actors, and particularly for households. Yet, the regulatory and institutional frameworks indispensable to a market-driven housing system – including housing finance – have remained underdeveloped, particularly in south-eastern Europe. This environment is what has stimulated housing self-provision. Seemingly, different forces have shaped different outcomes.

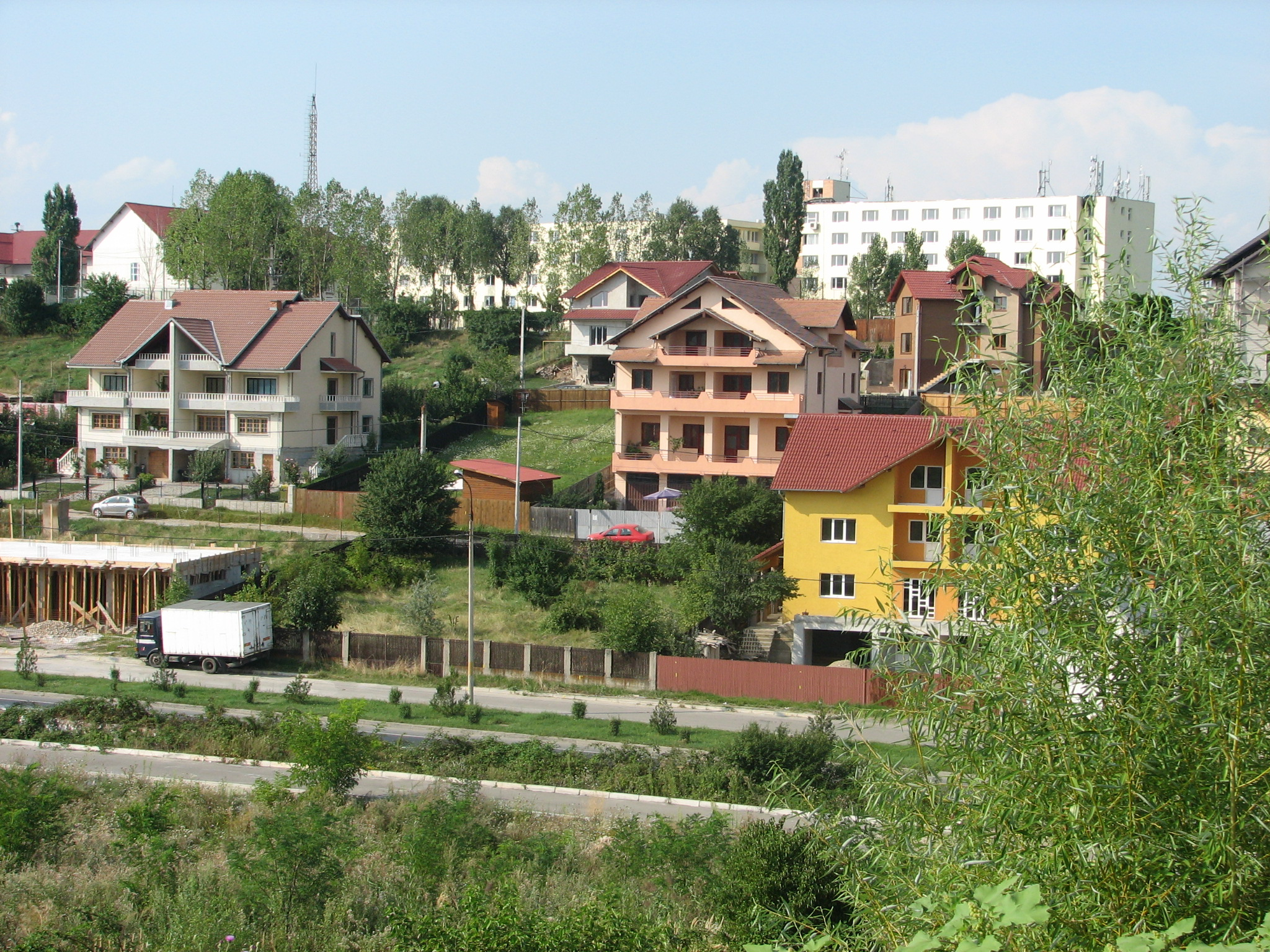
Post-socialist suburbanization in Pitești, Romania.

Long-suppressed urbanization and a dramatic housing backlog resulted in extensive peri-urban growth in Tirana (Albania), which during the 1990s doubled the size of the city whereas war refugees put pressure on cities of former Yugoslavia. Elsewhere processes of suburbanization seemed dominant, but their pace differed according to housing shortages, available finances, preferences, and the degree of 'permitted' informality. The process was slow in Prague during the 1990s and more apparent after 2000, when housing affordability improved. Conversely, Slovenian and Romanian suburban developments visibly surrounded cities/towns during the 1990s. Nonetheless, socialist legacies of underdeveloped infrastructure and the affordability crisis of transition differentiate post-socialist suburbs from their Western counterparts.

Various degrees of informality characterized suburban housing from illegal occupation of public land (Tirana), illegal construction on agricultural private land (Belgrade) to the unauthorized but later legalized developments in Romania. Suburban housing displayed a chaotic/unplanned character, especially in south-eastern Europe, where the state retains a degree of illegitimacy. Accepting scattered for-profit housing, much of the new detached suburban houses seem self-developed. Allegedly, owner-building has become a household strategy to adapt to recession, high and volatile inflation, to cut construction costs, and to bridge access to housing. The predominantly owner-built feature of most suburban housing, with the land often obtained at no cost through restitution policies or illegal occupation, allowed a mix of low-/middle-income households within these developments.

== Causes ==
=== Transportation and infrastructure innovation ===
The development of transportation systems has strongly shaped suburban development. Different forms of transportation have allowed for greater movement into spaces outside of the city center as commutes have become more accessible. While expansion in the United States, Canada, Australia, and regions of the Middle East focused on the use of automobiles, the use of railway systems was adapted in Japan, South Korea, and some European countries.

=== Housing market and land availability ===
In most regions housing affordability and available space are drivers for outward movement of households. Rising costs in high-populated city centers motivate movement to cheaper land on the outskirts. In some places with high average incomes, the want for space and large housing mixes socio-economic classes.

=== Government policy ===
In European and East Asian countries, planned satellite cities, urban growth boundaries, and green belts have shaped compact suburban development, while roadway investments and zoning regulations have made way for more low-density suburban growth in North America. In regions of Africa, South America and South Asia, fragmented governance contributes to a mixture of formal and informal suburban growth.

=== Demographic change and migration ===
Growing worldwide population, household formation, and migration have effect on suburbanization globally. In Europe, Canada, Australia, and the United States trends show an increasing minority and immigrant populations as immigrants have chosen to settle in suburban areas rather than urban centers, which scholars describe as "suburban immigrant gateways." Peri-urban areas in the Global South have similarly taken in rural migrants seeking employment opportunities in urban centers. Increasing international mobility also contributes to these diverse suburb formations and population compositions.

== Suburbanization and race ==
Patterns of suburbanization have intersected with race, ethnicity, and migration. While dynamics and development vary widely across the world, researchers emphasize that suburban areas are shaped by broad cultural inequalities such as racial segregation and social stratification. This effect is not uniform, as there are suburban areas which have become centers for cultural diversity and social mobility, hosting large populations of immigrants.

In Europe, racial and ethnic dynamics in suburban areas are tied to immigration from neighboring countries. Research has documented a pattern of social exclusion across Europe as many ethnic minority and immigrant populations reside in peripheral housing, satellite towns, or suburban districts. These areas have repeatedly become the focal points for debates regarding integration, opportunity, and inequality.

In the United States, the rise of suburbanization is often defined by its intersection with racially exclusive housing practices including redlining, discriminatory lending, and mass movements of white homeowners away from urban centers. However, during the late twentieth century, the racial compositions of suburbs has changed to become increasingly diverse as minority and immigrant households have moved into first and second-ring suburban areas.

In the rapidly expanding regions of the Global South there has emerged a combination between new middle-class residential developments and informal settlements inhabited by marginalized and migrant populations. This geographic mixture reflects economic stratification and uneven infrastructure planning, both identifiers for socio-economic segregation.

== Psychological effects ==
=== Social isolation ===
Historically, it was believed that living in highly urban areas resulted in social isolation, disorganization, and psychological problems, while living in the suburbs was supposed to overall improve happiness, due to lower population density, lower crime, and a more stable population. A study based on data from 1974, however, found this not to be the case, finding that people living in the suburbs had neither greater satisfaction with their neighborhood nor greater satisfaction with the quality of their lives as compared to people living in urban areas. However, this data is outdated.

=== Drug abuse ===
Pre-existing disparities in the demographic composition of suburbs pose problems in drug consumption and abuse. This is due to the disconnection created between drug addiction and the biased outward perception of suburban health and safety. In the United States, the combination of demographic and economic features created as a result of suburbanization has increased the risk of drug abuse in suburban communities. Heroin in suburban communities has increased in incidence as new heroin users in the United States are predominantly white suburban men and women in their early twenties. Adolescents and young adults are at an increased risk of drug abuse in suburban spaces due to the enclosed social and economic enclaves that surburbanization propagates. The New England Study of Suburban Youth found that the upper middle class suburban cohorts displayed an increased drug use when compared to the natural average.

The shift in demographics and economic statuses related to suburbanization has increased the risk of drug abuse in affluent American communities and changed the approach to drug abuse public health initiatives. When addressing public health concerns of drug abuse with patients directly, suburban health care providers and medical practitioners have the advantage of treating a demographic of drug abuse patients that are better educated and equipped with resources to recover from addiction and overdose. The disparity of treatment and initiatives between suburban and urban environments in regard to drug abuse and overdose is a public health concern. Although suburban healthcare providers may have more resources to address drug addiction, abuse, and overdose, preconceived ideas about suburban lifestyles may prevent them from providing proper treatment to patients. Considering the increasing incidence of drug abuse in suburban environments, the contextual factors that affect certain demographics must also be considered to better understand the prevalence of drug abuse in suburbs. For example, adolescents and their relationship with social groups in school and other socializing forces that occur as a result of suburbanization impact drug abuse incidence.

== Economic impacts ==
The economic impacts of suburbanization have become very evident since the trend began in the 1950s. Changes in infrastructure, industry, real estate development costs, fiscal policies, and diversity of cities have been easily apparent, as "making it to the suburbs", mainly in order to own a home and escape the chaos of urban centers, have become the goals of many American citizens. These impacts have many benefits as well as side effects and are becoming increasingly important in the planning and revitalization of modern cities.

=== Impact on urban industry ===
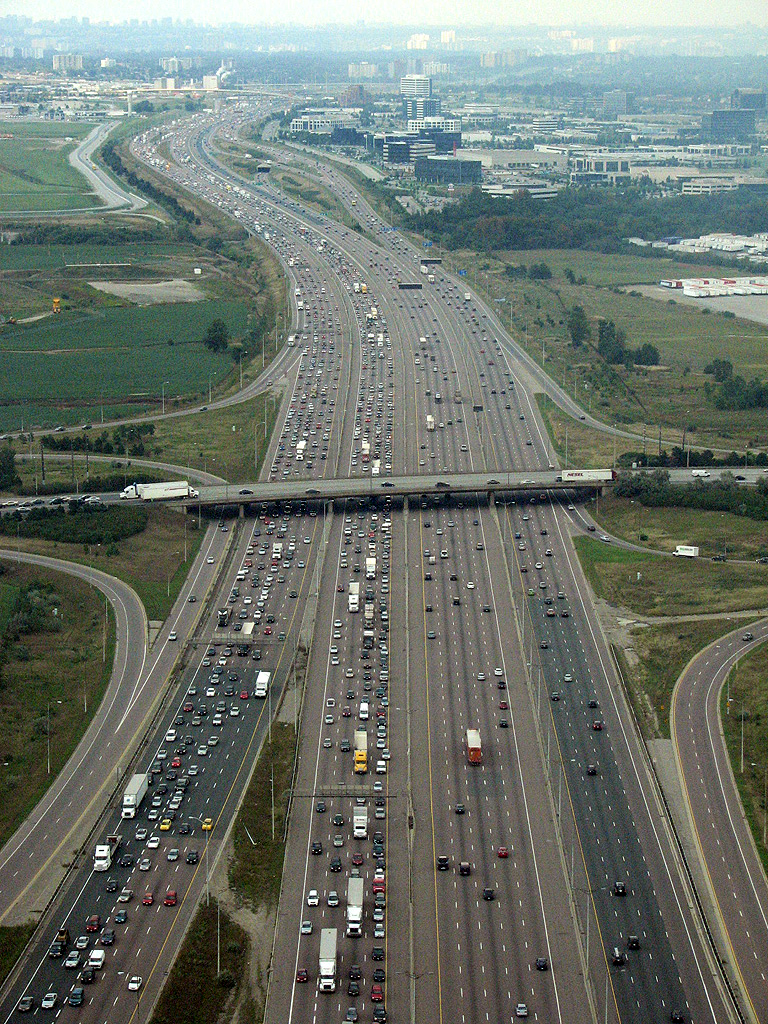
401 highway near Toronto, Canada with a suburban industry area in the background. Note the office buildings are far apart. Many office buildings in suburban industry areas stand on large green campuses, unlike downtown ones with nearby buildings and very little greenery.

The days of industry dominating the urban cores of cities are diminishing as population decentralization of urban centers increases. Companies increasingly look to build industrial parks in less populated areas, largely for more modern buildings and ample parking, as well as to appease the popular desire to work in less congested areas. Government economic policies that provide incentives for companies to build new structures and lack of incentives to build on Brownfield land, also contribute to the flight of industrial development from major cities to surrounding suburban areas. As suburban industrial development becomes increasingly more profitable, it becomes less financially attractive to build in high-density areas. Another impact of industry leaving the city is the reduction of buffer zones separating metropolitan areas, industrial parks and surrounding suburban residential areas. As this land becomes more economically relevant, the value of such properties very often increases, causing many undeveloped landowners to sell their land.

=== Consequences on infrastructure ===
As America continues to sprawl, the cost of the required water lines, sewer lines, and roads could cost more than $21,000 per residential and non-residential development unit, costing the American government $1.12 trillion between 2005 and 2030. Along with the costs of infrastructure, existing infrastructure suffers, as most of the government's money that is dedicated to improving infrastructure goes to paying for the new necessities in areas further out from the urban core. As a result, the government will often forego maintenance on previously built infrastructure.

=== Real estate development costs ===
In the United States, prospective home buyers will often drive farther into the suburbs until they can find an area in which they can afford a home. This concept is colloquially known as "drive until you qualify."

Suburban lots are typically larger than urban lots. Thus, bigger lots often mean fewer lots and suburbanization can lead to less dense real estate development.

=== Fiscal impact ===
Public deficits can often grow as a result of suburbanization, mainly because property taxes tend to be lower in less densely populated areas. Also, because of decentralization, lack of variety of housing types, and greater distances between homes, real estate development and public service costs tend to increase, which in turn increases the deficit of upper levels of government. Suburbanization often resulted in lower tax revenues for cities, leading to a reduction in the quality of public services due to the exodus of wealthier populations.

=== Effect on urban diversity ===
As the trend of suburbanization took hold in the United States, many of the people who left the city for the suburbs were white. As a result, there was a rise in Black home ownership in central cities. As white households left for the suburbs, housing prices in transition neighborhoods fell, which often lowered the cost of home ownership for Black households. This trend was stronger in older and denser cities, especially in the Northeast and Midwest, because new construction was generally more difficult. As of the 2010 census, minorities such as African Americans, Asian Americans and Indo-Americans have become an increasing large factor in recent suburbanization. Many suburbs now have large minority communities in suburban and commuter cities.

=== Environmental impacts ===
The growth of suburbanization and the spread of people living outside the city can cause negative impacts on the environment. Suburbanization has been linked to the increase in vehicle mileage, increased land use, and an increase in residential energy consumption. From these factors of suburbanization, it has then caused a degradation of air quality, increase usage of natural resources like water and oil, as well as increased amounts of greenhouse gas. With the increased use of vehicles to commute to and from the work place this causes increased use of oil and gas as well as an increase in emissions. With the increase in emissions from vehicles, this then can cause air pollution and degrades the air quality of an area. Suburbanization is growing which causes an increase in housing development, that then results in an increase in land consumption and available land. Suburbanization has also been linked to increases in natural resource use like water to meet residents' demands and to maintain suburban lawns. Also, with the increase in technology and consumptions of residents there is an increase in energy consumption by the amount of electricity used by residents.

=== Social impacts ===
Patterns of suburban growth have long been associated with changes in social life, particularly in communities where low-density development and automobile dependence shape daily routines. Researchers have noted that the spatial form of such environments can influence mobility, social interaction, and community participation, often in ways that differ sharply from older urban districts. Accounts of suburban childhood frequently describe limited independent mobility due to the separation of residential areas from schools, shops, and recreational facilities. Sociologists have argued that such environments can reduce children’s opportunities for autonomous movement and exposure to diverse social settings. A widely cited study from the late twentieth century contended that suburban settings may isolate children from a range of social experiences and prolong dependence on the household. Some critics further suggested that adolescents in car-oriented suburbs may experience heightened boredom and frustration, contributing to feelings of alienation, although strong causal evidence remains limited. More recent empirical studies indicate significant variation in suburban youth experiences. Research on fringe suburban communities found that adolescents without access to a vehicle frequently reported restricted opportunities for after-school socialization, which they described as isolating. In contrast, other studies have shown that children in some suburban neighborhoods engage in high levels of outdoor play and contribute to local social cohesion, particularly where low-traffic street designs and accessible green spaces are present. Older adults face distinct challenges in suburban environments. Driving cessation in later life has been associated with sharply increased odds of social isolation, owing to the scarcity of alternative transportation options in many suburbs. Qualitative studies of seniors living in suburban settings have found that limited walkability, inadequate transit, and the absence of proximate communal spaces constrain daily activities and weaken residents’ sense of connection to their community. Additional research highlights the importance of accessible green spaces and neighborhood amenities in mitigating loneliness among older suburban residents. Broader analyses of suburbanization have emphasized how residential sorting, single-use zoning, and the spatial separation of homes, workplaces, and civic institutions can fragment social networks and reduce contact across demographic groups. Early studies described these processes as producing “residential isolation” and weakening traditional community structures. Contemporary research similarly reports that long commute times, rapid suburban expansion, and limited access to shared public spaces may inhibit the development of strong neighborhood ties, though outcomes vary widely among suburbs depending on urban design, density, and local investment in social infrastructure.

== See also ==
- Urbanization
- Counterurbanization
- Transport divide
