= The City (Park and Burgess book) =

Book by Robert E. Park and Ernest W. Burgess

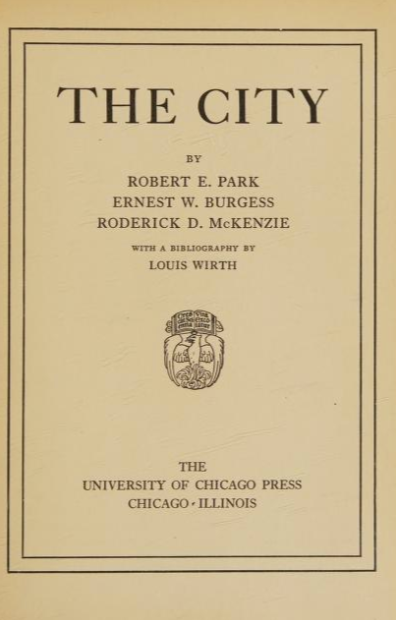
- Title page for The City (1925)
- Author: Robert E. Park, Ernest W. Burgess
- Language: English
- Genre: Non-fiction
- Publication date: 1925
- Publication place: United States

The City is a book by American urban sociologists Robert E. Park and Ernest W. Burgess published in 1925.

== Significance ==
The publication of this work was preceded by an article published by Park in 1915; a modified version of this work appears as Chapter 1 in The City, edited by Park and Burgess (1925). The article - considered to be the primer for the Chicago School of Sociology - is one of the most important urban models in the 20th century.

The theory behind the book is an effect of long research focused on the city of Chicago. Park’s and Burgess’ urbanecology proposes that cities are environments like those found in nature, governed by numerous forces, with competition as the primary force. According to Park and Burgess scarce urban resources lead to competition between groups and eventually to division of urban spaces into distinctive ecological niches which are inhabited by people with similar characteristic due to parallel social pressures they experience. Competition for land and urban resources led to spatial differentiation of urban space into zones.

Based on these assumptions, Park and Burgess created one of the earliest city models – Concentric ring theory first introduced in The City. Chicago and New York were typical examples of this modernist model. The urban core of the city stood for a place to work and live. It was also a space in which different people interacted with each other and, in fact, formed one organism. The school was interested in reforming city life and city value. By careful examination of urban form and the processes that took place in this form, Chicago sociologists determined biotic and cultural dependencies among people. This gave foundations to claim a model of the city that represents concentric zones diversified according to life conditions and social status. All the zones, nevertheless, existed around one collective nuclei- that is the city center, where paths of the city dwellers crossed. This model was later used by Park, Burgess and their students to explain social problems such as crime and unemployment in certain areas of Chicago.

The major assumptions of the book, to quote Michael Dear, are:

- a modernist view of the city as a unified whole, i.e., a coherent regional system in which the center organizes its hinterland;
- an individual-centered understanding of the urban condition; urban process in The City is typically grounded in the individual subjectivities of urbanites, their personal choices ultimately explaining the overall urban condition, including spatial structure, crime, poverty, and racism;
- a linear evolutionist paradigm, in which processes lead from tradition to modernity, from primitive to advanced, from community to society;

== Criticism ==
According to Jerzy Szacki, Chicago School came to an end in the mid 1930s due to the economic turbulences of that time. Chicago School sociologists researched “natural history” of the city of the perfect competition market period, which came to an end along with the Great Depression causing the Chicago School model to become out of date. In the 1980s sociologists, geographers, urban planners based in Southern California have started to write about a different design of city development- the one that was ongoing in the Los Angeles metropolitan area and was also reflective of what was happening throughout the United States.

== See also ==
- Chicago school (sociology)
- Concentric zone model
- Robert E. Park
- Los Angeles School
- Urban Ecology
