= Inner city =

American euphemism for low-income, majority-minority city neighborhoods

The term inner city has been used, especially in the United States, as a euphemism for majority-minority lower-income residential districts that often refer to disinvested neighborhoods, in a downtown or city centre area. Sociologists sometimes turn the euphemism into a formal designation by applying the term inner city to such residential areas, rather than to more geographically central commercial districts, often referred to by terms such as downtown, city centre, or central business district.

== History ==
The term inner city first achieved consistent usage through the writings of white liberal Protestants in the U.S. after World War II, contrasting with the growing affluent suburbs. According to urban historian Bench Ansfield, the term signified both a bounded geographic construct and a set of cultural pathologies inscribed onto urban Black communities. Inner city originated as a term of containment. Its genesis was the product of an era when a largely white suburban mainline Protestantism was negotiating its relationship to American cities. Liberal Protestants' missionary brand of urban renewal refocused attention away from the blight and structural obsolescence thought to be responsible for urban decay, and instead brought into focus the cultural pathologies they mapped onto Black neighborhoods. The term inner city arose in this racial liberal context, providing a rhetorical and ideological tool for articulating the role of the church in the nationwide project of urban renewal. Thus, even as it arose in contexts aiming to entice mainline Protestantism back into the cities it had fled, the term accrued its meaning by generating symbolic and geographic distance between white liberal churches and the Black communities they sought to help.

== Urban renewal ==
Urban renewal (also called urban regeneration in the United Kingdom and urban redevelopment in the United States) is a program of land redevelopment often used to address urban decay in cities. Urban renewal is the clearing out of blighted areas in inner cities to create opportunities for higher class housing, businesses, and more.

In Canada in the 1970s the government introduced Neighbourhood Improvement Programs to deal with urban decay, especially in inner cities. Also, some inner-city areas in various places have undergone the socioeconomic process of gentrification, especially since the 1990s.

== See also ==
- Bid rent theory
- Black flight and white flight
- Concentric zone model
- Ghetto
  - American ghettos
- Industrial deconcentration
- Inner-City Games
- Skid row
- Slum
- Suburban colonization
- Urban sprawl
- Urban structure
- The projects
