= Inner suburb =

Suburbs central to a metropolis

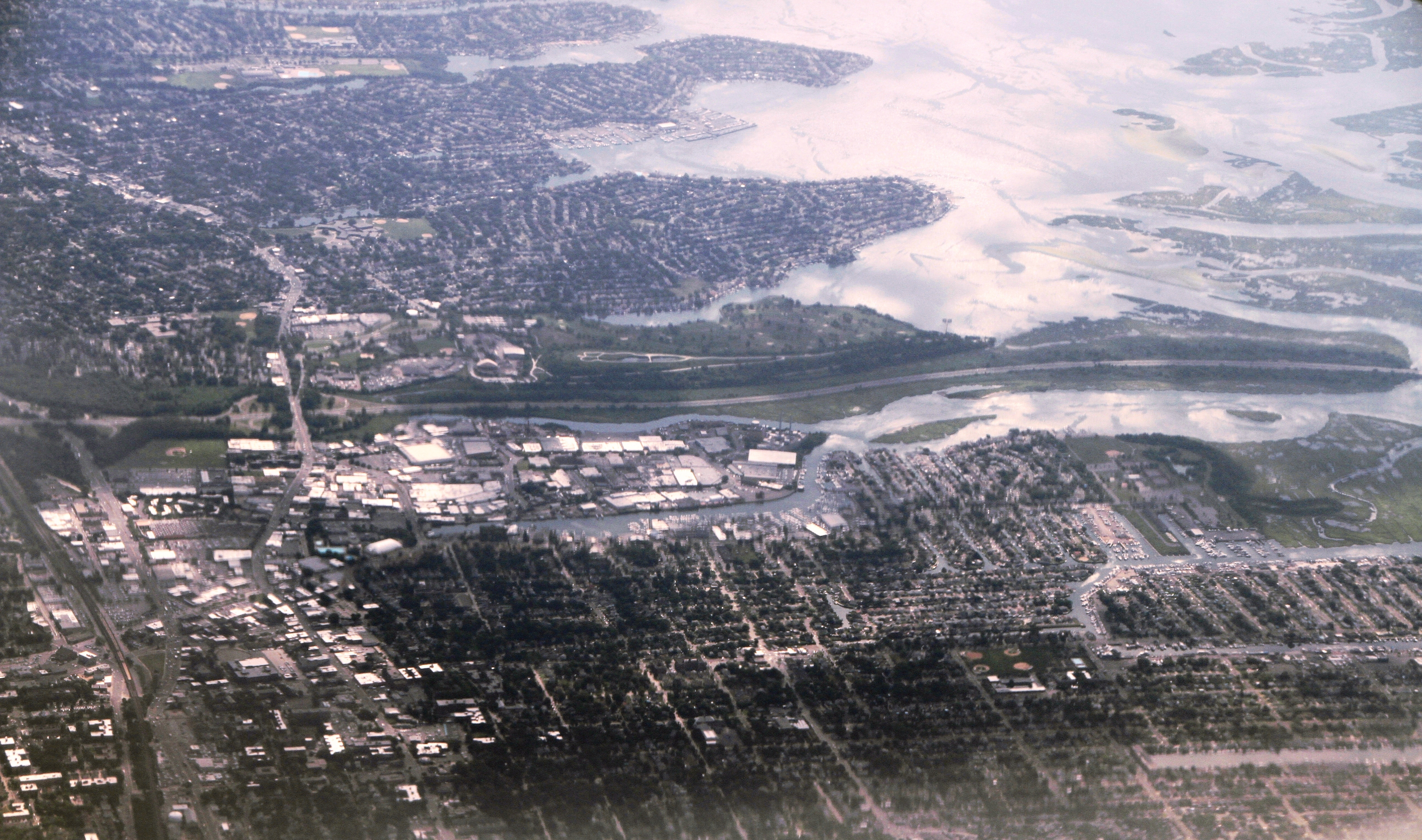
Nassau County, Long Island is emblematic of continuous sprawl in an inner suburb of New York City, United States.

Inner suburbs (also inner ring suburbs) are the suburban communities which lie closest to the urban centre of a major city. They typically have relatively high urban density and are often the oldest communities outside the city proper. Compared to outer-suburban and exurban areas, they are more integrated with the metropolitan centre; in some cities such as Toronto, they may fall under the same municipality.

== Commonwealth of Nations ==
In the Commonwealth countries (especially Australia and New Zealand), inner suburbs are the part of the urban area that constitutes the zone of transition, which lies outside the central business district, as well as the (traditional) working class zone. The inner suburbs of large cities are the oldest and often the most dense residential areas of the city. They tend to feature a high level of mixed-use development. Traditionally, suburbs have been home to the working class, but as manufacturing jobs have migrated to the periphery of cities, many inner suburbs have become gentrified.

== United States ==
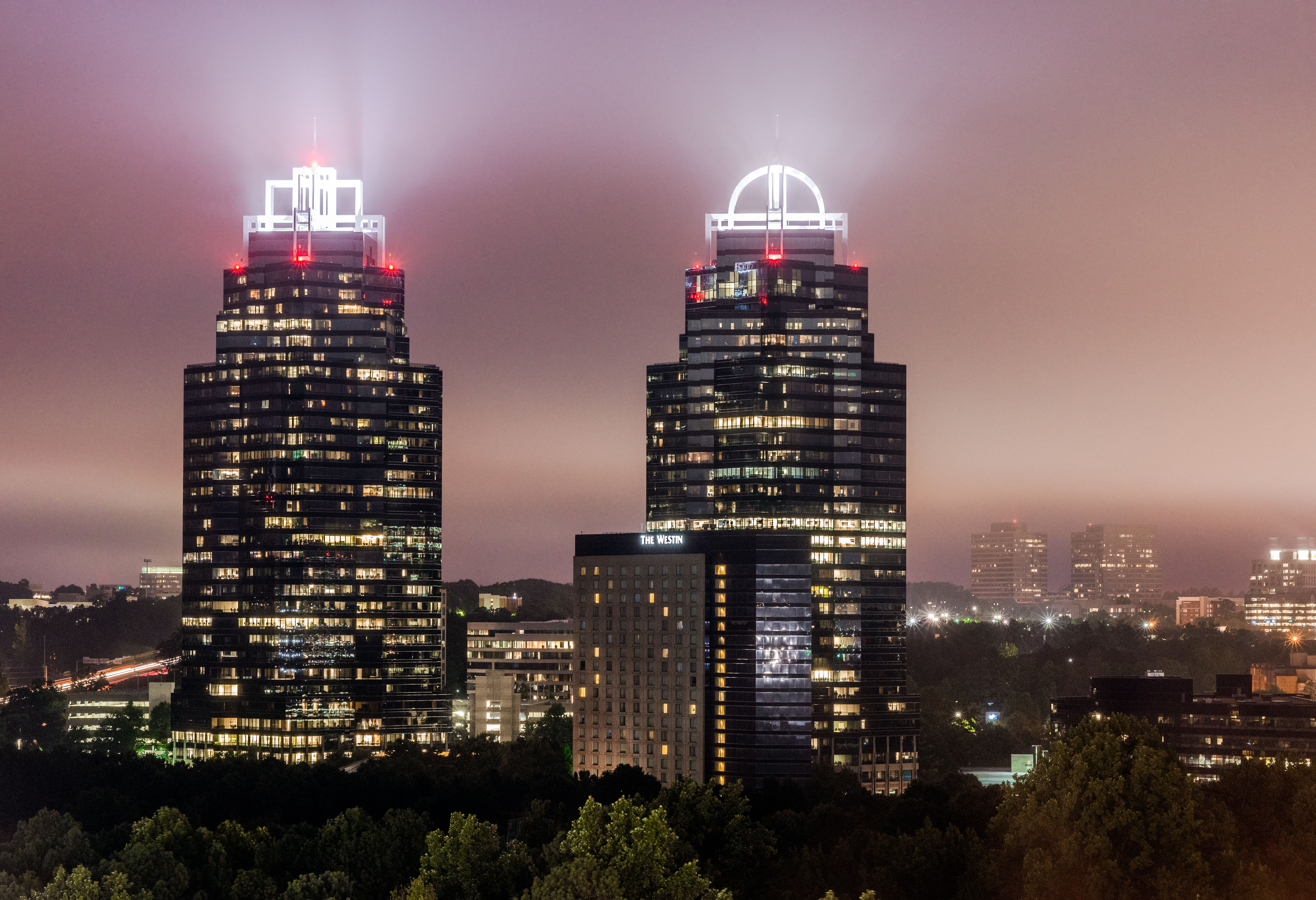
Sandy Springs, Georgia, an inner-ring suburb of Atlanta

In the United States, inner suburbs (sometimes known as "first-ring" suburbs) are the older, more populous communities of a metropolitan area that experienced urban sprawl before the post–World War II baby boom, thus significantly predating those of their outer suburban or exurban counterparts.

In Once the American Dream: Inner-Ring Suburbs of the Metropolitan United States, Professor Bernadette Hanlon defines inner-ring suburbs as "contiguous suburbs adjacent to one another and to the central city, where more than half the housing stock was built prior to 1969".

== See also ==
- Streetcar suburb
