= Industrial deconcentration =

Industrial areas becoming less concentrated

Industrial deconcentration is the movement of industrial zones (factories) away from the center of the city, and further away from each other. It is similar to suburbanization, a residential trend in which a large portion of the population moves away from the metropolis as the inner city becomes overcrowded.

Industrial deconcentration occurs when a previously established industrial district becomes unable to provide efficiently for its own populace due to overcrowding. In a market economy the massive competition and overcrowding of the metropolitan area forces people and businesses to move out to less-industrial areas with less traffic congestion. Modernization in the social, economic, and technological fields of a country is a factor in accelerating industrial deconcentration.

This phenomenon is more apparent in nations that have been industrialized for a longer time. Most countries experiencing industrial deconcentration at the beginning of the 21st century are the states that began industrializing after the end of World War II. In the United Kingdom, industrial deconcentration in manufacturing has been taking place since the 1980s.

Industrial deconcentration is a conscious goal in a comprehensive decentralization policy: to deconcentrate population without excessive commuting, jobs need to be created outside the cities.

An example occurred in Wrocław, Poland following the end of Communist government and planning.

== See also ==
- Rust Belt
