= Tommaso Vitale =

Italian sociologist and academic

- Citizenship: Italy
- Education: University of Milan
- Occupations: Sociologist and academic
- Employer: Sciences Po
- Known for: Comparative urban sociology and public policy research on territorial inequalities and urban governance
- Title: Dean of the Sciences Po Urban School

Tommaso Vitale is an Italian sociologist and academic who is a full professor of sociology at Sciences Po in Paris. He serves as dean of the Sciences Po Urban School. He is affiliated with the Centre for European Studies and Comparative Politics and is scientific director of the cross cutting program Cities Are Back in Town.

His research in comparative urban sociology and public policy examines territorial inequalities, governance of public space, local welfare, housing and institutional change, racism, structural obstacles affecting Roma mobility, and urban desegregation.

== Early life and education ==
Tommaso Vitale was born in Italy. From an early age, he was interested in becoming a scientist and a later turn toward questions of space, borders, and justice during the wars in the former Yugoslavia, when he was involved in solidarity initiatives for refugees. He studied political science and sociology at the University of Milan, earned a master's degree in political science in 1999 and a doctorate in sociology in 2003. Later, he completed postdoctoral research at the École des hautes études en sciences sociales and at Indiana University Bloomington.

== Career ==
Vitale's first academic post was at the University of Milan Bicocca. In 2010, he joined Sciences Po as an associate professor of sociology at the Centre for European Studies and Comparative Politics and became scientific director of the master's program Governing the Large Metropolis. He is also a scientific director of the permanent research seminar Cities Are Back in Town. In May 2022, Sciences Po appointed him as dean of the Urban School.

== Research ==
His research focuses on urban sociology, territorial inequalities, housing and institutional change, local welfare, ethnic minorities in urban and peri urban areas, and the role of associations and volunteer groups in marginal territories. He also contributes to analysis for the CNCDH annual reporting on racism, antisemitism, and xenophobia, including analysis of barometer data. A strand of his scholarship concerns migration, racialisation, and the effects of public action on marginalised groups in European cities. An OpenEdition notice describes L'Etat et la pauvreté étrangère en Europe occidentale, which he co-edited, as drawing on long term ethnographic investigations into the life trajectories of precarious Roma migrants in Spain, France, and Italy.

== Writing ==
Vitale's publications include edited collections and co authored monographs on civic participation, mobilisation, and urban governance. His edited volume In nome di chi? Partecipazione e rappresentanza nelle mobilitazioni locali addresses tensions between participation and political representation through multiple urban case studies. Italia civile: associazionismo, partecipazione e politica, co authored with Roberto Biorcio and published by Donzelli in 2016, examines associative participation in Italy from the period following Tangentopoli onward with attention to civic networks and political change. In June 2024, Fondazione Giangiacomo Feltrinelli published City Divide: Fighting Urban Inequalities, edited by Vitale, and presented it as a comparative examination of mechanisms that generate and perpetuate disparities in urban contexts.

His last book, La prospettiva civica (2024), presents the main findings of a large-scale comparative study on civic activism and associational life in four major Italian cities—Milan, Florence, Rome, and Naples—addressing a core question of urban sociology: how do activists, through their everyday engagement within associations, contribute to the production, reproduction, and transformation of urban inequalities? Across cities, associative engagement emerges as a key site for practices of decommodification, where access to services, sociality, and recognition is partially removed from market logics. Proximity and relational density within neighborhoods play a crucial role in enabling inclusive practices and experimental forms of democracy, even in contexts of structural inequality and institutional fragmentation.

He has edited many issues in journals such as Partecipazione e conflitto, Géocarrefour, Sociologia del lavoro, and Quaderni. His peer-reviewed articles appear in journals including the Journal of Urban Affairs, Journal of Ethnic and Migration Studies, Habitat International, Transnational Corporations Review, Social Movements Studies, Sociologie, and Journal of European Public Policy. Sciences Po's announcement of his deanship also associates him with the founding of the Italian sociology journal Partecipazione e Conflitto.
