= Homer Hoyt =

American economist

- Born: June 14, 1895; Saint Joseph, Missouri, US
- Died: November 29, 1984 (aged 89); Silver Spring, Maryland, US
- Occupation: Economist
- Known for: Redlining; Sector model; Segregated Housing; Shopping Malls
- Title: Chief Land Economist for the Federal Housing Administration

Academic background
- Education: University of Kansas (AB, AM); University of Chicago (JD, PhD)
- Thesis: 1933 (One hundred years of land values in Chicago: The relationship of the growth of Chicago to the rise of its land values, 1830-1933)
- Doctoral advisor: Ernest Fisher

Academic work
- Discipline: Real estate economics

Homer Hoyt (June 14, 1895 – November 29, 1984) was an American economist known for his pioneering work in land use planning, zoning, and real estate economics. He conducted notable research on land economics and developed an influential approach to the analysis of neighborhoods and housing markets. His sector model of land use was influential in urban planning for several decades. His legacy is controversial today, due to his prominent role in the development and justification of racially segregated housing policy and redlining in American cities.

== Biography ==
=== Education ===
Hoyt was born in Saint Joseph, Missouri and attended the University of Kansas, graduating Phi Beta Kappa aged 18, with both an A.B. and an A.M. He went on to earn a J.D. in 1918 and a Ph.D. in economics in 1933, both from the University of Chicago.

=== Career ===
Hoyt is notable for his numerous professional roles in academia, government, and the private sector. In 1917, he briefly became an economics instructor at Beloit College in Wisconsin before joining the War Trade Board as an economist. Hoyt went on to serve on the faculty of the University of Delaware (1918–1920), University of North Carolina at Chapel Hill (1921–1923), and University of Missouri (1924–1925), in addition to a brief stint as a statistician at AT&T (1920–1921). From 1925 to 1934, he worked as a consultant and real estate broker in Chicago while earning his Ph.D.

Between 1934 and 1940, Hoyt served as the Chief Land Economist for the Federal Housing Administration (FHA), his most notable public service position. The newly-formed FHA hired Hoyt to develop "the first underwriting criteria — who is a good credit risk and who is not." At the FHA, Hoyt pioneered the use of maps for business decision making and public policy analysis. Hoyt adapted his dissertation work to understand the spatial distribution of property values and mortgage risks. Supported by Hoyt's research and recommendations, the FHA developed the policy of redlining, the refusal to loan money or allowing minorities to purchase homes in white neighborhoods and the inclusion of racial covenants in property deeds. In a 1939 FHA report, Hoyt argued that segregation was an obvious necessity and that racially-mixed neighborhoods result in decreased land values. Hoyt also published a list of racial groups and ranked them from positive to negative influence on property values: "1. English, Scotch, Irish, Scandinavians, 2. North Italians, 3. Bohemians or Czechs, 4. Poles, 5. Lithuanians, 6. Greeks, 7. Russians, Jews (lower class), 8. South Italians, 9. Negroes, 10. Mexicans." The FHA subsequently justified the practice of redlining to the public by claiming that a purchase of a home by a black person in a white neighborhood would cause the value of the white-owned properties to decline, making their owners more likely to default on their mortgages.

After leaving the FHA, Hoyt went on to work as Director of Research for the Chicago Plan Commission (1941–1943) and Director of Economic Studies for the New York Regional Plan Association (1943–1946). He also taught as a visiting professor at MIT and Columbia University. In 1946, he founded Hoyt Associates, a prominent land use and real estate consulting firm with a specialization in site selection for shopping malls. In 1967, Hoyt established the Homer Hoyt Institute, a nonprofit research and education foundation with a mission to improve the quality of public and private real estate decisions.

== Research ==
Hoyt's 1933 doctoral dissertation, "One hundred years of land values in Chicago: The relationship of the growth of Chicago to the rise of its land values, 1830-1933," is among the most cited dissertations of all time and is still cited regularly today.

Hoyt made a number of theoretical contributions to land economics and urban planning. First, he developed a novel approach to the historical analysis of land values that utilized primary data and mapping techniques, termed "overlay mapping." The approach correlated racial characteristics of a population with land value, so that when mortgage lenders used his data to assess the risk a neighborhood posed for loans, they often refused loans in neighborhoods with predominantly non-white populations, a practice known as redlining. Hoyt's work developed into the sector model, which replaced Ernest Burgess' concentric zone theory as the dominant theory of urban morphology, until it was itself supplanted by the multiple nuclei model. Additionally, Hoyt refined the method of economic base analysis, which enabled municipal and state governments to assess potential population growth based on the mix of basic and non-basic employment within their economies.

Hoyt was also an active contributor to the field of real estate appraisal. With co-author Arthur M. Weimer, Hoyt wrote the successful text book Principles of Real Estate, which was published in seven editions.

== The Homer Hoyt Institute ==
In his later years, Hoyt sought to bridge the gap between academic economists and the real estate industry. Towards this end, Hoyt underwrote the formation of the Homer Hoyt Institute in 1967. The Institute remains active and prominent in the fields of land economics and real estate studies today. Notable initiatives of the Institute include the Hoyt Academic Fellowship, the Maury Seldin Advanced Studies Institute, the Weimer School, and the Weimer School Fellowship. Weimer School Fellows include many prominent academics in the field of real estate economics.

== Selected publications ==
- According to Hoyt; Fifty Years of Homer Hoyt / Articles on law, real estate cycle, economic base, sector theory, shopping centers, urban growth, 1916–1966. [Washington, D.C., 1966]
- Autobiography of Homer Hoyt; Michael Hoyt and Jean Hoyt. No city: photocopy, 2005. Available at Avery Library, Columbia University.
- "More Than Sector Theory: Homer Hoyt's Contributions to Planning Knowledge," Journal of Planning History 6, 3 (2007):248-271 by Robert Beauregard.
- The Structure and Growth of Residential Areas in American Cities; Homer Hoyt. Washington DC: Federal Housing Administration, 1939.
- One Hundred Years of Land Values in Chicago; Homer Hoyt. New York : Arno Press, 1970, [c1933]

== See also ==
- Federal Housing Administration
- Redlining
- Sector model
