= City rhythm =

Metaphor for the regular coming and going in cities

City rhythm is a metaphor for the regular coming and going in cities, the repetitive activities, the sounds and smells that occur regularly in cities. The recognition of city rhythms is a useful metaphor, helping to understand modern city life. The concept of city rhythm makes it possible to understand the multitude of aspects of city life. Traditional approaches to urban thinking focus on one such rhythm only, normally the dominant one. This leads to the omission of many aspects of city life.

Dominant rhythm is a metaphor used in conjunction with city rhythm. It is the most powerful rhythm in a city, enabling the shaping and forming of time and space, both within the city and in faraway places through networks.

These dominant rhythms are not fixed and indeed change. Religious rhythms are more dominant in the past, whereas at present economic rhythms prevail.
