= Multiple nuclei model =

Multi nuclei model of city

Multiple nuclei model

The multiple nuclei model is an economic model created by Chauncy Harris and Edward Ullman in the 1945 article "The Nature of Cities".

== The model ==
The model describes the layout of a city, based on Chicago. It says that even though a city may have begun with a central business district, or CBD, other smaller CBDs develop on the outskirts of the city near the more valuable housing areas to allow shorter commutes from the outskirts of the city. This creates nodes or nuclei in other parts of the city besides the CBD thus the name multiple nuclei model. Their aim was to produce a more realistic, if more complicated, model. Their main goals in this were to:

1. Move away from the concentric zone model
2. Better reflect the complex nature of urban areas, especially those of larger size

The model assumes that:

1. Land is not flat in all areas
2. There is even Distribution of Resources
3. There is even Distribution of people in Residential areas
4. There is even Transportation Costs

== Reasons for the model ==
Harris and Ullman argued that cities do not grow around a single nucleus, but rather several separate nuclei. Each nucleus acts like a growth point.

The theory was formed based on the idea that people have greater movement due to increased car ownership. This increase of movement allows for the specialization of regional centers (e.g. heavy industry, business parks, retail areas). The model is suitable for large, expanding cities. The number of nuclei around which the city expands depends upon situational as well as historical factors. Multiple nuclei develop because:

1. Certain industrial activities require transportation facilities e.g. ports, railway stations, etc. to lower transportation costs.
2. Various combinations of activities tend to be kept apart e.g. residential areas and airports, factories and parks, etc.
3. Other activities are found together for their mutual advantage e.g. universities, bookstores and coffee shops, etc.
4. Some facilities need to be set in specific areas in a city - for example, the CBD requires convenient traffic systems, and many factories need an abundant source of resources.

== Effects of multiple nuclei on Industry ==
As the multiple nuclei develop, transportation hubs such as airports are constructed which allow industries to be established with reduced transportation costs. These transportation hubs have negative externality such as noise pollution and lower land values, making land around the hub cheaper. Hotels are also constructed near airports because people who travel tend to want to stay near the source of travel. Housing develops in wedges and gets more expensive the farther it is from the CBD.

== See also ==
- Sector model
- Urban structure
- Concentric zone model
