= Urban sociology =

Sociological study of life and human interaction in metropolitan areas

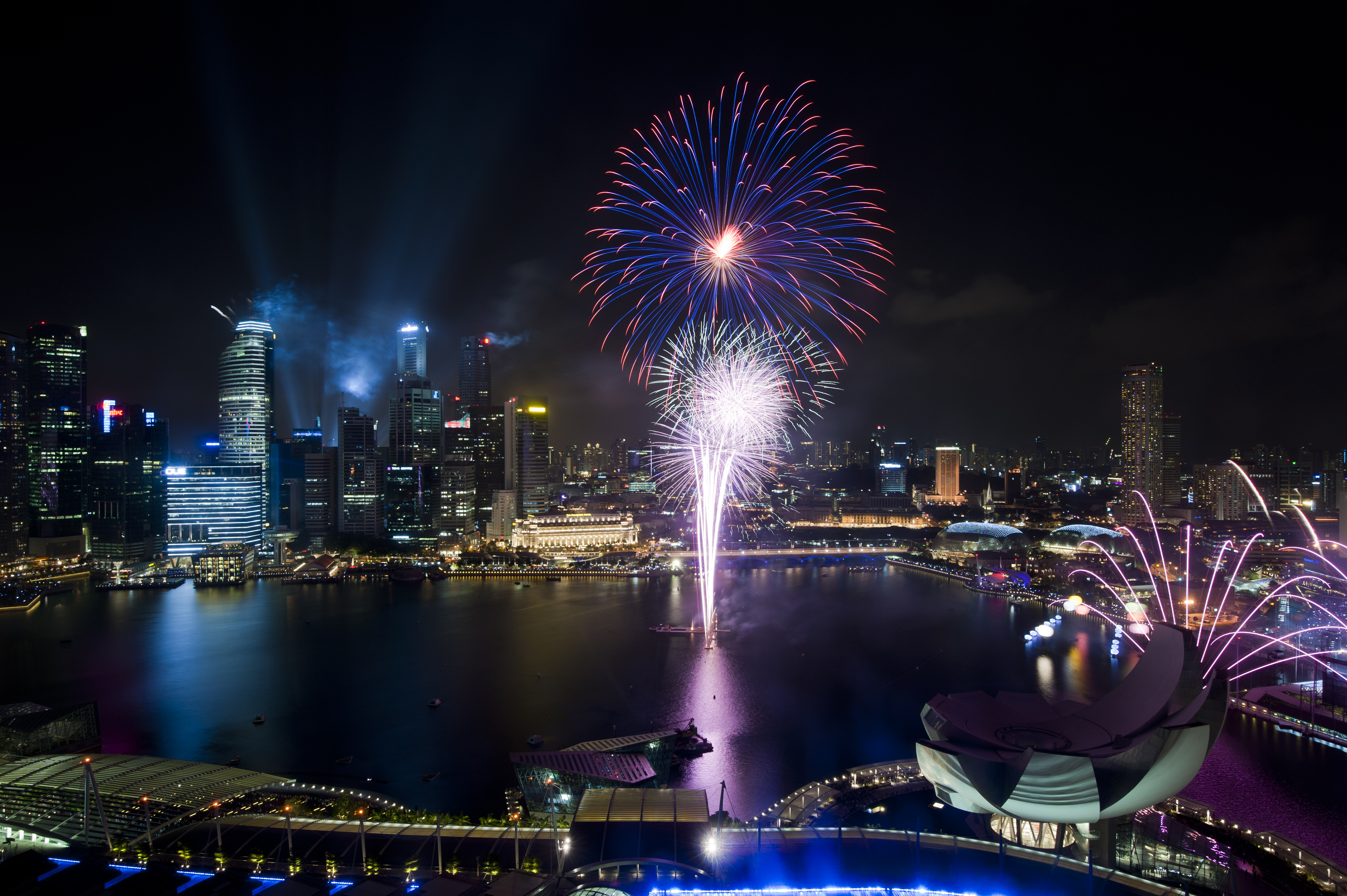
Singapore National Day Parade 2011 fireworks preview marina bay sands floating platform

Urban sociology is the sociological study of cities and urban life. One of the field's oldest sub-disciplines, urban sociology studies and examines the social, historical, political, cultural, economic, and environmental forces that have shaped urban environments. Like most areas of sociology, urban sociologists use statistical analysis, observation, archival research, census data, social theory, interviews, and other methods to study a range of topics, including poverty, racial residential segregation, economic development, migration and demographic trends, gentrification, homelessness, blight and crime, urban decline, and neighborhood changes and revitalization. Urban sociological analysis provides critical insights that shape and guide urban planning and policy-making.

The philosophical foundations of modern urban sociology originate from the work of sociologists such as Karl Marx, Ferdinand Tönnies, Émile Durkheim, Max Weber and Georg Simmel who studied and theorized the economic, social and cultural processes of urbanization and its effects on social alienation, class formation, and the production or destruction of collective and individual identities.

These theoretical foundations were further expanded and analyzed by a group of sociologists and researchers at the University of Chicago in the early twentieth century. In what became known as the Chicago School of sociology the work of Robert Park, Louis Wirth and Ernest Burgess on the inner city of Chicago revolutionized not only the purpose of urban research in sociology but also the development of human geography through its use of quantitative and ethnographic research methods. The importance of theories developed by the Chicago School within urban sociology has been both sustained and critiqued; yet it remains one of the most significant historical advancements in understanding urbanization and the city within the social sciences. The discipline may draw from several fields, including cultural sociology, economic sociology, and political sociology.

== Development and rise ==
Urban sociology rose to prominence among North American academics through a group of sociologists and theorists at the University of Chicago from the 1910s to the 1940s, who came to be known as the Chicago School of Sociology. The Chicago School of Sociology combined sociological and anthropological theory with ethnographic fieldwork to understand how individuals, groups, and communities interact within urban social systems. Unlike the primarily macro-based sociology that had marked earlier subfields, members of the Chicago School placed greater emphasis on micro-scale social interactions that sought to provide subjective meaning to how humans interact under structural, cultural, and social conditions. The theory of symbolic interaction, the basis through which many methodologically groundbreaking ethnographies were framed in this period, took its primitive shape alongside urban sociology and shaped its early methodological leanings. Symbolic interaction was forged out of the writings of early micro-sociologists George Mead and Max Weber, and sought to frame how individuals interpret symbols in everyday interactions. With early urban sociologists framing the city as a 'superorganism', the concept of symbolic interaction helped parse how individual communities contribute to the seamless functioning of the city itself.

Scholars of the Chicago School originally sought to answer a single question: how did the rise of urbanism during the Industrial Revolution contribute to the magnification of contemporary social problems? Sociologists centered on Chicago due to its tabula rasa state, having expanded from a small town of 10,000 in 1860 to an urban metropolis of over two million in the next half-century. Along with this expansion came many of the era's emerging social problems – ranging from issues with concentrated homelessness and harsh living conditions to the low wages and long hours that characterized the work of the many newly arrived European immigrants. Furthermore, unlike many other metropolitan areas, Chicago did not expand outward at the edges as predicted by early expansionist theorists, but instead 'reformatted' the available space in a concentric-ring pattern. As with many modern cities, the business district occupied the city center and was surrounded by slums and blighted neighborhoods, which were further surrounded by workingmen's homes and the early forms of the modern suburbs. Urban theorists suggested that these spatially distinct regions helped to solidify and isolate class relations within the modern city, moving the middle class away from the urban core and into the privatized environment of the outer suburbs.

Due to the high concentration of first-generation immigrant families in the inner city of Chicago during the early 20th century, many prominent early studies in urban sociology focused on the transmission of immigrants' native culture roles and norms into new and developing environments. Political participation and the rise of inter-community organizations were also frequently covered during this period, with many metropolitan areas adopting census techniques that enabled information to be stored and easily accessed by participating institutions such as the University of Chicago. Park, Burgess, and McKenzie, professors at the University of Chicago and three of the earliest proponents of urban sociology, developed the Subculture Theories, which helped to explain the often-positive role of local institutions on the formation of community acceptance and social ties. When race relations break down, and expansion renders one's community members anonymous, as was proposed to be occurring in this period, the inner city becomes marked by high levels of social disorganization that prevents local ties from being established and maintained in local political arenas.

The rise of urban sociology coincided with the expansion of statistical inference in the behavioral sciences, which helped ease its transition and acceptance within educational institutions, alongside other burgeoning social sciences. Micro-sociology courses at the University of Chicago were among the earliest and most prominent in the United States on urban sociological research.

== Evolution of the discipline ==
The evolution and transition of sociological theory from the Chicago School began to emerge in the 1970s with the publication of Claude Fischer's (1975) "Toward a Theory of Subculture Urbanism" which incorporated Bourdieu's theories on social capital and symbolic capital within the invasion and succession framework of the Chicago School in explaining how cultural groups form, expand and solidify a neighbourhood. The theme of transition by subcultures and groups within the city was further expanded by Barry Wellman's (1979) "The Community Question: The Intimate Networks of East Yorkers", which determined the function and position of the individual, institution, and community in the urban landscape in relation to their community. Wellman's categorization and incorporation of community-focused theories, such as "Community Lost", "Community Saved", and "Community Liberated", which center around the structure of the urban community in shaping interactions between individuals and facilitating active participation in the local community, are explained in detail below:

Community lost: The earliest of the three theories, this concept was developed in the late 19th century to account for the rapid development of industrial patterns that seemed to cause rifts between the individual and their local community. Urbanites were claimed to hold networks that were "impersonal, transitory and segmental", maintaining ties in multiple social networks while at the same time lacking the strong ties that bound them to any specific group. This disorganization, in turn, caused members of urban communities to subsist almost solely on secondary affiliations with others and rarely allowed them to rely on other members of the community for assistance with their needs.

Community saved: A critical response to the community lost theory that developed during the 1960s, the community saved argument suggests that multistranded ties often emerge in sparsely-knit communities as time goes on, and that urban communities often possess these strong ties, albeit in different forms. Especially in low-income communities, individuals tend to adapt to their environment and pool resources to protect themselves collectively against structural changes. Over time, urban communities tend to become "urban villages", where individuals have strong ties to only a few people who connect them to an intricate web of other urbanites within the same local environment.

Community liberated: A cross-section of the community lost, and community saved arguments, the community liberated theory suggests that the separation of workplace, residence, and familial kinship groups has caused urbanites to maintain weak ties across multiple community groups, which are further weakened by high rates of residential mobility. However, the concentration of environments in the city for interaction increases the likelihood that individuals will develop secondary ties, even as they simultaneously maintain distance from tightly knit communities. Primary ties that offer the individual assistance in everyday life arise from sparsely knit and spatially dispersed interactions, with the individual's access to resources depending on the quality of the ties they maintain within their community.

Along with the development of these theories, urban sociologists have increasingly studied the differences among urban, rural, and suburban environments over the last half-century. Consistent with the community-liberated argument, researchers have found that, in large part, urban residents tend to maintain more spatially dispersed networks of ties than rural or suburban residents. Among lower-income urban residents, the lack of mobility and communal space within the city often disrupts the formation of social ties and fosters an unintegrated, distant community. While the high density of networks within the city weakens relations between individuals, it increases the likelihood that at least one individual in a network can provide the primary support found in smaller, more tightly knit networks. Since the 1970s, research into social networks has focused primarily on the types of ties developed within residential environments. Bonding ties, common in tightly knit neighborhoods, consist of connections that provide an individual with primary support, such as access to income or upward mobility within a neighborhood organization. Bridging ties, in contrast, are ties that weakly connect strong networks of individuals. A group of communities concerned about the placement of a nearby highway may only be connected through a few individuals who represent their views at a community board meeting, for instance.

However, as the theory surrounding social networks has developed, sociologists such as Alejandro Portes and the Wisconsin model of sociological research have placed greater emphasis on the importance of these weak ties. While strong ties are necessary for providing residents with primary services and a sense of community, weak ties bring together elements of different cultural and economic landscapes in solving problems affecting a great number of individuals. As theorist Eric Oliver notes, neighborhoods with vast social networks most commonly rely on heterogeneous support in problem-solving and are the most politically active.

As the suburban landscape developed during the 20th century and the outer city became a refuge for the wealthy and, later, the burgeoning middle class, sociologists and urban geographers such as Harvey Molotch, David Harvey and Neil Smith began to study the structure and revitalization of the most impoverished areas of the inner city. In their research, impoverished neighborhoods, which often rely on tightly knit local ties for economic and social support, were found to be targeted by developers for gentrification, displacing residents in these communities. Political experimentation in providing these residents with semi-permanent housing and structural support – ranging from Section 8 housing to Community Development Block Grant programs- has, in many cases, eased the transition of low-income residents into stable housing and employment. Yet research on the social impact of forced movement among these residents has noted the difficulties individuals often face in maintaining a level of economic comfort, spurred by rising land values and inter-urban competition among cities to attract capital investment. The interaction between inner-city dwellers and middle class passersby in such settings has also been a topic of study for urban sociologists.

In a September 2015 issue of "City & Community(C&C)," the article discusses plans and research needed for the future. The article proposes steps to respond to urban trends, create a safer environment, and prepare for future urbanization. The steps include: publishing more C&C articles, conducting more research on segregation in metropolitan areas, focusing on trends and patterns in segregation and poverty, reducing micro-level segregation, and conducting research on international changes in urbanization. However, in a June 2018 issue of C&C, Mike Owen Benediktsson argues that spatial inequality, the idea of a lack of resources through a specific space, would be problematic for the future of urban sociology. Problems in neighborhoods arise from political forms and issues. He argues that attention should be more on the relationship between spaces rather than the expansion of more urban cities.

On the opposite side of the Atlantic Ocean, in Europe, urban sociology is growing, with large debates coordinated by ESA RN 37. In Paris, the so called Urban School of Sciences Po has fundamentally advanced the understanding of how cities are governed through incomplete, conflictual, and negotiated arrangements, as proved in the work by Patrick Le Galès on fragmented, discontinuous and non linear urban and metropolitan governance. Tommaso Vitale has theorized mechanisms such as contentious embeddedness and decommodification to explain how marginalized groups interact with institutions, policies, and urban spaces.

== Criticism ==
Many theories in urban sociology have been criticized, most prominently for the ethnocentric approaches of early theorists who laid the groundwork for urban studies throughout the 20th century. Early theories that framed the city as an adaptable "superorganism" often disregarded the intricate roles of social ties within local communities, suggesting that the urban environment itself, rather than the individuals living within it, controlled the city's spread and shape. For impoverished inner-city residents, the role of highway planning policies and other government-spurred initiatives instituted by the planner Robert Moses and others has been criticized as unsightly and unresponsive to residential needs. The slow development of empirically based urban research reflects the failure of local urban governments to adapt and ease the transition of residents to the short-lived industrialization of the city.

Some modern social theorists have also been critical of the apparent shortsightedness that urban sociologists have shown toward the role of culture in the inner city. William Julius Wilson has criticized the theory developed in the middle of the twentieth century for relying primarily on the structural roles of institutions rather than on how culture itself affects common aspects of inner-city life, such as poverty. The distance shown toward this topic, he argues, presents an incomplete picture of inner-city life. Urban sociological theory is viewed as an important aspect of sociology.

The concept of urban sociology as a whole has often been challenged and criticized by sociologists through time. Several aspects of race, land, resources, and related issues have broadened the idea. Manuel Castells questioned whether urban sociology even exists and devoted 40 years' worth of research to redefine and reorganize the concept. With the growing population and the majority of Americans living in suburbs, Castells believes that most researchers focus their work in urban sociology around cities, neglecting the other major communities of suburbs, towns, and rural areas. He also believes that urban sociologists have overcomplicated the term "urban sociology" and should provide a clearer, more organized explanation of their work, arguing that a "Sociology of Settlements" would address most issues surrounding the term.

Urban sociologists focus on a range of concepts such as peri-urban settlements, human overpopulation, and field studies of urban social interaction. Perry Burnett, who studied at the University of Southern Indiana, researched the idea of Urban sprawl and city optimization for the human population. Some sociologists study the relationships between urban patterns/policy and social issues such as racial discrimination or high-income taxes.

== See also ==
- Bibliography of sociology
- Community studies
- Ekistics
- Index of urban studies articles
- Garden city movement
- List of urban sociology topics
- Rural sociology
- Social geography
- Social theory
- Sociology of architecture
- Sociology of space
- Urban anthropology
- Urban culture
- Urban economics
- Urban history
- Urban planning
- Urban tribe
- Urban vitality
