= William Alonso =

Argentine-American economist (1933–1999)

- Born: January 29, 1933; Buenos Aires, Argentina
- Died: February 11, 1999 (aged 66); Boston, Massachusetts, United States

Academic background
- Education: Harvard University University of Pennsylvania

Academic work
- Discipline: Urban economics
- Notable ideas: Alonso model

William Alonso (January 29, 1933 – February 11, 1999) was an Argentine-American planner and economist.

He was born in Buenos Aires but moved to the United States in 1946 during the Perón regime with his father Amado Alonso, a leading Spanish philologist, who was then appointed at Harvard. He earned a bachelor's degree in architectural science from Harvard in 1954 and a master's degree in city planning from Harvard University's Graduate School of Public Administration in 1956. In 1960 he received a doctorate in regional science from the University of Pennsylvania.

From 1960 to 1961 Alonso worked as director and professor in the Department of Regional and Urban Planning at the Bandung Institute of Technology in Indonesia. He then served as a visiting professor at the Universidad Central de Venezuela in 1962 before coming to Harvard as the acting director of the Center of Urban Studies from 1963 to 1965. Alonso also worked at Yale University, the University of California at Berkeley, and Stanford University.

In 1976 Alonso became Director of the Center for Population Studies of Harvard University. Two years later he became the Richard Saltonstall professor of population policy in the Faculty of Public Health and a member of the Department of Sociology in the Faculty of Arts and Sciences.

His research was focused on demographic changes, in particular in very urbanized areas. He developed a mathematical model connecting migration and the evolution of the distribution of population.

In 1964, he published Location and Land Use, in which he defined a modeled approach to the formation of land rent in urban environments. His model became one of the pillars of urban economics.

== See also ==
- Bid rent theory
