= Sector model =

Model of urban land use proposed in 1939

A basic version of the Sector model

The sector model, also known as the Hoyt model, is a model of urban land use proposed in 1939 by land economist Homer Hoyt. It is a modification of the concentric zone model of city development. The benefits of the application of this model include the fact it allows for an outward progression of growth. As with all simple models of such complex phenomena, its validity is limited.

== Application ==
This model applies to numerous British cities. Also, if it is turned 90 degrees counter-clockwise it fits the city of Mönchengladbach reasonably accurately. This may be because of the age of the cities when transportation was a key, as a general rule older cities follow the Hoyt model and more recent cities follow the Burgess (concentric zone) model.

== Limitations ==
The theory is based on early twentieth-century rail transport and does not make allowances for private cars that enable commuting from cheaper land outside city boundaries. This occurred in Calgary in the 1930s when many near-slums were established outside the city but close to the termini of the street car lines. These are now incorporated into the city boundary but are pockets of low-cost housing in medium cost areas. The theory also does not take into account the new concepts of edge cities and boomburbs, which began to emerge in the 1980s, after the creation of the model. Since its creation, the traditional Central Business District has diminished in importance as many retail and office buildings have moved into the suburbs.

- Physical features - physical features may restrict or direct growth along certain wedges
- The growth of a sector can be limited by leapfrog land.
- The theory too lacks the idea based on land topography.

== See also ==
- Urban structure
- Linear city
