= Concentric zone model =

Urban social structure model

Key (from outside to inside) Commuter zone (outer ring) Residential zone Working class zone Zone of transition Factory zone Central business district (center)

The concentric zone model, also known as the Burgess model or the CCD model, is one of the earliest theoretical models to explain urban social structures. It was created by sociologist Ernest Burgess in 1925.

== The model ==
Based on human ecology theory done by Burgess and applied on Chicago, it was the first to give the explanation of distribution of social groups within urban areas. This concentric ring model depicts urban land usage in concentric rings: the Central Business District (or CBD) was in the middle of the model, and the city is expanded in rings with different land uses. It is effectively an urban version of Von Thünen's regional land use model developed a century earlier. It influenced the later development of Homer Hoyt's sector model (1939) and Harris and Ullman's multiple nuclei model (1945).

The zones identified are:

1. The center with the central business district,
2. The transition zone of mixed residential and commercial uses or the zone of transition,
3. Working class residential homes (inner suburbs), in later decades called inner city or zone of independent working men's home,
4. Better quality middle-class homes (outer suburbs) or zone of better housing,
5. Commuter zone, high-class homes on outskirts of outer suburbs - homeowner can afford to commute to central business district.

The model is more detailed than the traditional down-mid-uptown divide by which downtown is the CBD, uptown the affluent residential outer ring, and midtown in between.

Bid rent curve

Burgess's work helped generate the bid rent curve. This theory states that the concentric circles are based on the amount that people will pay for the land. This value is based on the profits that are obtainable from maintaining a business on that land. The center of the town will have the highest number of customers so it is profitable for retail activities. Manufacturing will pay slightly less for the land as they are only interested in the accessibility for workers, 'goods in' and 'goods out'. Residential land use will take the surrounding land.

== Criticisms ==
The model has been challenged by many contemporary urban geographers. First, the model does not work well with cities outside the United States, in particular with those developed under different historical contexts. Even in the United States, because of changes such as advancement in transportation and information technology and transformation in global economy, cities are no longer organized with clear "zones" (see: Los Angeles School of Urban Analysis).

- It describes the peculiar American geography, where the inner city is poor while suburbs are wealthy; the inverse is the norm elsewhere.
- It assumes an isotropic plane – an even, unchanging landscape.
  - Physical features – land may restrict growth of certain sectors; hills and water features may make some locations unusually desirable for residential purposes.
- Commuter villages defy the theory, being a distant part of the commuter zone.
- Decentralization of shops, manufacturing industry (see Industrial suburb), and entertainment.
- Urban regeneration and gentrification – more expensive property can be found in formerly 'low class' housing areas.
- Many new housing estates were built on the edges of cities in Britain.
- It does not address local urban politics and forces of globalization.
- The model does not fit polycentric cities, for example Stoke-on-Trent.

== See also ==
- 100 percent corner
- Concentric circles
- Core frame model
- Distance decay
- Friction of distance
- Multiple nuclei model
- Onion model
- Sector model (Hoyt model)
- Transect (urban)
- Tobler's first law of geography
- Urban structure
- Johann Heinrich von Thünen's ring model
