= Bid rent theory =

Geographical economic theory

Bid rent curve

The bid rent theory is a geographical economic theory that refers to how the price and demand for real estate change as the distance from the central business district (CBD) increases. Bid rent theory was developed by William Alonso in 1964, it was extended from the von Thünen model, who analyzed agricultural land use. The first theoretician of the bid rent effect was David Ricardo. It states that different land users will compete with one another for land close to the city centre. This is based upon the idea that retail establishments wish to maximize their profitability, so they are much more willing to pay more for land close to the CBD and less for land further away from this area. This theory is based upon the reasoning that the more accessible an area (i.e., the greater the concentration of customers), the more profitable.

== Explanation ==
Land users all compete for the most accessible land within the CBD. The amount they are willing to pay is called "bid rent". The result is a pattern of concentric rings of land use, creating the concentric zone model.

It could be assumed that, according to this theory, the poorest houses and buildings would be on the very outskirts of the city, as this is the only location that they can afford to occupy. In modern times, however, this is rarely the case, as many people prefer to trade off the accessibility of being close to the CBD and move to the edges of a settlement, where it is possible to buy more land for the same amount of money (as the bid rent theory states). Likewise, lower-income housing trades off greater living space for increased accessibility to employment. For this reason, low-income housing in many North American cities, for example, is often found in the inner city, and high-income housing is at the edges of the settlement.

== Agricultural analogy ==
Although later used in the context of urban analysis, though not yet using this term, the bid rent theory was first developed in an agricultural context. One of the first theoreticians of bid rent effects was David Ricardo, according to whom the rent on the most productive land is based on its advantage over the least productive, the competition among farmers ensuring that the full advantages go to the landlords in the form of rent. This theory was later developed by J. H. von Thünen, who combined it with the notion of transport costs. His model implies that the rent at any location is equal to the value of its product minus production costs and transport costs. Admitting that transportation costs are constant for all activities, this will lead to a situation where activities with the highest production costs are located near the marketplace, while those with low production costs are farther away.

The concentric land-use structure thus generated closely resembles the urban model described above: CBD – high residential – low residential. This model, introduced by William Alonso, was inspired by von Thünen's model.

== Bid rent theory in the central business district ==
Land users, whether they be retail, office, or residential, all compete for the most accessible land within the central business district (CBD). The amount they are willing to pay is called bid rent. This can generally be shown in a "bid rent curve", based on the reasoning that the most accessible land, generally in the centre, is the most expensive land.

Commerce (in particular large department stores and chain stores) is willing to pay the greatest rent in order to be located in the inner core. The inner core is very valuable for these users because it is traditionally the most accessible location for a large population. This large population is essential for department stores, which require a considerable turnover. As a result, they are willing and able to pay a very high land rent value. They maximize the potential of their site by building many stories. As one travels farther from the inner core, the amount that commerce is willing to pay declines rapidly.

Industry, however, is willing to pay to be in the outer core. There is more land available for factories, but it still has many of the benefits of the inner core, such as a marketplace and good transportation linkages.

As one goes farther out, the land becomes less attractive to industry because of the reducing transportation linkages and a decreasing marketplace. Because householders do not rely heavily on these factors and can afford the reduced costs (compared with those in the inner and outer core), they can purchase land here. The farther from the inner core, the cheaper the land. This is why inner-city areas are very densely populated (with, e.g., terraces, flats, and high rises), while suburbs and rural areas are more sparsely populated (with semi-detached and detached houses).

== Application of bid rent theory ==
Bid rent theory has been operationalized in agent-based modelling, where it has been used to simulate the conversion of agricultural land into urban development, in a concentric city model.
