= Urban structure =

Arrangement of land use in urban areas

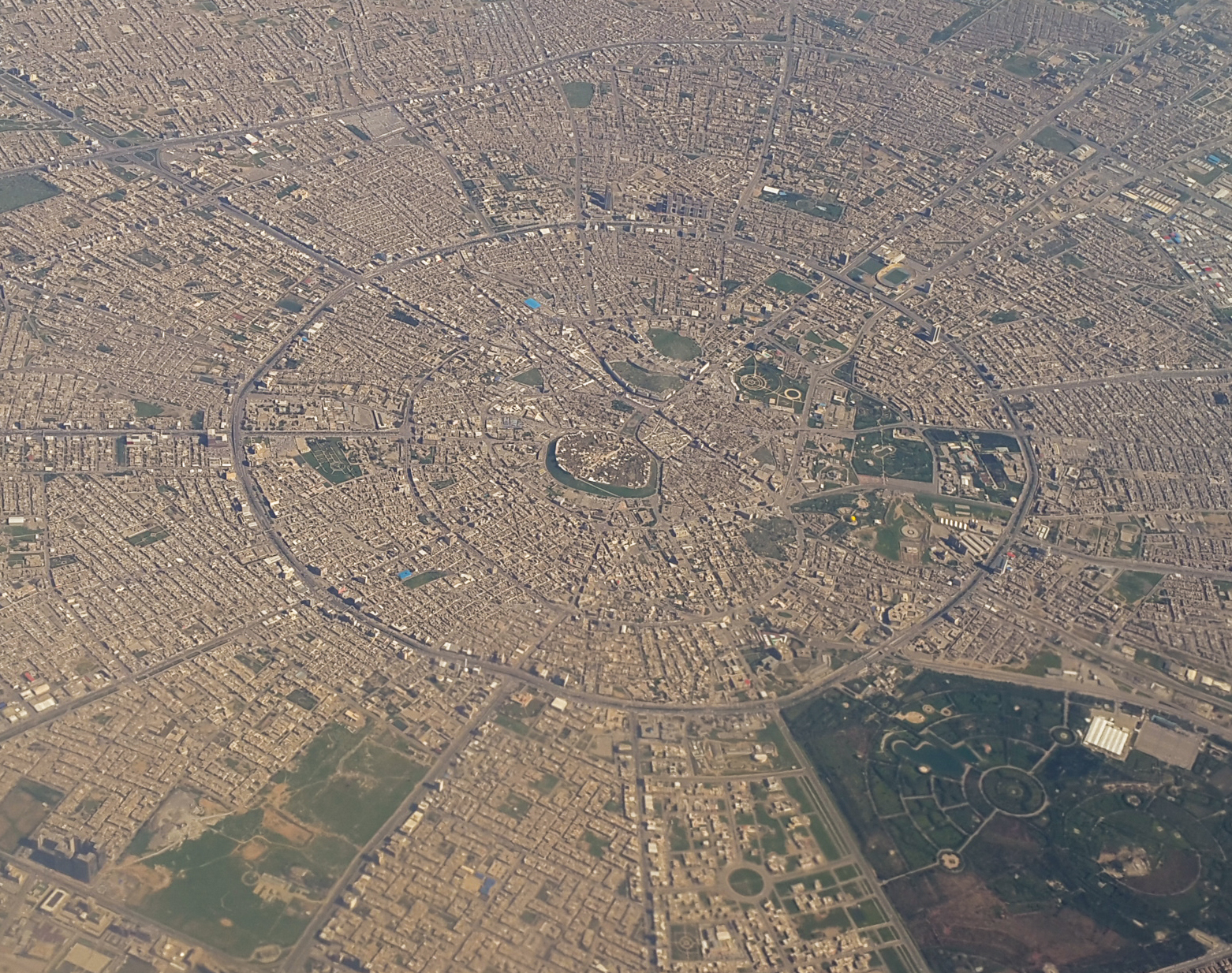
The city of Arbil in the Kurdistan Region of Iraq has a radial urban structure centred on an ancient fortress

Urban structure is the arrangement of land use in urban areas, in other words, how the land use of a city is set out. Urban planners, economists, and geographers have developed several models that explain where different types of people and businesses tend to exist within the urban setting. Urban structure can also refer to urban spatial structure, which concerns the arrangement of public and private space in cities and the degree of connectivity and accessibility.

== Zonal model ==
This model was the first to explain distribution of social groups within urban areas. Based on one single city, Chicago, it was created by sociologist Ernest Burgess in 1924. According to this model, a city grows outward from a central point in a series of concentric rings. The innermost ring represents the central business district. It is surrounded by a second ring, the zone of transition, which contains industry and poorer-quality housing. The third ring contains housing for the working-class and is called the zone of independent workers' homes. The fourth ring has newer and larger houses usually occupied by the middle-class. This ring is called the zone of better residences. The outermost ring is called the commuter's zone. This zone represents people who choose to live in residential suburbs and take a daily commute into the CBD to work.

== Sectoral model ==
A second theory of urban structure was proposed in 1939 by an economist named Homer Hoyt. His model, the sector model, proposed that a city develops in sectors instead of rings. Certain areas of a city are more attractive for various activities, whether by chance or geographic and environmental reasons. As the city grows and these activities flourish and expand outward, they do so in a wedge and become a sector of the city. If a district is set up for high income housing, for example, any new development in that district will expand from the outer edge.

To some degree this theory is just a refinement on the concentric model rather than a radical restatement. Both Hoyt and Burgess claimed Chicago supported their models. Burgess claimed that Chicago's central business district was surrounded by a series of rings, broken only by Lake Michigan. Hoyt argued that the best housing developed north from the central business district along Lake Michigan, while industry located along major rail lines and roads to the south, southwest, and northwest.

Calgary, Alberta almost perfectly fits Hoyt's sector model.

== Multiple nuclei model ==
Geographers Chauncy Harris and Edward Ullman developed the multiple nuclei model in 1945. According to this model, a city contains more than one center around which activities revolve. Some activities are attracted to particular nodes while others try to avoid them. For example, a university node may attract well-educated residents, pizzerias, and bookstores, whereas an airport may attract hotels and warehouses. Other businesses may also form clusters, sometimes known locally as Iron Triangles for automobile repair or red light districts for prostitution, or arts districts. Incompatible activities will avoid clustering in the same area, explaining why heavy industry and high-income housing rarely exist in the same neighbourhood.
