= Ernest Burgess =

Canadian-American sociologist

Ernest W. Burgess
- Born: May 16, 1886; Tilbury, Ontario, Canada
- Died: December 27, 1966 (aged 80); Chicago, Illinois, United States
- Education: University of Chicago; Kingfisher College
- Scientific career
- Fields: Sociology
- Workplaces: University of Chicago; Ohio State University
- Doctoral advisor: Albion Woodbury Small
- Doctoral students: Albert J. Reiss; Anselm Strauss

Ernest Watson Burgess (May 16, 1886 – December 27, 1966) was a Canadian-American urban sociologist who was professor at the University of Chicago. He was the 24th President of the American Sociological Association (ASA).

== Early life ==
He was born in born in Tilbury, Ontario.

He was educated at Kingfisher College in Oklahoma and continued graduate studies in sociology at the University of Chicago. In 1916, he returned to the University of Chicago, as a faculty member. Burgess was hired as an urban sociologist at the University of Chicago.

== Scholarly work ==
Burgess conducted influential work in a number of areas.

=== Introductory sociology textbook ===
Five years after his arrival as a professor at the university of Chicago in 1921, Ernest Burgess would publish one of his most celebrated works. He collaborated with sociologist Robert Park to write a textbook called Introduction to the Science of Sociology (Park & Burgess, 1921). This was one of the most influential sociology texts ever written. Many people at the time referred to this book as the "Bible of Sociology". This book represented the observation and reflection of men who have seen life from very different points of view. The book discussed many topics such as the history of sociology, human nature, investigating problems, social interaction, competition, conflicts, assimilation and more.

Overturning the arguments of a still ascendant eugenics movement, Burgess and Park argued that social disorganization, not heredity, is the cause of disease, crime and other characteristics of slum life. As the passage of successive waves of immigrants through such districts demonstrated, it is the slum area itself, and not the particular group living there, with which social pathologies are associated.

Introduction to the Science of Sociology was so well organized and comprehensive that most graduate students, taught by University of Chicago alumni, were required to read it. This book was so informative that it was still being used decades after the death of Ernest Burgess.

=== Concentric zone model ===
Concentric zone model Commuter zone Residential zone Working class zone Zone of transition Factory zone CBD

Burgess' groundbreaking research, in conjunction with his colleague, Robert E. Park, provided the foundation for The Chicago School. In The City (Park, Burgess, & McKenzie, 1925) they conceptualized the city into the concentric zones (Concentric zone model), including the central business district, transitional (industrial, deteriorating housing), working-class residential (tenements), residential, and commuter/suburban zones. They also viewed cities as something that experiences evolution and change, in the Darwinian sense.

=== Burgess method of unit-weighted regression ===
In the field of criminology, Burgess conducted work on predicting the success or failure of inmates on parole. He identified 21 measures believed to be associated with success on parole, converting these measures to a score of zero or one, with a score of one associated with parole success. For example, a man lacking in job skills would have a score of zero, while a man with job skills would have a score of one. He then added the scores to obtain a scale in which higher scores predicted a greater chance of success on parole (Burgess, 1928). Burgess has been credited with the birth of actuarial dangerousness prediction (Harcourt, 2006)

The results showed that the scale worked well. To illustrate, for men with the highest scores from 14 to 21, the rate of parole success was 98%; for men with scores of 4 or less, the rate of parole success was only 24%. This method of combining scores has come to be called the Burgess method of unit-weighted regression. Hakeem (1948) reported that the Burgess method had "remarkable accuracy in prediction". Though more advanced methods of analysis have become common in the social sciences (such as multiple regression), they have yet to show a clear advantage over unit-weighted methods, so the Burgess method is still used in criminology.

=== Family and marriage ===
Ernest Burgess also spent a considerable amount of time studying the institutions of family and marriage. He was interested in developing a scientific measure that would predict a success rate in marriage. In his book Predicting Success or Failure in Marriage, which he wrote with Leonard Cottrell in 1939, he theorized that harmony in marriage requires a certain amount of adjustment in attitudes and social behavior by both the husband and the wife. Burgess and Cottrell developed a chart made for predicting marital success. In this chart they associated many different variables that they claimed affect stability in marriage. Burgess and Cottrell were however, often criticized for this work, since they attempted to measure marriage without actually including any component of love or affection. This is something that most people would say is the most important part of marriage. Notably, Ernest Burgess was never married.

=== Aging ===
Ernest Burgess also studied elderly people, especially the effects of retirement. This was something that was very neglected at that point in time. He collaborated with the government in researching the success of government programs for the elderly, the results of which were published in 1960 in the book Aging in Western Societies. Ernest Burgess served as the editor for this book. This book was the third volume in a three part series of handbooks written by the Inter-University Training Institute in Social Gerontology. Ernest Burgess was also involved with first and largest volume of the series. This volume dealt with comparative data and trends on subjects such as population structure, employment, retirement, income, housing and medical insurance. The second volume was made up of case studies from European countries and touched on such topics as housing, family relations, and senior centers. The third volume presented a statistical supplement of comparative data on conditions in different countries. The other five countries used are France, Italy, Netherlands, Sweden, and West Germany. These countries were selected because they were closest in social structure and culture to the United States. This was done so that the background experience of other societies could be used to better the understand aging in the United States. Although Burgess did not write much of this book he certainly left his mark serving as the editor and writing the introduction.

== Accomplishments ==
- President of Behavior Research Foundation (1931)
- President of American Sociological Society (1934)
- President of Sociological Research Association (1942)
- President of National Conference On Family Relations (1942)
- Chair of Sociology Department/ University of Chicago (1946)

== See also ==
- Chicago school (sociology)
- Louis Wirth
- Everett Stonequist
- Frederic Thrasher
- Social disorganization theory
