= Sandra Arlinghaus =

American educator

Sandra Lach Arlinghaus is an American geographer who is adjunct professor in the School for Environment and Sustainability (formerly School of Natural Resources and Environment) at the University of Michigan. Her research concerns mathematical geography much of which is archived in the persistent archive, Deep Blue, at The University of Michigan. She is the Founder of the Institute of Mathematical Geography (IMaGe) and of Solstice: An Electronic Journal of Geography and Mathematics; full archives of both are also archived in Deep Blue. She is noted as a 'mathematician' in the online Mathematical Genealogy Project of the North Dakota State University/American Mathematical Society that is housed online. She has served on various boards of directors (in addition to IMaGe), including (but not limited to): Project My Heart / Your Heart, Chene Street History Study, and Meridian Architectural Trust.

== Education ==
Arlinghaus has an A.B. in Mathematics from Vassar College, an MA in geography from Wayne State University, and a PhD in Theoretical Geography from the University of Michigan.

== Books ==
Arlinghaus is the author or co-author of several books on mathematical geography, including but not limited to:

- Teaching Mathematics Using Interactive Mapping, with Joseph Kerski and William C. Arlinghaus (CRC Press/Routledge, 2023)
- Spatial Thinking in Environmental Contexts: Maps, Archives, and Timelines, with Joseph Kerski, Ann E. Larimore, and Matthew Naud (CRC Press, 2019).
- Spatial Mathematics: Theory and Practice through Mapping, with Joseph Kerski (CRC Press, 2013)
- Graph Theory and Geography: An Interactive View, eBook, with William C. Arlinghaus and Frank Harary (Wiley, 2002)
- Practical Handbook of Spatial Statistics, with Daniel A. Griffith (CRC Press, 1995)
- Practical Handbook of Digital Mapping: Terms and Concepts, with Robert F. Austin (CRC Press, 1994)
- Practical Handbook of Curve Fitting (CRC Press, 1994)
