= Spatial Mathematics: Theory and Practice through Mapping =

2013 mathematics book

- First edition
- Author: Sandra Arlinghaus, Joseph Kerski
- Language: English
- Genre: Mathematics
- Publication date: 2013

Spatial Mathematics: Theory and Practice through Mapping is a book on the mathematics that underlies geographic information systems and spatial analysis. It was written by Sandra Arlinghaus and Joseph Kerski, and published in 2013 by the CRC Press.

== Topics ==
The book has 10 chapters, divided into two sections on geodesy and on techniques for visualization of spatial data; each chapter has separate sections on theory and practice. For practical aspects of geographic information systems it uses ArcGIS as its example system.

In the first part of the book, Chapters 1 and 2 covers the geoid, the geographic coordinate system of latitudes and longitudes, and the measurement of distance and location. Chapter 3 concerns data structures for geographic information systems, data formatting based on raster graphics and vector graphics, methods for buffer analysis, and its uses in turning point and line data into area data. Later in the book, but fitting thematically into this part, chapter 9 covers map projections.

Moving from geodesy to visualization, chapters 4 and 5 concern the use of color and scale on maps. Chapter 6 concerns the types of data to be visualized, and the types of visualizations that can be made for them. Chapter 7 concerns spatial hierarchies and central place theory, while chapter 8 covers the analysis of spatial distributions in terms of their covariance. Finally, chapter 10 covers network and non-Euclidean data.

Additional material on the theoretical concepts behind the topics of the book is provided on a web site, accessed through QR codes included in the book.

== Audience and reception ==
Reviewer reactions to the book were mixed. Several reviewers noted that, for a book with "mathematics" in its title, the book was surprisingly non-mathematical, with both Azadeh Mousavi and Paul Harris calling the title "misleading". Harris complains that "the maths is treated quite lightly and superficially". Alfred Stein notes the almost total absence of mathematical equations, and Daniel A. Griffith similarly notes the lack of proof of its mathematical claims.

Mousavi also writes that, although the book covers a broad selection of topics, it "suffers from lack of necessary depth" and that it is confusingly structured. Sang-Il Lee points to a lack of depth as the book's principal weakness. Stein notes that its reliance on a specific version of ArcGIS makes it difficult to reproduce its examples, especially for international users with different versions or for users of versions updated after its publication. Another weakness highlighted by Griffith is "its limited connection to the existing literature, with its citations far too often being only those works by its authors". Harris sees a missed opportunity in the omission of spatial statistics, movement data, and spatio-temporal data, the design of spatial data structures, and advanced techniques for visualizing geospatial data.

Nevertheless, Mousavi recommends this book as an "introductory text on spatial information science" aimed at practitioners, and commends its use of QR codes and word clouds. Stein praises the book's attempt to bridge mathematics and geography, and its potential use as a first step towards that bridge for practitioners. Harris suggests it "in an introductory and applied context", and in combination with a more conventional textbook on geographic information systems. Lee argues that the overview of fundamental concepts and cross-disciplinary connections forged by the book make it "worth reading by anyone interested in the geospatial sciences". And Griffith concludes that the book is successful in motivating its readers to "explore formal mathematical subject matter that interfaces with geography".
