= Robert N. Saveland =

Robert N. Saveland was an American professor emeritus of education and geography at University of Georgia. In 2012 National Council for Geographic Education awarded him the George J. Miller Award. From 1968 to 1985 Saveland served as social science education professor at College of Education. Died Nov. 23, 2017 in Athens, GA.

== Works ==
- Geography of Missouri: A Story of the People and the Regions of "Show Me" State
- A World View
