= Daniel A. Griffith =

American geographer and spatial statistician

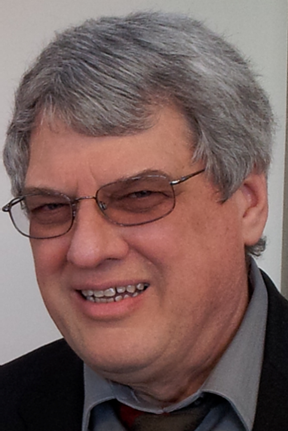
- Griffith in 2012
- Born: 1948 (age 77–78)
- Alma mater: Indiana University of Pennsylvania; University of Toronto; Pennsylvania State University
- Known for: Research on spatial autocorrelation; Moran eigenvector spatial filtering (MESF)
- Scientific career
- Fields: Geography; Spatial statistics; Geographic information science
- Workplaces: University of Texas at Dallas

Daniel A. Griffith (born 1948) is an American geographer and spatial statistician whose research addresses spatial autocorrelation analysis and related methods in quantitative geography. He is an Ashbel Smith Professor Emeritus of Geospatial Information Sciences at the University of Texas at Dallas.

He has served as editor of Geographical Analysis, and other academic journals, and is a fellow of the Royal Society of Canada, the American Association for the Advancement of Science, the American Statistical Association, and other professional organizations. He received a Guggenheim Fellowship in 2001.

== Early life and education ==
Griffith earned a B.S. in mathematics and an M.A. in geography from the Indiana University of Pennsylvania, a Ph.D. in geography from the University of Toronto, and an M.S. in statistics from Pennsylvania State University.

== Career ==
Griffith has held academic positions at several universities, including the University of Miami and the University of Texas at Dallas, where he held the Ashbel Smith Professorship in Geospatial Information Sciences and later became professor emeritus. In 2008 he was appointed editor of Geographical Analysis.

== Research ==
Griffith's research focuses on spatial statistics and the analysis of geographic data. His work encompasses spatial autocorrelation, spatial econometrics, eigenvector spatial filtering, and the statistical modeling of spatial relationships. He has published in geography, regional science, economics, mathematics, ecology, epidemiology, computer science, and environmental science .

Griffith's work examines spatial autocorrelation and its effects on statistical and other mathematical analysis. His research spans spatial statistics, regression modeling, and quantitative geography, with applications and theoretical contributions extending to urban economics, public health and epidemiology, the mathematics of art, and the mathematical geography of Löschian numbers.

Griffith has contributed to the theoretical development and methodological advancement of eigenvector spatial filtering, a method used to account for spatial dependence in statistical models. His publications examine the method's theoretical basis and applications in geography, regional science, spatial statistics, and ecology.

Griffith's research in spatial econometrics concerns the effects of geographic relationships on economic, demographic, and social data. His work includes spatial modeling, regional analysis, and the application of statistical methods to geographic data. ScholarGPS has ranked placed him among its highly ranked scholars in economics.

Griffith has applied spatial statistical methods to environmental health research. His work includes a study of childhood blood lead levels in Syracuse, New York, part of which is published in Annals of the Association of American Geographers in 1998. The study examined the geographic distribution of childhood lead exposure across the city.

The research was covered by The Post-Standard on December 2, 2002, and by the Syracuse Record, Syracuse Herald-Journal, SU Alumni News, and Syracuse University Magazine in 1996. Maps from the project were included in the City of Syracuse's 1997–1998 Consolidated Plan submitted to the U.S. Department of Housing and Urban Development. The project was also included in a 1997 congressional briefing on geographic information systems.

Griffith's publications examine the statistical properties of spatial models, including methods for representing spatial dependence and spatially correlated random variables. His later work has addressed alternative specifications of spatial autoregressive models.

== Honors and awards ==
- Guggenheim Fellowship (2001).
- Doctor of Science, honoris causa, Indiana University of Pennsylvania (2006)
- Fellow, Regional Science Association International (2009)
- Fellow, American Association for the Advancement of Science (2011/2012 announcement).
- Fellow, American Statistical Association (2015).
- Fellow, Royal Society of Canada (2017).
- Albert Nelson Marquis Lifetime Achievement Award (2017)
- Fellow, American Association of Geographers (2019).
- Jean Paelinck Award, Regional Science Association International (2021).
- Walter Isard Award, North American Regional Science Council
- Fellow, Spatial Econometrics Association
- Fellow, University Consortium for Geographic Information Science
- Fellow, New York Academy of Sciences
- Peter Burrough Medal, International Spatial Accuracy Research Association
- J. Warren Nystrom Dissertation Award, American Association of Geographers

== Selected publications ==
- Griffith, Daniel A. (2003). Spatial Autocorrelation and Spatial Filtering: Gaining Understanding Through Theory and Scientific Visualization. Advances in Spatial Science. Springer. doi:10.1007/978-3-540-24806-4. ISBN 978-3-540-24806-4.
- Griffith, Daniel A. (1987). Spatial Autocorrelation: A Primer. Association of American Geographers. ISBN 0892911972.
- Anselin, Luc; Griffith, Daniel A. (1988). "Do Spatial Effects Really Matter in Regression Analysis?". Papers of the Regional Science Association. 65 (1): 11–34. Bibcode:1988PRegS..65...11A. doi:10.1111/j.1435-5597.1988.tb01155.x.
- Griffith, Daniel A.; Peres-Neto, Pedro R. (2006). "SPATIAL MODELING IN ECOLOGY: THE FLEXIBILITY OF EIGENFUNCTION SPATIAL ANALYSES". Ecology. 87 (10): 2603–2613. doi:10.1890/0012-9658(2006)87[2603:SMIETF]2.0.CO;2. ISSN 0012-9658.
- Griffith, Daniel A.; Doyle, Philip G.; Wheeler, David C.; Johnson, David L. (1998). "A Tale of Two Swaths: Urban Childhood Blood-Lead Levels across Syracuse, New York". Annals of the Association of American Geographers. 88 (4): 640–665. doi:10.1111/0004-5608.00116. ISSN 0004-5608.
- Griffith, Daniel A.; Li, Bin (2025), "Spatial autocorrelation is everywhere!", Spatial Autocorrelation, Elsevier, pp. 45–82, ISBN 978-0-443-41743-6
- Griffith, Daniel A. (2025). "Beyond Auto‐Models: Self‐Correlated Sui‐Model Respecifications". Geographical Analysis. 57 (1): 127–151. doi:10.1111/gean.12411. ISSN 0016-7363.
