= Joseph Kerski =

American geographer and fiction writer

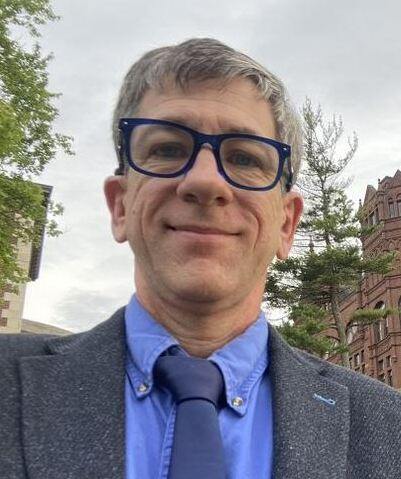
- Kerski in 2023
- Occupation: Geographer

Academic background
- Education: University of Colorado; University of Kansas
- Thesis: (2000)

Academic work
- Discipline: Geography
- Sub-discipline: geography education
- Institutions: Esri
- Website: https://www.josephkerski.com

Joseph Kerski is a geographer with a focus on the use of Geographic Information Systems (GIS) in education.

== Education ==
Kerski holds three degrees in geography: a bachelor's from the University of Colorado, a master's from the University of Kansas and a PhD from the University of Colorado.

== Roles and contributions ==
Joseph Kerski was the President of the National Council for Geographic Education in 2011. He is the author of the book Interpreting Our World and is the co-author of the book The Essentials of the Environment.

He has served as a geographer in 5 major sectors of society, including government (with NOAA, the US Census Bureau, and the US Geological Survey), academia (with Sinte Gleska University, the University of Denver, and as MOOC instructor for Penn State University, Elmhurst College, and eNet Learning), private industry (as Education Manager for Esri), nonprofit organizations (with roles including the President of the National Council for Geographic Education, the American Association of Geographers and others), and as an independent education consultant.

== Scholarship ==
Joseph Kerski has created over 9,000 videos on the Our Earth channel, co-authors a long-running blog about geospatial data called Spatial Reserves, and creates a career podcast for Directions Magazine called GeoInspirations. He has authored over 100 chapters and articles on Geographic Information Systems (GIS), education, physical and cultural geography, mathematics, fieldwork, teaching and learning, and related topics, and makes frequent presentations at conferences and university campuses. He is active in conducting professional development training for primary and secondary educators. He sits on the editorial Board of the Institute of Mathematical Geography (Solstice). He has authored or co-authored 12 books, including Teaching Mathematics Using Interactive Mapping, Building a Smarter Campus, Interpreting Our World: 100 Discoveries that Revolutionized Geography, Essentials of the Environment, Spatial Mathematics, Tribal GIS, International Perspectives on Teaching and Learning in Secondary Education and the GIS Guide to Public Domain Data. In 2018, he gave the first of two presentations on the Whys of Where at TEDx Vail, focusing on the importance of mapping and geotechnologies in education and society.

== Awards ==
- UCGIS University Consortium for GIScience Lifetime Achievement Award, 2021
- GeoTech Center Lifetime Achievement Award, 2016

== See also ==
- Sandra Arlinghaus—American geographer
- Duane Marble – American geographer (1931–2022)
- Geographic Information Science and Technology Body of Knowledge
- Jack Dangermond – American billionaire businessman
- Michael DeMers – American geographer and fiction writer
- Michael Frank Goodchild – British-American geographer
- Quantitative geography – Subfield of geographic methods
- Roger Tomlinson – English-Canadian geographer
- Technical geography – Study of spatial information
- Waldo Tobler – American geographer
