= National Council for Geographic Education =

Non-profit scientific and educational society

- Abbreviation: NCGE
- Formation: 1915
- Founder: George J Miller
- Type: Nonprofit Organization, scientific and educational society
- Legal status: 501(c)(3)Nonprofit Organization
- Headquarters: Washington D.C., U.S.
- Chief Executive Officer: Thomas M. Herman, PhD
- 2026 President: Celeste Reynolds
- 2027 President: John "Scott" Greene
- Website: http://www.ncge.org
- Formerly called: National Council for Geography Teachers

The National Council for Geographic Education (NCGE), chartered in 1915, is a non-profit scientific and educational society in the United States that supports geography education.

== History ==
George J. Miller, a professor at the Mankato Normal School, announced his interest in forming a national organization for geography education at a meeting of the National Education Association in St. Paul, Minnesota, in 1914. His goal was to bridge the gap between the subject expertise of college professors and the pedagogical training and insights of K-12 teachers. The purpose was to “increase the effectiveness of geography teaching in America”. The organization's establishment was approved at a meeting of the American Association of Geographers (AAG) in 1915, and the constitution adopted in 1916 called for a national board of directors and the establishment of state councils. The organization was called the National Council of Geography Teachers until its name was changed to the National Council for Geographic Education in 1956.

Since its founding, NCGE has held an annual conference to connect members and create opportunities for learning in workshops and through explorations of a wide variety of host cities. The first conference with saved records happened in December 1917 at the University of Chicago, one day prior to the annual meeting of the AAG. The practice of holding meetings during the holiday week and in conjunction with the AAG continued until 1948, though no meetings were held in war years of 1918 and 1942-45. Conferences have been held in conjunction with the International Geographical Union (1952 in Washington, DC and 2018 in Quebec City), the National Council for the Social Studies (Austin, 2019), and the Rocky Mountains/Great Plains Division of the AAG (Omaha, 2025). Since 1979, the conference has held its conference in a new North American city each year: Mexico City, Mexico (1979); Des Moines, IA (1980); Pittsburgh (1981); San Diego (1982); Ocho Rios, Jamaica (1983); Toronto, Ontario, Canada (1984); Breckenridge, CO (1985); Chicago (1986); Springfield, MI (1987); Snowbird, UT (1988); Hershey, PA (1989); Williamsburg, VA (1990); St. Paul, MN (1991); Santo Domingo, Dominican Republic (1992); Halifax, Nova Scotia (1993); Lexington, KY (1994); San Antonio, TX (1995); Santa Barbara, CA (1996); Orlando, FL (1997); Indianapolis, IN (1998); Boston (1999); Chicago, IL (2000); Vancouver, British Columbia, Canada (2001); Philadelphia (2002); Salt Lake City, UT (2003); Kansas City, MO (2004); Birmingham, AL (2005); Lake Tahoe, NV (2006); Oklahoma City, OK (2007); Dearborn, MI (2008); San Juan, Puerto Rico (2009); Savannah, GA (2010); Portland, OR (2011); San Marcos, TX (2012); Denver (2013); Memphis, TN (2014); Washington D.C. (2015); Tampa, FL (2016); Albuquerque, NM (2017); Quebec City, Quebec, Canada (2018); Austin, TX (2019); Minneapolis, MN (2022); Columbia, SC (2023); Tempe, AZ (2024); Omaha, NE (2025); Richmond, VA (2026). Field trips organized by the conference host committees include local and regional places of geographic and historical significance. An exhibit hall is staffed by government, industry, nonprofit, and academic organizations and offers the latest in books, journals, projects, curriculum, software, hardware, and more to support geography teaching. Each conference is highlighted by an annual keynote address.

Today, NCGE continues its mission in an evolving education landscape. It supports its members with regular communications about available resources, networking opportunities, geographic perspectives on world events, and more. NCGE organizes webinars and workshops featuring new teaching methods, geospatial and educational technologies, and content knowledge. Teachers of the AP Human Geography course get focused support through bell-ringer activities and other information sent out throughout the school year.

== Operations ==
NCGE is a non-profit corporation registered in Maryland. The national board of directors is elected by the membership and convenes monthly to provide guidance and oversight to the executive director. Meetings are currently held monthly with the use of online meeting software, and an annual board retreat happens in conjunction with the annual conference each year.

The NCGE works with other organizations at international, national, and state scales on joint publications, joint participation in conferences, and in research and curriculum development. These include the International Geographical Union, the Geographical Association, the American Association of Geographers, the National Council for the Social Studies, and other organizations. In addition to those organizations, NCGE members are active in the National Science Teachers Association, the North American Association for Environmental Education, and state social studies councils.

NCGE staff and membership produce materials that advance geography instruction and geography education research. NCGE members created the Geography Map, a body of skills and exemplary activities, as part of the Partnership for 21st Century Skills. As part of the Geography Education National Implementation Project (along with the National Geographic Society, American Association of Geographers, and American Geographical Society), NCGE contributed to the "Road Map for 21st Century Geography Education" project, funded by a National Science Foundation grant. This projected convened teams of scholars and leaders in the field and made recommendations in the areas of instructional materials and professional development, assessment, research, create key documents that define what geographic literacy is and why it is important to education and society.

NCGE holds a webinar series that is open to all and free to members. Topics include teaching with web-based Geographic Information Systems, geographic inquiry, place-based learning, field work techniques, methods of teaching Advanced Placement Human Geography (APHG), and more. These webinars are conducted by the experts in the respective topics and offer live training as well as the ability to watch the webinar recordings that have been archived. The GeoCircles series is designed to provide a space for hosted conversations among educators on topics of high interest.

=== National Geography Standards ===
During the 1990s, NCGE worked with the National Geographic Society, the American Association of Geographers, and the American Geographical Society to create national standards for what students at specific educational levels should know about geography by grades 4, 8, and 12. Entitled "Geography for Life" (1994, 2012), the publication enumerates 18 standards across six elements. This document supports a focus on teaching geography by clearly articulating what students need to learn to become geographically informed people, citizens, and workers. Academic vocabulary and benchmark knowledge and performance statements are included for grades 4, 8 and 12.

=== Publications ===
The NCGE's journals include the Journal of Geography and The Geography Teacher.

The Journal of Geography has been published since 1902 (by Taylor and Francis) and became the flagship journal of NCGE in 1920. It is a scholarly, peer-reviewed journal that serves as a vehicle for dissemination of original research and advancements in geographic education. The journal publishes commentaries, book reviews, and letters and is also a venue for symposia, or special themed issues.

Launched in 2000, The Geography Teacher aims to illustrate how geography can be taught in the classroom through short articles, lesson plans, teaching tips, and news especially relevant for primary, secondary, and pre-service teachers.

== Presidents ==
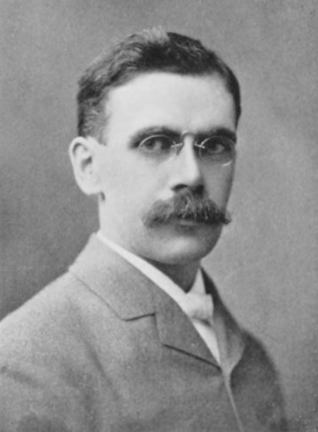
Richard Elwood Dodge, 1899

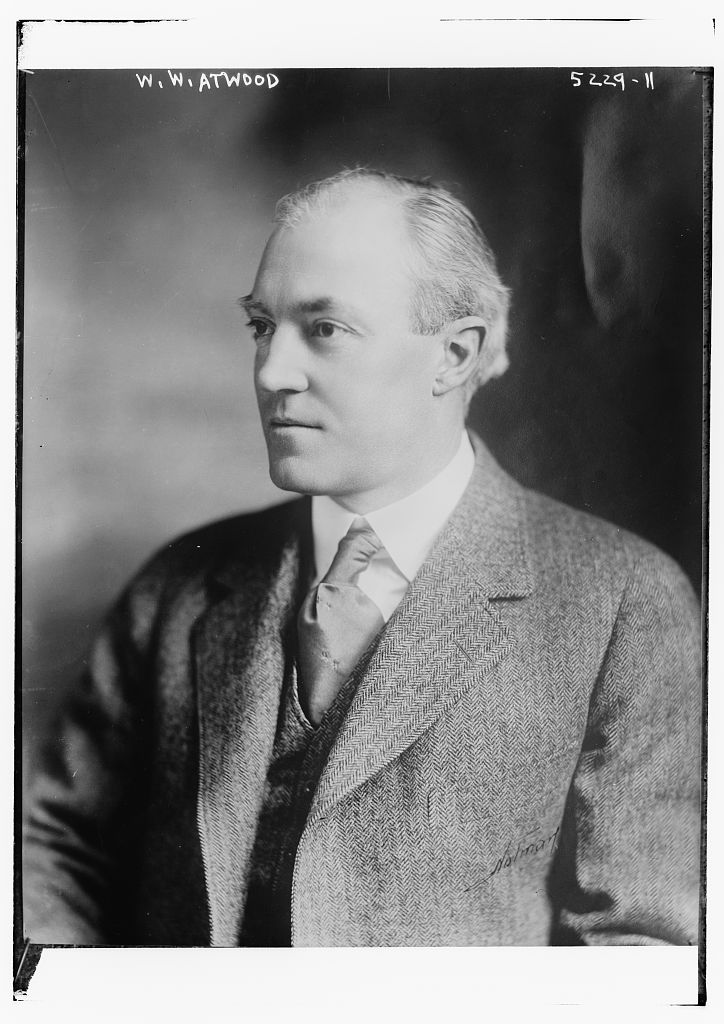
Wallace Walter Atwood, 1920

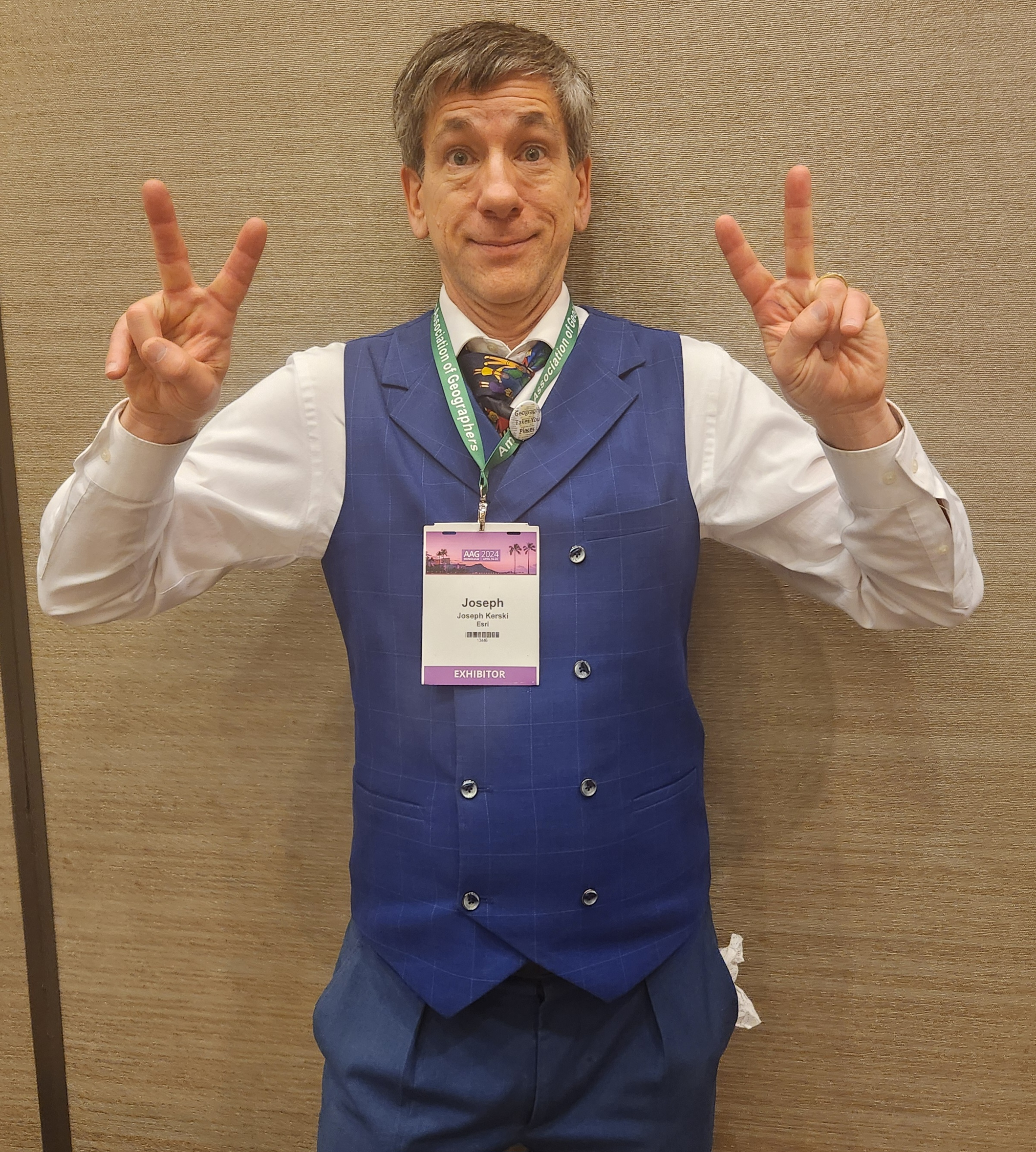
Joseph Kerski, 2024

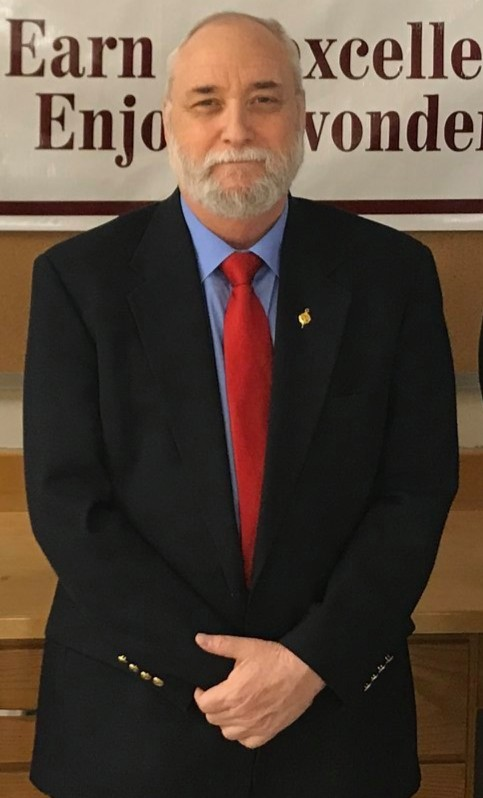
Michael DeMers, 2019

NCGE presidents include:

- Richard E. Dodge (1915–1917)
- Albert P. Brigham (1918–1919)
- Ray H. Whitbeck (1920)
- Wallace W. Atwood (1921)
- R.D. Calkins (1922)
- Robert M. Brown (1923)
- William R. McConnell (1924)
- Almon E. Parkins (1925)
- Erna Grassmuck (1926)
- Robert G. Buzzard (1927)
- Leonard O. Packard (1928)
- Nels A. Bentson (1929)
- DeForest Stull (1930)
- Douglas C. Ridgley (1931)
- Zoe A. Thralls (1932)
- George J Miller (1933)
- Edith P. Parker (1934)
- Clyde E. Cooper (1935)
- Alison E. Aitcheson (1936)
- Earl E. Lackey (1937)
- J. Russell Whitaker (1938)
- Edwin H. Reeder (1939)
- Cora P. Sletten (1940)
- Alice Foster (1941)
- Floyd E. Cunningham (1942–1944)
- C. Langdon White (1945)
- Katheryne T. Whittenmore (1946)
- Alfred H. Meyer (1947)
- Thomas F. Barton (1948)
- Earl B. Shaw (1949)
- Loyal Durand, Jr (1950)
- Harry O. Lathrop (1951)
- Clyde F. Kohn (1952)
- Henry J. Warman (1953)
- Otis W. Freeman (1954)
- M. Melvina Svec (1955)
- Norman J. Carls (1956)
- Ina C. Robertson (1957)
- Mary V. Phillips (1958)
- Adelbert K. Botts (1959)
- John W. Morris (1960)
- Jewell A. Phelps (1961)
- Mamie L. Anderzohn (1962)
- Sidney E. Ekblaw (1963)
- Herbert H. Gross (1964)
- Neville V. Scarfe (1965)
- Phillip Bacon (1966)
- Lorrin Kennamer (1967)
- Daniel Jacobson (1968)
- Benjamin F. Richason, Jr. (1969)
- William D. Pattison (1970)
- Robert A. Harper (1971)
- Paul F. Griffin (1972)
- John M. Ball (1973)
- Robert E. Gabler (1974)
- Elizabeth Eiselen (1975)
- Herbert A. Augustine (1976)
- William H. Wake (1977)
- Karl A. Robert (1978)
- Peter V. Greco (1978)
- John F. Lounsbury (1980)
- James M. Goodman (1981)
- Gary A. Manson (1982)
- Richard G. Boehm (1983)
- Walter G. Kemball (1984)
- Gail S. Ludwig (1985)
- Charles F. Gritzner (1986)
- J.B. Kracht / A.R. Longwell (1987)
- A. Richard Longwell (1988)
- Robert W. Morrill (1989)
- Dorothy W. Drummond (1990)
- Norman C. Bettis (1991)
- Michael J. Libbee (1992)
- Douglas A. Phillips (1993)
- M. Duane Nellis (1994)
- Edward A. Fernald (1995)
- James F. Marran (1996)
- Donald J. Ziegler (1997)
- David A. Lanegran (1998)
- Gail A. Hobbs (1999)
- James F. Petersen (2000)
- Robert S. Bednarz (2001)
- Jody Smothers-Marcello (2002)
- Susan W. Hardwick (2003)
- Gwenda H. Rice (2004)
- Martha B. Sharma (2005)
- Kenneth E. Foote (2006)
- Mark H. Bockenhauer (2007)
- Janet Smith (2008)
- Joseph Stoltman (2009)
- Kristin Alvarez (2010)
- Joseph Kerski (2011)
- Eric J. Fournier (2012)
- Paul T. Gray Jr. (2013)
- Michael N. DeMers (2014)
- Susan Hume (2015)
- Ellen Foster (2016)
- Gary Gress (2017)
- Audrey Mohan (2018)
- Kenneth H. Keller (2019)
- Jerry Mitchell (2020)
- Jeff Lash (2021)
- Larianne Collins (2022)
- Greg Hill (2023)
- Thomas Larsen (2024)
- Phillip Hare (2025)
- Celeste Reynolds (2026)
- John "Scott" Greene (2027)
