= Richard E. Dodge =

American geographer

Richard Elwood Dodge
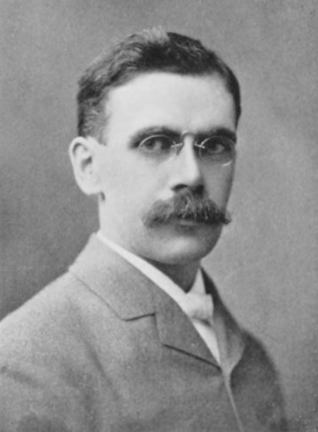
- Portrait of Richard Elwood Dodge from Universities and Their Sons, Volume III, 1899, page 383
- Born: 30 March 1868; Wenham, Massachusetts
- Died: 2 April 1952 (aged 84)
- Education: Yale, Harvard
- Occupation: Geographer

Richard Elwood Dodge ( March 30, 1868 - April 2, 1952) was an American geographer, first president of the National Council for Geographic Education, and eleventh president of the American Association of Geographers.

== Education ==
Dodge graduated from Salem High School. He obtained a bachlors degree in 1890 and a Master of Arts in 1894, both from Harvard. Dodge later obtained his Ph.D. from Yale. While in graduate school, Dodge studied under William Morris Davis and developed an interest in physiography.

== Career ==
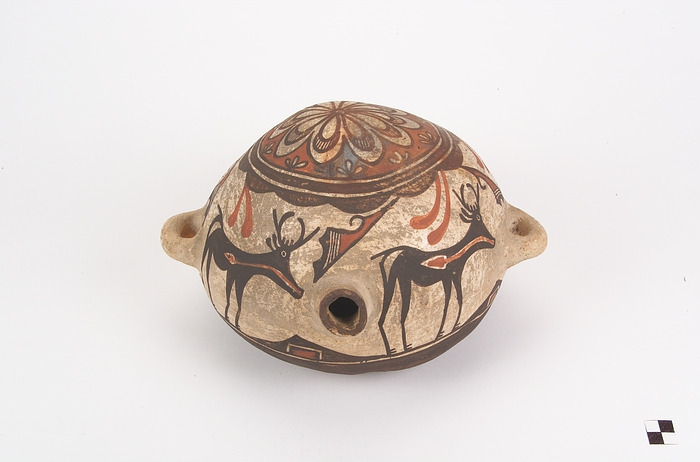
Zuni Canteen collected in 1898 by Dodge during the Hyde Exploring Expedition

Dodge's early career was shaped by the professors he worked under in graduate school, and he was initially interested primarily in geology. Between 1891 and 1894, he was the teaching assistant for Nathaniel Shaler's geology course, and then appointed instructor of geology in 1894. Dodge worked with the United States Geological Survey, participating in the Transcontinental Excursion of 1891, and worked as an assistant for Charles Willard Hayes during the summers of 1894 and 1895. This experience led Dodge to focus more on geography than on geology. In 1898, Dodge participated in the Hyde Exploring Expedition. Dodge also participated in an expedition to Turkestan led by William Morris Davis, and traveled throughout Eurasia, detailing archeological sites and geography during these travels.

Dodge was the first professor of geography at a United States teacher-training institution as the first geography professor at Teachers College, Columbia University. This position caused Dodge to shift his focus away from geology to geography. In addition to his teaching duties at the Teachers College, Dodge participated in administrative duties.

Dodge established the Journal of School Geography, in 1897 which later became the Journal of Geography after being combined with the Bulletin of the American Bureau of Geography. Dodge was the first editor of the Annals of the Association of American Geographers when it was created in 1911, and maintained the position until 1923, taking one year off when he served as the organization's president in 1915.

Dodge was heavily involved with the Association of American Geographers. In addition to his role as editor of the Annals, Dodge served on the AAG council for 15 years. Between 1915 and 1916, he served as the organization's president. Following his term as president, Dodge worked as the organization's secretary for five years and was involved in several of the organization's committees.

In 1914, efforts began to establish the National Council of Geography Teachers, and in 1915 the organization was formalized. Dodge served as the first president of this organization.

Between 1918 and 1938, Dodge was a professor at Connecticut State College at Storrs (now the University of Connecticut), and between 1920 and 1930, he served as the administrative dean of the geography program.

== Publications and research ==
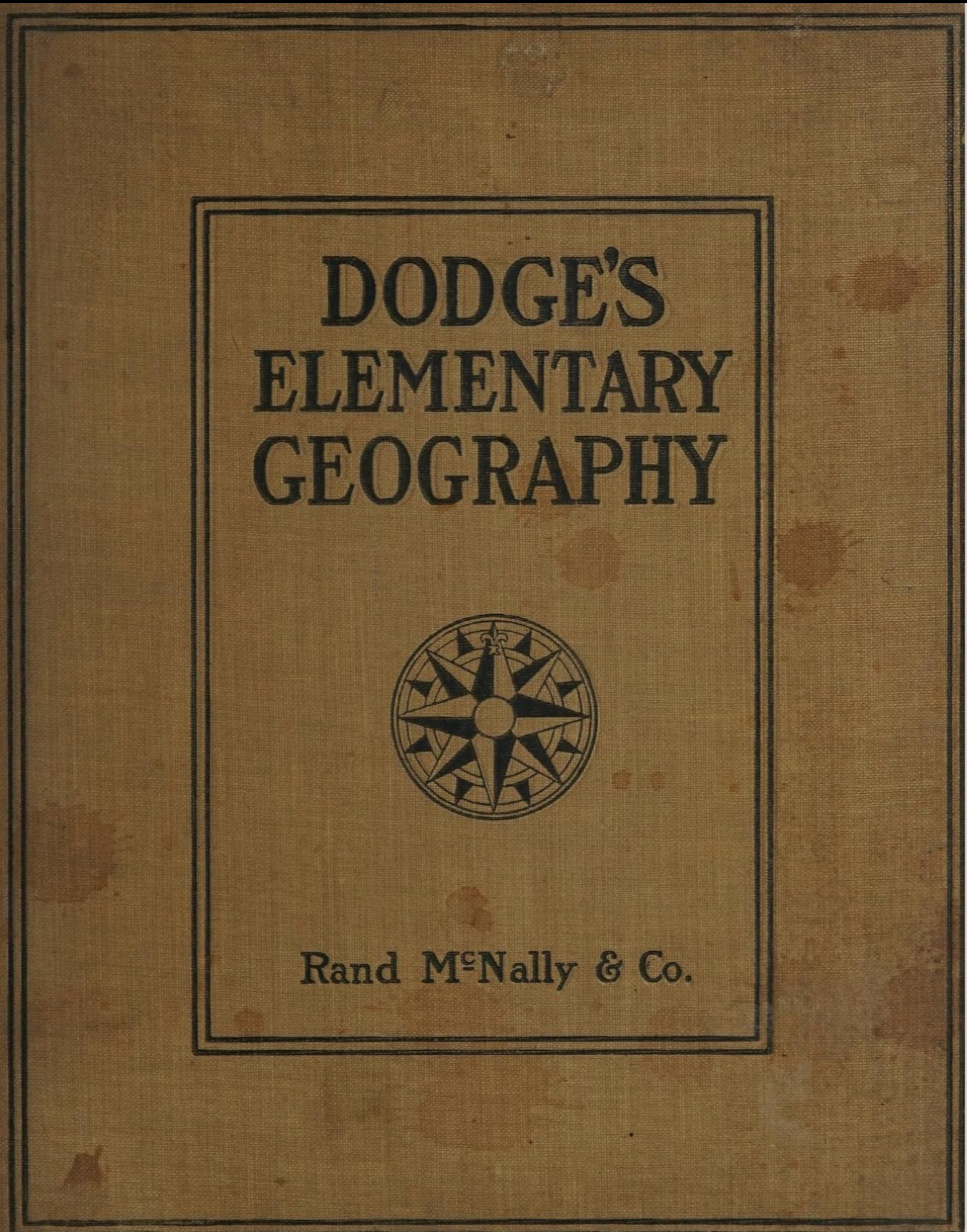
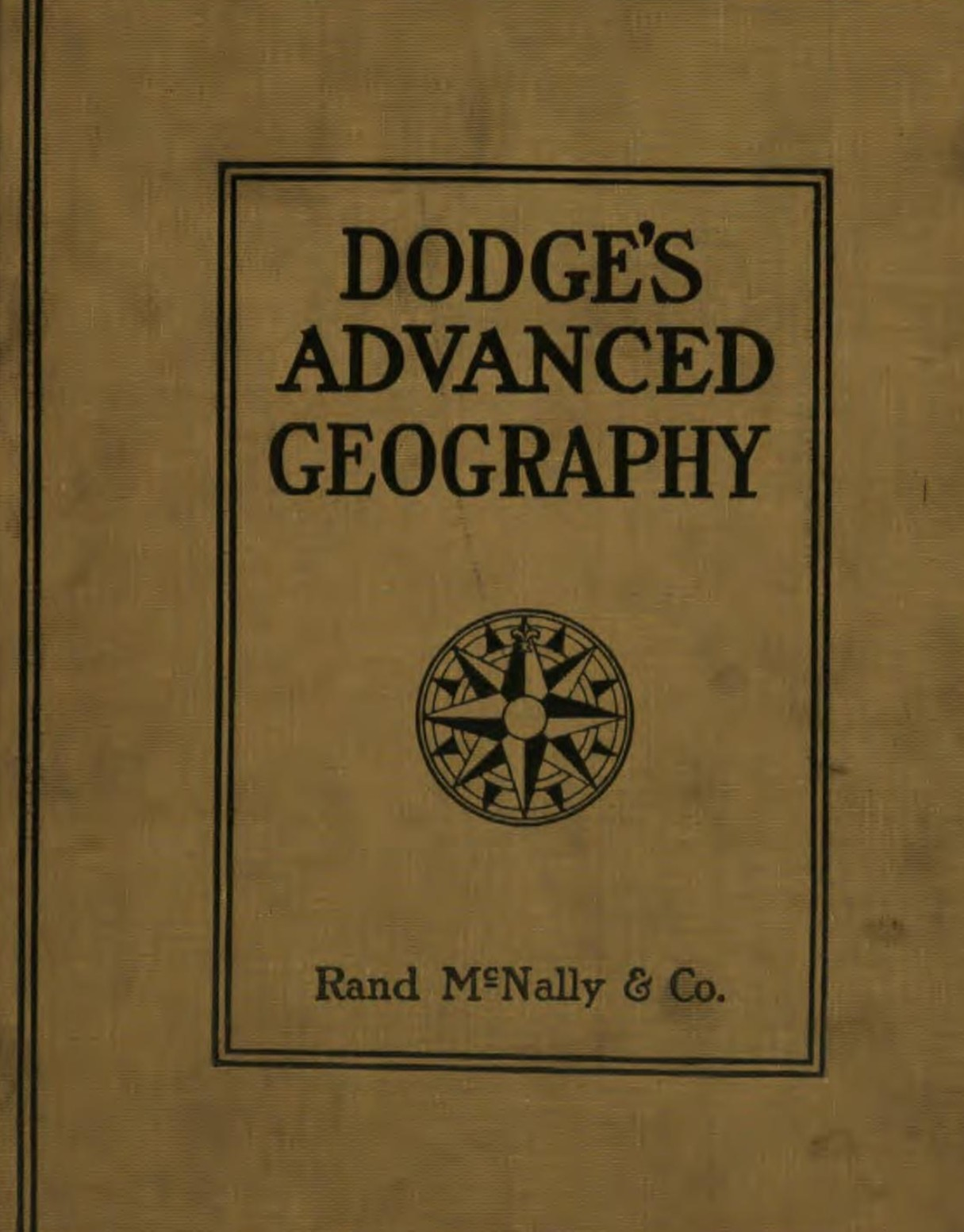
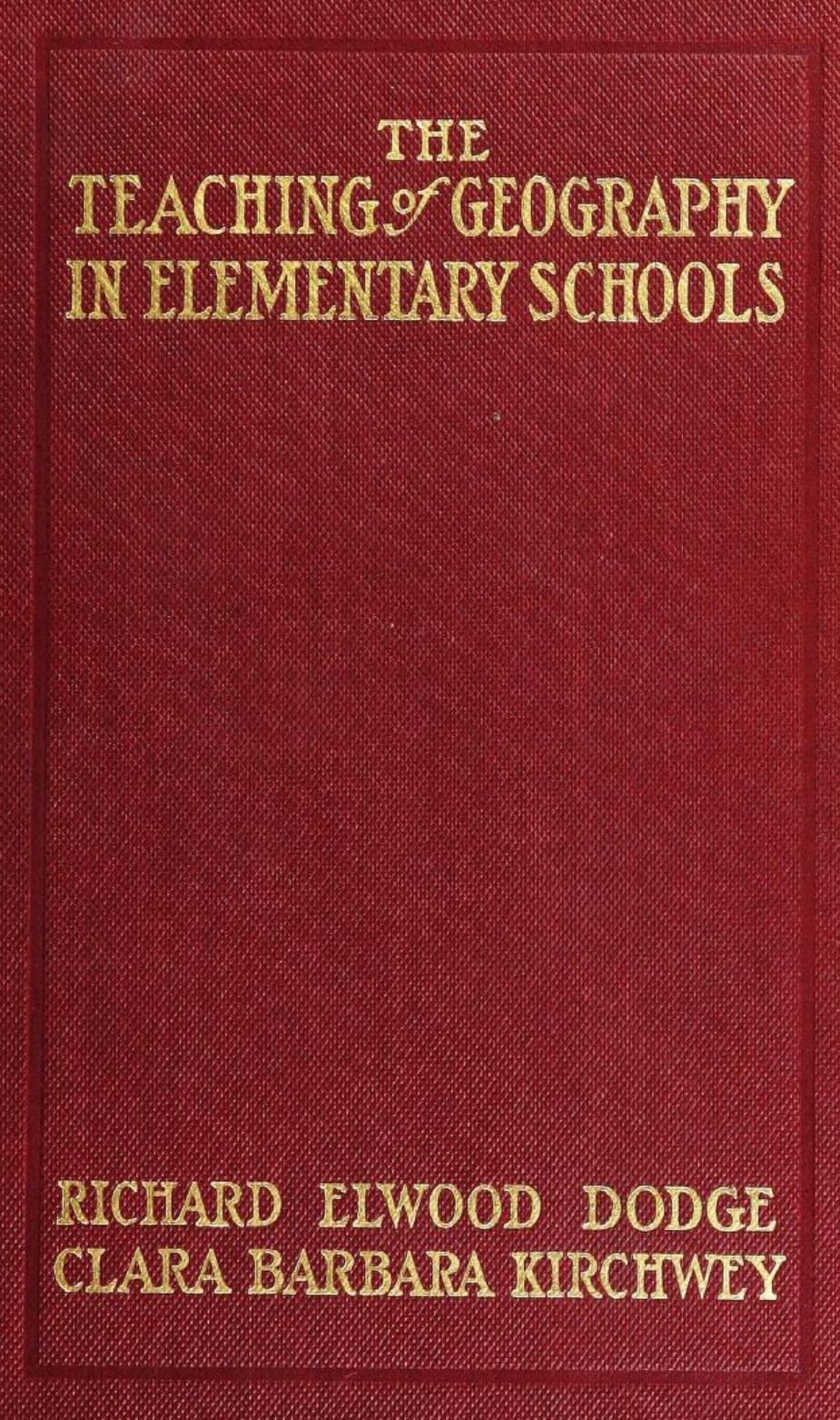
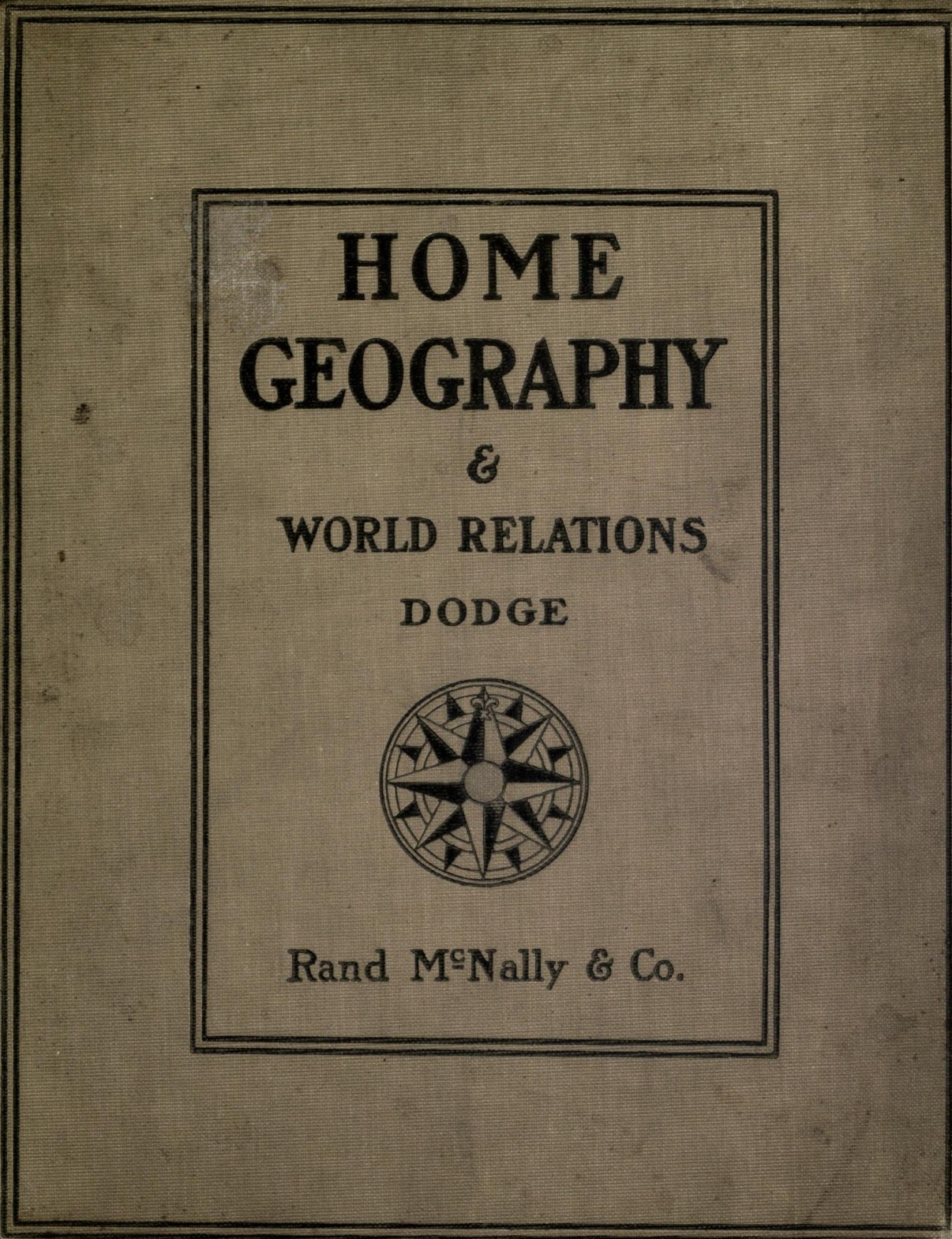
Several of the books published by Dodge.

=== Books ===
Dodge is notable for publishing several influential geography textbooks that advanced the discipline in the United States. Publishing these textbooks is regarded as having been a higher priority for him than his teaching duties or personal research, with his neglect for the department cited as creating a culture that ultimately led to the closure of the geography department at Columbia University. Dodge authored or co-authored seven books, including Dodge Geographies, Teaching of Geography in Elementary Schools (with Clara B. Kirchwey), Foundations of Geography (with Stanley D. Dodge), and Economic Geography (with W. Harrison Carter Jr.).

=== Articles ===
Dodge's earliest publications were focused on geology, while his later research mostly focused on geography education. His work was influential in shaping how American geography is taught.

List of Dodge's publications
Title	Date	Publisher	Identifier	Citation(s)
Some Problems of Geographic Education in the United States	1916	Annals of the American Association of Geographers	doi:10.1080/00045601609357046	
The Interpretation of Sequent Occupance	1938	Annals of the American Association of Geographers	doi:10.1080/00045603809357182	
Approaching Boston	1903	Journal of Geography	doi:10.1080/00221340308985959	
The Opportunity of the Geographer in Promoting School Geography	1906	Journal of Geography	doi:10.1080/00221340608986147	
Geography for Secondary Schools	1908	Journal of Geography	doi:10.1080/00221340808986211	
Some Suggestions Concerning a Course of Study in Geography	1908	Journal of Geography	doi:10.1080/00221340808985359	
Geography in Rural Schools	1910	Journal of Geography	doi:10.1080/00221341008986226	
Man and His Geographic Environment	1910	Journal of Geography	doi:10.1080/00221341008985445	
The Grand Coulee, Washington	1913	Journal of Geography	doi:10.1080/00221341308985841	
The Modern Point of View in Geography Teaching	1914	Journal of Geography	doi:10.1080/00221341408985021	
The Purposes of Geography Teaching	1914	Journal of Geography	doi:10.1080/00221341408983917	
The Teaching of Physical Geography in Elementary Schools	1900	National Geographic		
Continental Phenomena Illustrated by Ripple Marks	1894	Science	doi:10.1126/science.ns-23.572.38	
Scientific Geography for Schools	1898	The Geographical Journal	doi:10.2307/1774436	
Additional Species of Pleistocene Fossils From Winthrop, Massachusetts	1894	American Journal of Science	doi:10.2307/1774436	

== Awards and recognition ==
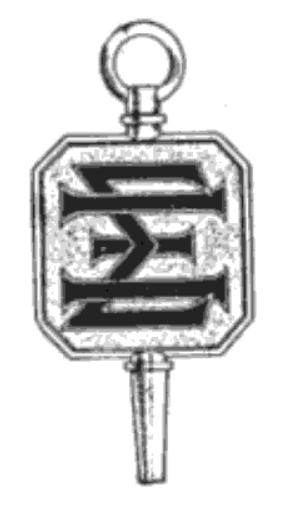
Sigma Xi badge

Dodge was included in the first edition of American Men of Science as a geologist. In 1917, Dodge became the first teaching faculty member to give the commencement speech for the Connecticut Agricultural College, titled Looking Ahead in Agriculture: A Vision of Our Opportunities and Responsibilities as Farmers. Dodge received the National Council of Geography Teachers' Distinguished Service to Geography Award in 1946 for "his contributions to geography in education and in recognition of his many personal and intellectual qualities the National Council of Geography Teachers." He was a member of the Sigma Xi honor society, and a fellow of the New York Academy of Science, Geological Society of America and the American Association for the Advancement of Science.

== Personal life ==
Dodge was the seventh man in his family to be named Richard Dodge. He was married in 1896 and had a daughter and two sons. Dodge was a 32° Mason, and active in his lodge.

== See also ==
- Gamma Theta Upsilon – International geography honor society
- Marilyn Raphael – Trinidadian climatologist
- Rebecca Lave – American critical physical geographer
- Waldo Tobler – American geographer
- Yi-Fu Tuan – Chinese-American geographer (1930–2022)
