= William G. Moseley =

American geographer

William G. Moseley (born 1965) is an American geographer. He works as DeWitt Wallace Professor of Geography at Macalester College, where he directs the Food, Agriculture, and Society program. He has also previously served as the president of the American Association of Geographers (AAG) and president of the Mande Studies Association (MANSA). His research and teaching interests include tropical agriculture, political ecology, and development geography.

== Background ==
Moseley was born in 1965. He graduated from Carleton College in 1987 with a B.A. degree in history before working with the Peace Corps in Ouelessebougou, Mali, from 1987 to 1989. He then went to the University of Michigan until 1993, where he attended the Ford School of Public Policy for his M.P.P. degree and the School of Natural Resources and Environment for an M.S. in environmental policy. For the next four years, he worked for Save the Children Fund in the issue area of food security.

Following his career in development, in 2001, Moseley received a Ph.D. in geography from the University of Georgia with a dissertation entitled Sahelian 'White Gold' and Rural Poverty-Environment Interactions: The Political Ecology of Cotton Production, Environmental Change, and Household Food Economy in Mali.

== Career ==
Moseley was an assistant professor at Northern Illinois University from 2001 to 2002 before being named assistant professor at Macalester College in Saint Paul, Minnesota. He was an associate professor from 2007 to 2011, professor from 2011 to 2019, and was named to his endowed professorship in 2020. Moseley also directs the Food, Agriculture and Society program at Macalester.

In 2013, the American Association of Geographers awarded Moseley their Media Achievement Award. In 2016, the Africa specialty group of the AAG awarded him the Kwadwo Konadu-Agyemang Distinguished Scholar Award. From 2019 to 2023, Moseley served on the steering committee of the High Level Panel of Experts on Food Security and Nutrition for the Committee on World Food Security, one of 15 recognized international experts.

He served as vice president, president and past president of the Mande Studies Association from 2021 to 2028 and vice president, president and past president of the American Association of Geographers (AAG) from 2025-2027. He is the first AAG president from a non-R1 liberal arts college (rather than a research university). Beginning his term at the AAG, Moseley said that "the policy-making world in the Anglo-American context is dominated by political scientists and economists. ... Geography has a different angle to offer on issues. We need to speak up ..." He is also an affiliate faculty member in the Department of Geography, Environment, and Society at the University of Minnesota.

== Research ==
Moseley is a development and human-environment geographer with particular expertise in political ecology and tropical agriculture in Sub-Saharan Africa. He is the author of 12 books and over 70 refereed research articles, as well as numerous op-eds in popular media such as The Conversation. He was previously an opinion contributor for Al Jazeera English, and he served as editor of the African Geographical Review from 2008 to 2010.

=== Selected books ===
- Moseley, William G. (2024). Decolonizing African Agriculture: Food Security, Agroecology and the Need for Radical Transformation. Agenda Publishing. ISBN 9781788215893.
- Fouberg, Erin H.; Moseley, William G. (2017). Understanding World Regional Geography (2nd ed.). Wiley. ISBN 9781119393900.
- Moseley, William G.; Schnurr, Matthew A.; Bezner-Kerr, Rachel (2016). Africa’s Green Revolution: Critical Perspectives on New Agricultural Technologies and Systems. Routledge. ISBN 9781138185951.
- McCusker, Brent; Moseley, William G.; Ramutsindela, Maano (2015). Land Reform in South Africa: An Uneven Transformation. Rowman & Littlefield. ISBN 9781442207165.
- Moseley, William G.; Perramond, Eric; Hapke, Holly M.; Laris, Paul (2013). An Introduction to Human-Environment Geography: Local Dynamics and Global Processes. Wiley. ISBN 9781405189316.
