= American Association of Geographers =

American professional academic organization

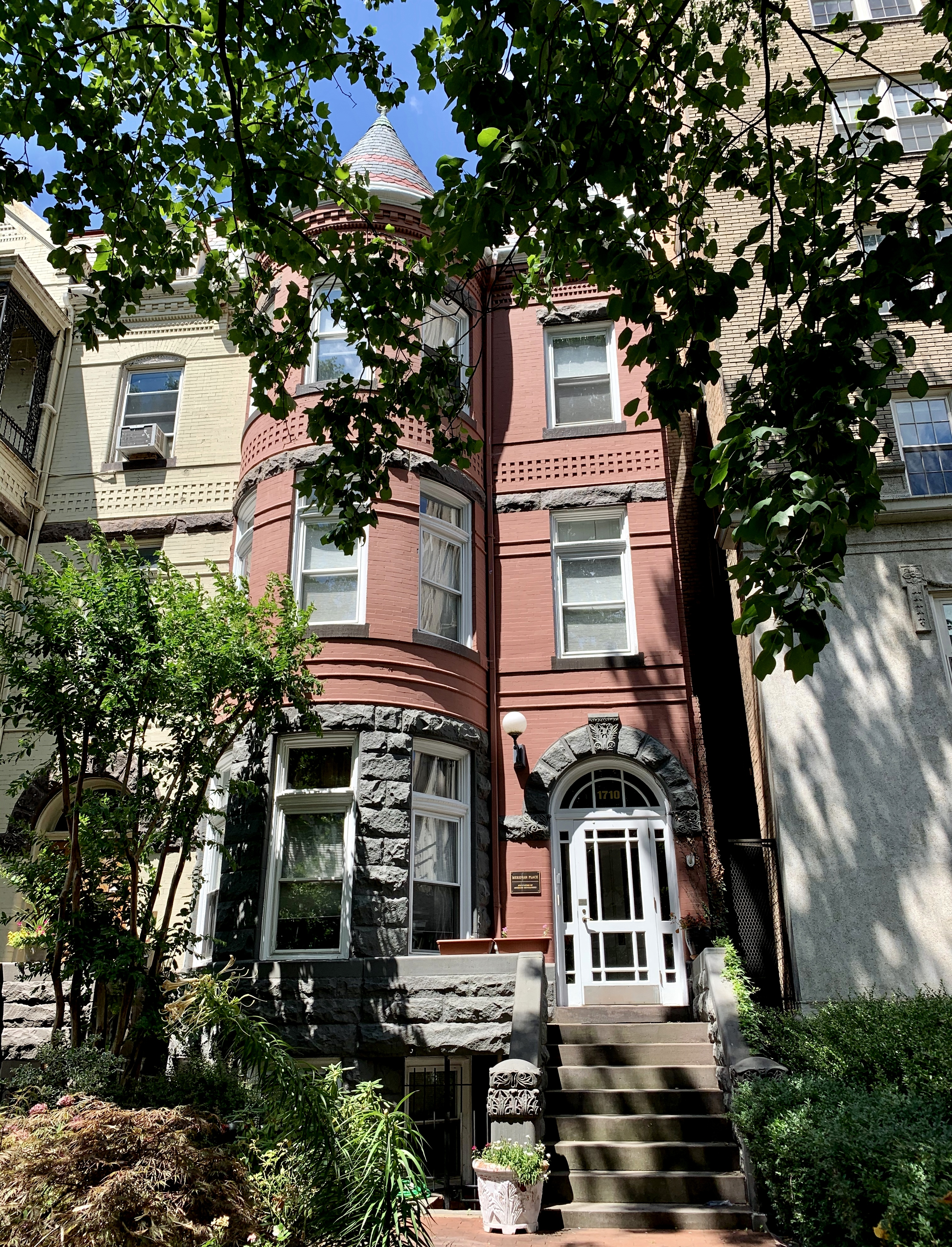
- AAG former headquarters on 16th Street (along a global meridian) in Washington, D.C. AAG is now on Pennsylvania Avenue.
- Formation: December 29, 1904; 121 years ago
- Founded at: Philadelphia, Pennsylvania
- Type: Nonprofit
- Headquarters: Washington, D.C., United States
- Members: 10,000 (2020)
- President: Sara Smith
- Executive Director: Gary Langham
- Website: www.aag.org
- Formerly called: Association of American Geographers

The American Association of Geographers (AAG) is a non-profit scientific and educational society aimed at advancing the understanding, study, and importance of geography and related fields. Its headquarters is located in Washington, D.C. The organization was founded on December 29, 1904, in Philadelphia, as the Association of American Geographers, with the American Society of Professional Geographers later amalgamating into it in December 1948 in Madison, Wisconsin. As of 2020, the association has more than 10,000 members, from nearly 100 countries. AAG members are geographers and related professionals who work in the public, private, and academic sectors.

In 2016, AAG president Dr. Sarah Witham Bednarz announced in the AAG Newsletter: "Effective January 1, 2016, the AAG will begin to operate under the name "American Association of Geographers", rather than "Association of American Geographers... in an effort to re-think our systems of representation to acknowledge our growing internationalism." Spearheaded under the presidency of geography professor Eric Sheppard, the name change reflects the US-based organization's diversity and inclusion of non-American members and participants.

== Publications ==
The Annals of the American Association of Geographers and The Professional Geographer are the association's flagship journals. Additional journals published by the organization include the AAG Review of Books, GeoHumanities, and African Geographical Review. The AAG also publishes a monthly newsletter that contains reflections on programs and issues of concern in society of a geographic nature, a jobs column, and accomplishments and innovations of AAG members. The AAG additionally publishes the Guide to Geography Programs in the Americas, a description of programs in higher education in North and South America that offer a geography degree, a geography certificate program, and/or geography courses. Another publication is Earth Interactions.

== Specialty groups ==
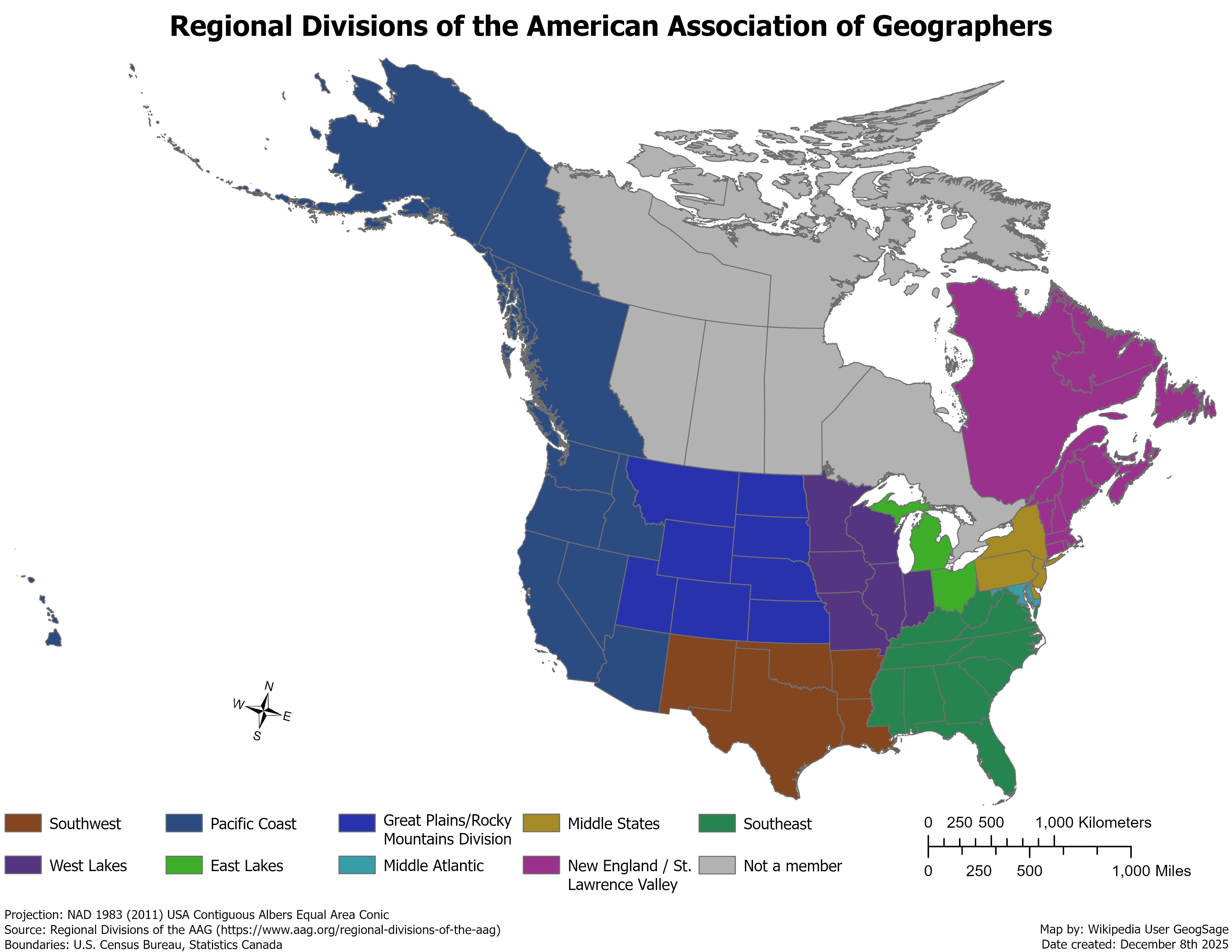
Regional divisions of the American Association of Geographers

The AAG has more than 80 specialty or affinity groups, voluntary associations of AAG members who share interests in regions or topics. Specialty groups have long provided a way for geographers with specific interests to collaborate and communicate, including organizing and sponsoring sessions at the annual meeting as well as granting awards to their members. The AAG also offers Knowledge Communities, a set of online tools for collaboration.

== Annual meetings ==
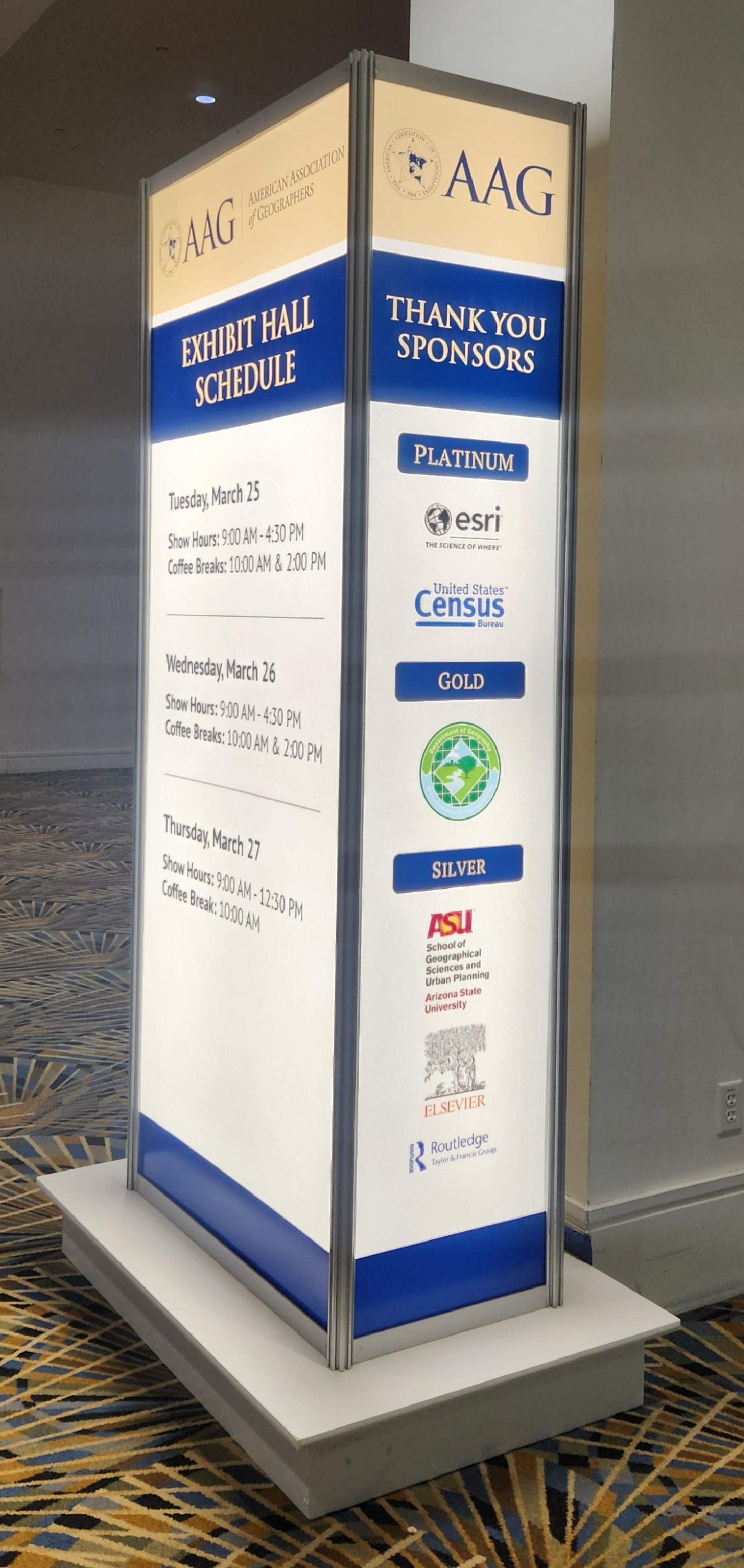
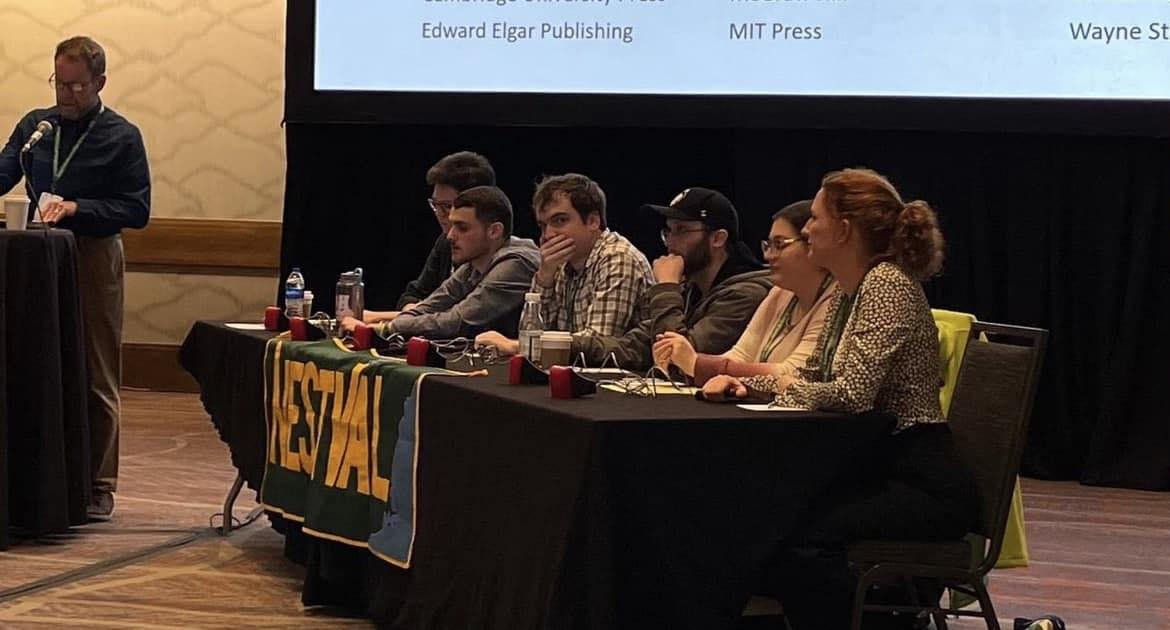
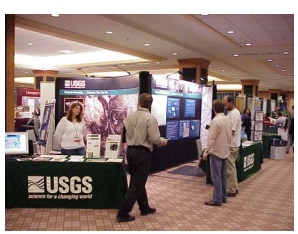
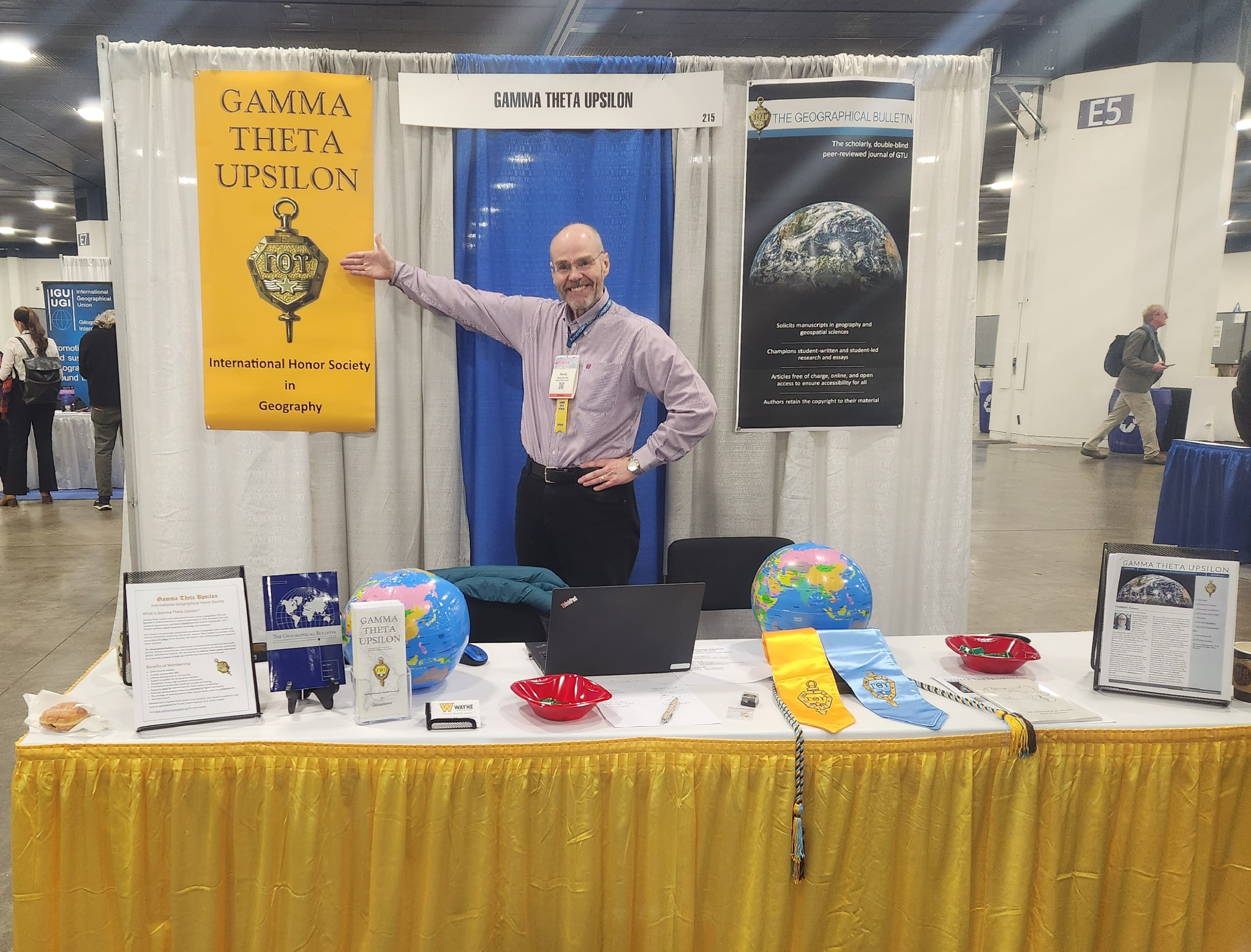
Top left:Exhibit Hall Sign at the 2025 AAG annual meeting illustrating a few of the partnerships that AAG has. Top right:NESTVAL World Geography bowl team at the 2024. Bottom left: Exhibit hall at the AAG Annual Meetings. Bottom right: The Gamma Theta Upsilon booth at the 2025 AAG annual conference in Detroit Michigan.

Since its founding in 1904, the AAG has held an annual meeting for the geography community. In recent years, this conference has attracted between 7,000 and 9,000 attendees. The annual meeting offers upwards of 4,000 papers and presentations on topics as diverse as soil moisture, climate change, population dynamics, political instability, sustainable agriculture, natural hazards, urban landscapes, geography and militarism, and technologies such as geographic information systems. Hands-on workshops on methods and technological tools are an important part of these meetings. The annual meetings also offer an extensive exhibit hall featuring publishers, technology companies, universities, businesses, and nonprofit organizations. Field trips are offered in the diverse locations that these conferences are held. Since the early 1990s, the AAG has hosted the "World Geography Bowl" at the annual meeting, a quiz bowl style tournament in which teams of students from the various regional divisions compete.

The annual meetings are held in February, March, or April each year for four to five days. The most recent meeting was held in Detroit, Michigan between March 24–28, 2025, while the forthcoming meeting for next year will take place in San Francisco, California, between March 17–21, 2026, the annual meeting for 2024 was held in Honolulu, Hawaii from April 16–20, 2024. The 2023 meeting was held in Denver . During the COVID-19 pandemic, the meetings were held virtually (2020, 2021, and 2022). Prior to the shift online, the annual meetings were held in person in Washington D.C. (2019), New Orleans (2018), Boston (2017), San Francisco (2016), Chicago (2015), Tampa (2014), Los Angeles (2013), New York (2012), and Seattle (2011).

The AAG also sponsors fall meetings based within each regional divisions of the organization. These regional divisions are groupings of several states in the United States, and include, Pacific Coast, Great Plains/Rocky Mountains, Southwest, West Lakes, East Lakes, Southeast, Mid-Atlantic, Middle States, and New England/St. Lawrence Valley.

== Partnerships ==
To effectively advance geography in society requires partnerships. The AAG has a long history of fruitful partnerships with government agencies, nonprofit organizations, and private industry. These include the National Council for Geographic Education, the United States Geological Survey, the National Institutes of Health, the American Geosciences Institute and others.

== Awards ==
=== Applied Geography Specialty Group James R. Anderson Medal of Honor ===
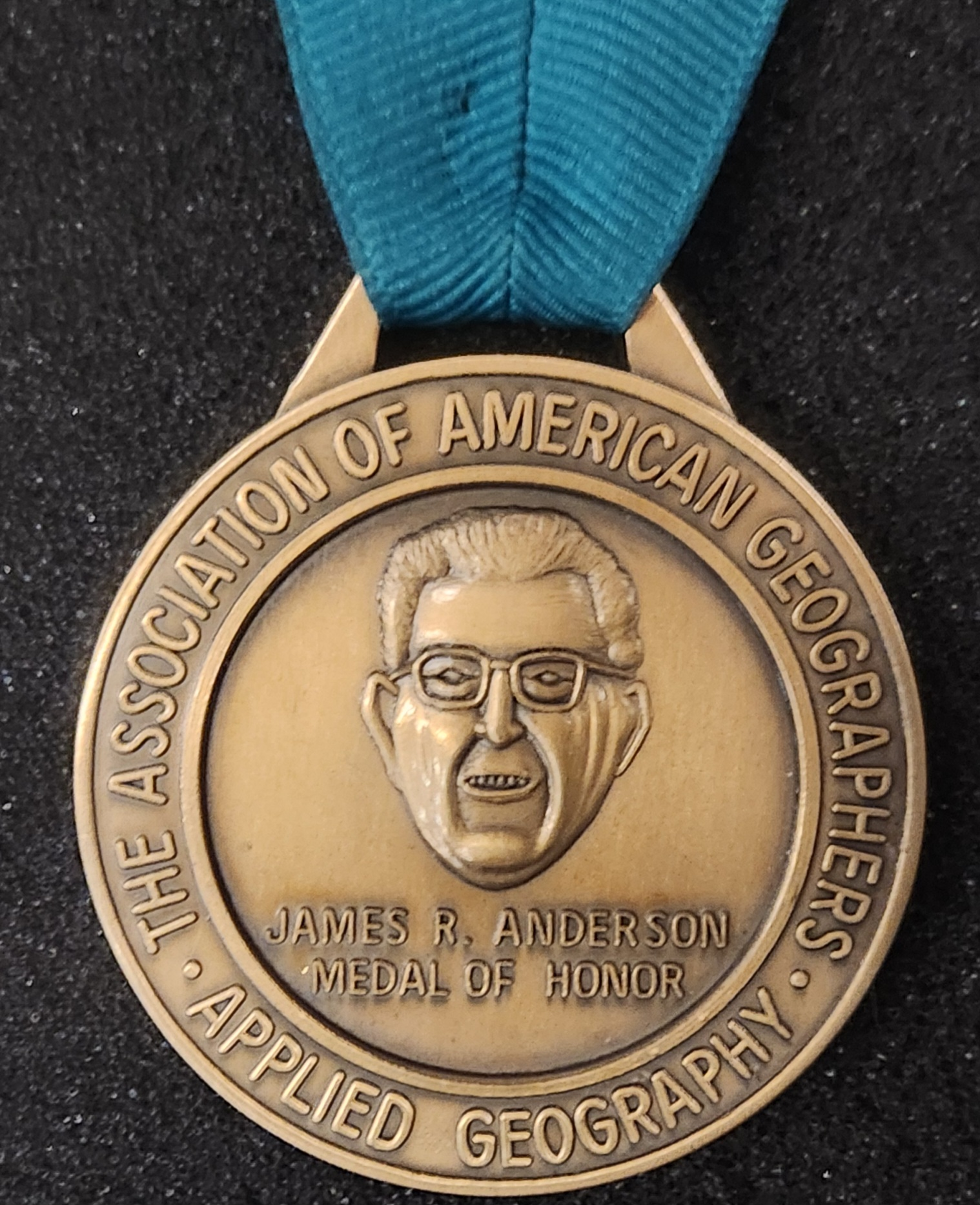
Anderson Medal of Honor in Applied Geography awarded to Geographer Harvey Miller in 2025

The James R. Anderson Medal of Honor (the Anderson Medal) is awarded by the AAG Applied Geography Specialty Group to recognise highly distinguished service to the profession of geography in the field of industry, government, literature, education, research, service to the profession, or public service. It is named for James R. Anderson, the third chief geographer of the U.S. Geological Survey. Winners of the Anderson Medal include:

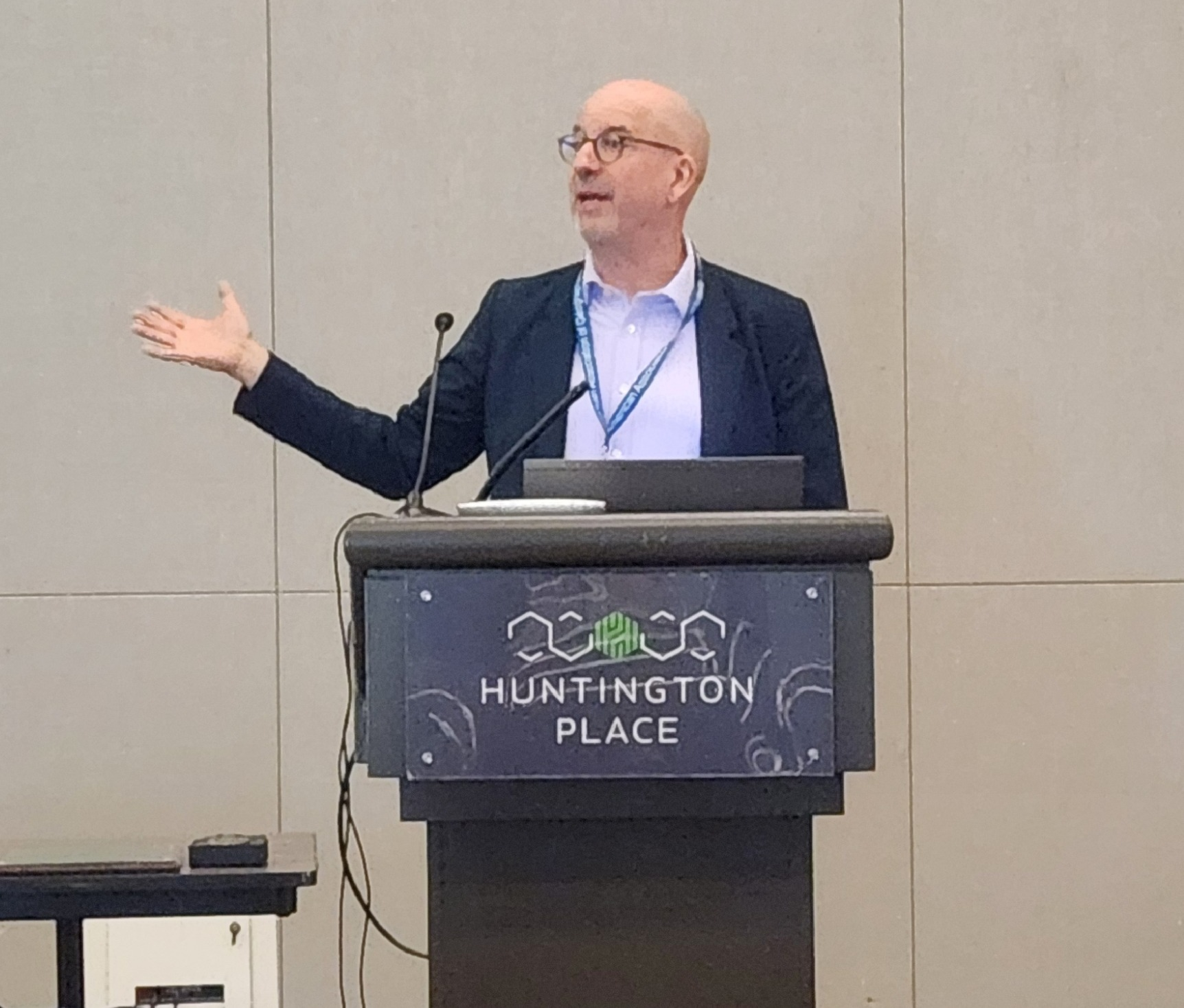
Harvey Miller

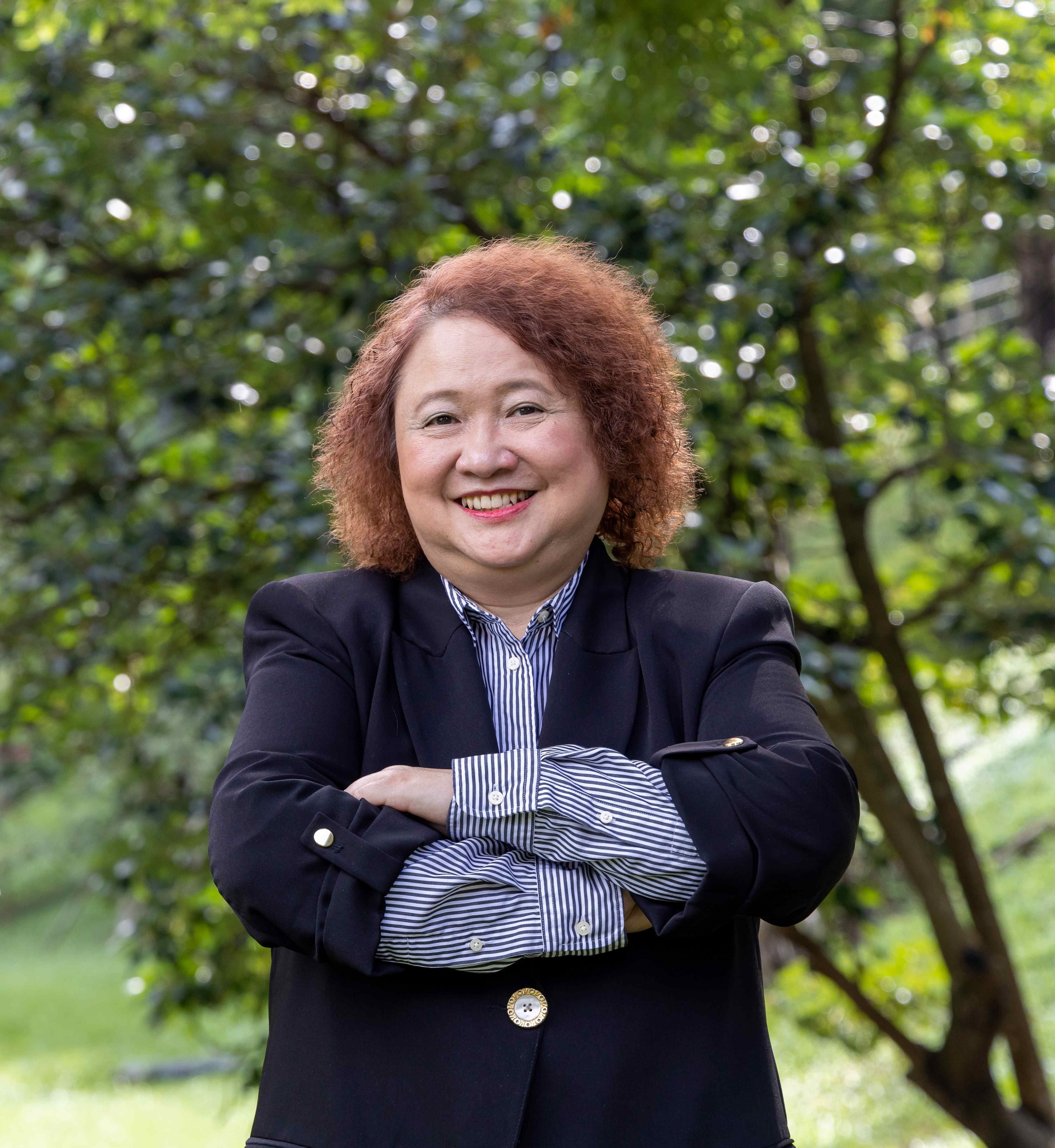
Mei-Po Kwan

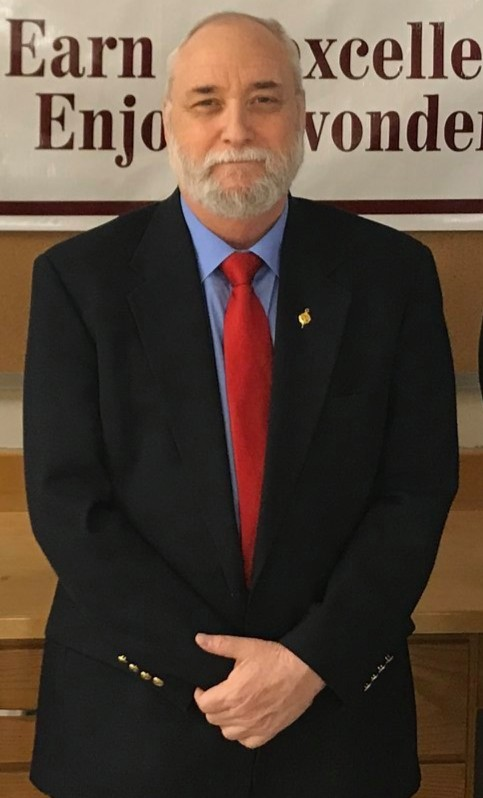
Michael DeMers

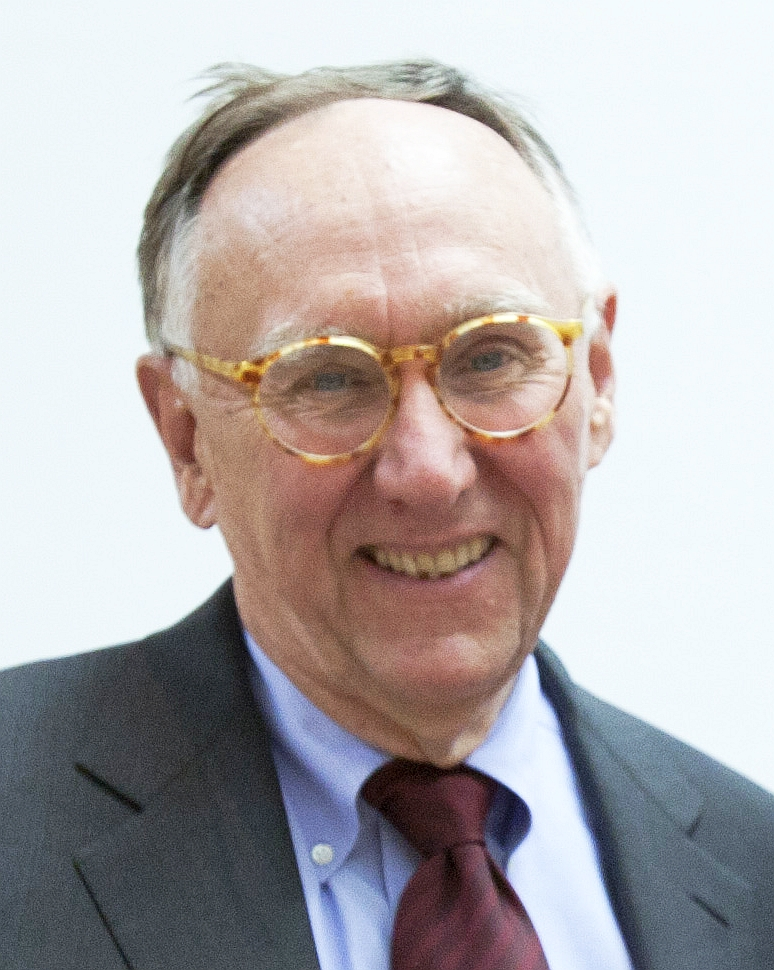
Jack Dangermond

Anderson Medal of Honor Winners
- Harvey Miller (2025)
- Gary Molyneaux (2023)
- Mei-Po Kwan (2022)
- Budhendra "Budhu" Badhuri (2018)
- William Derrenbacher (2015)
- Jerome E. "Jerry" Dobson (2014)
- Jeffrey Osleeb (2013)
- Lee R. Schwartz (2012)
- Robert B. Honea (2011)
- Michael DeMers (2010)
- Michael Sutcliffe (2007)
- Marilyn A. Brown (2004)
- Barry Wellar (2003)
- Richard D. Wright (2002)
- William B. Wood (2001)
- Kingsley E. Haynes (2000)
- Joel R. Morrison (1999)
- Jack Dangermond (1998)
- Frank H. Thomas (1997)
- John W. Frazier (1996)
- Roger Tomlinson (1995)
- Thomas J. Wilbanks (1995)
- William L. Garrison (1994)
- Lay J. Gibson (1993)
- Edward A. Fernald (1992)
- Harold M. Mayer (1991)
- Howard L. Green (1990)
- T. R. Lakshmanan (1989)
- David L. Huff (1988)
- Brian Berry (1987)
- Gilbert F. White (1986)
- Bart J. Epstein (1985)
- Evelyn L. Pruitt (1984)
- Joseph A Russell (1983)

=== Geographic Information Science and Systems Specialty Group Tobler Lecture Award ===
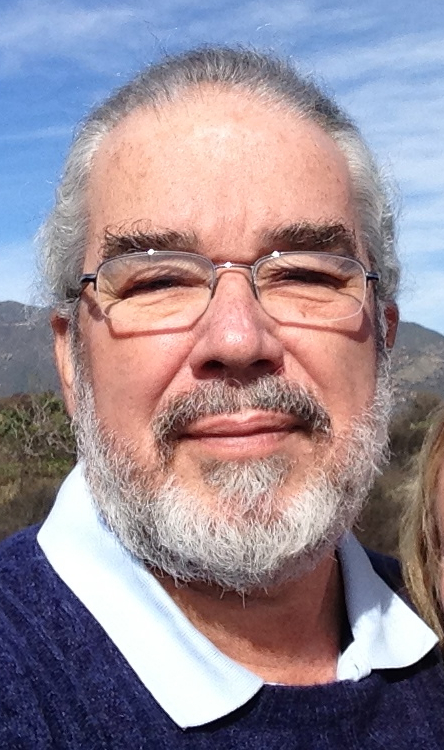
David M. Mark

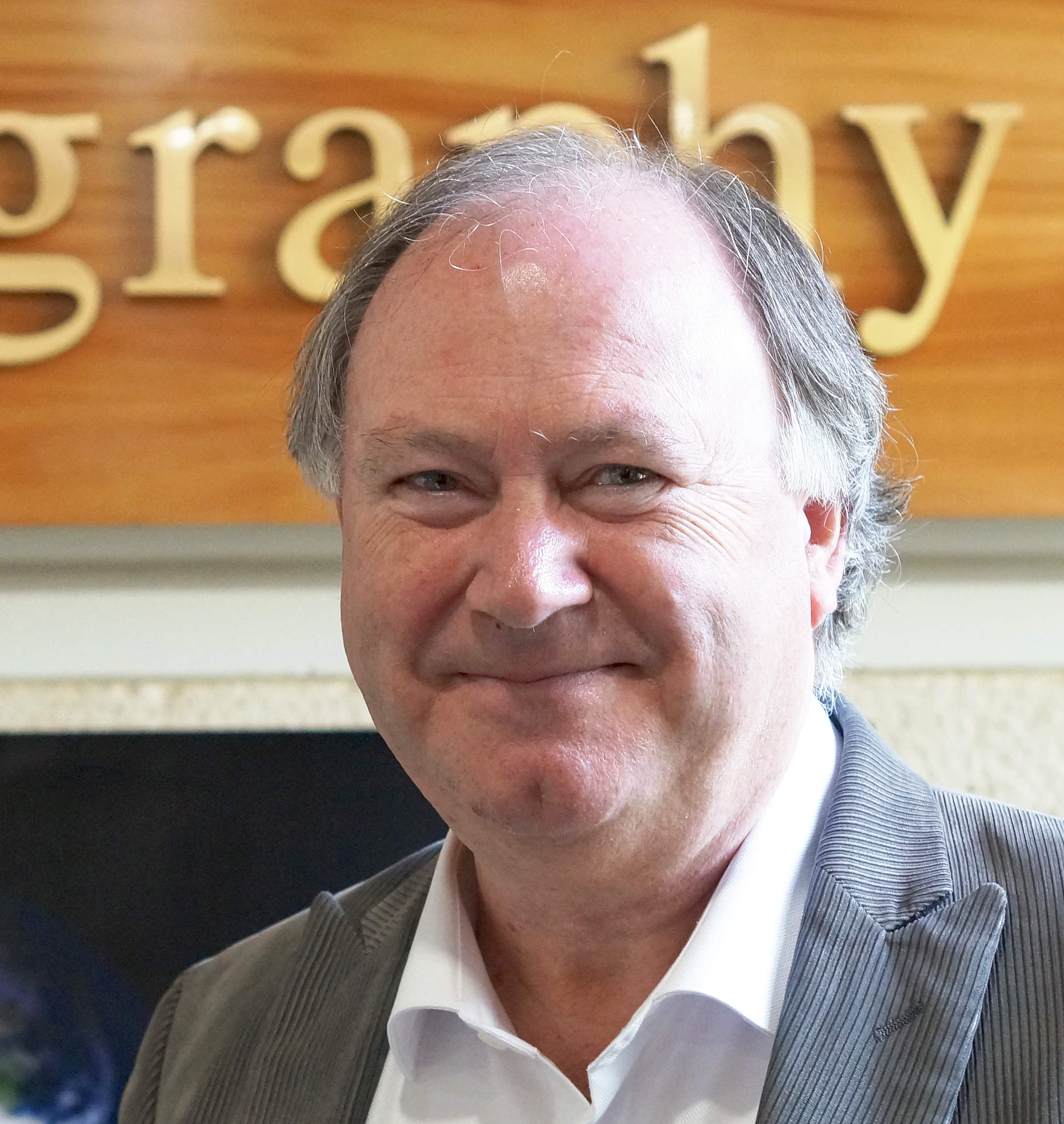
Keith C. Clarke

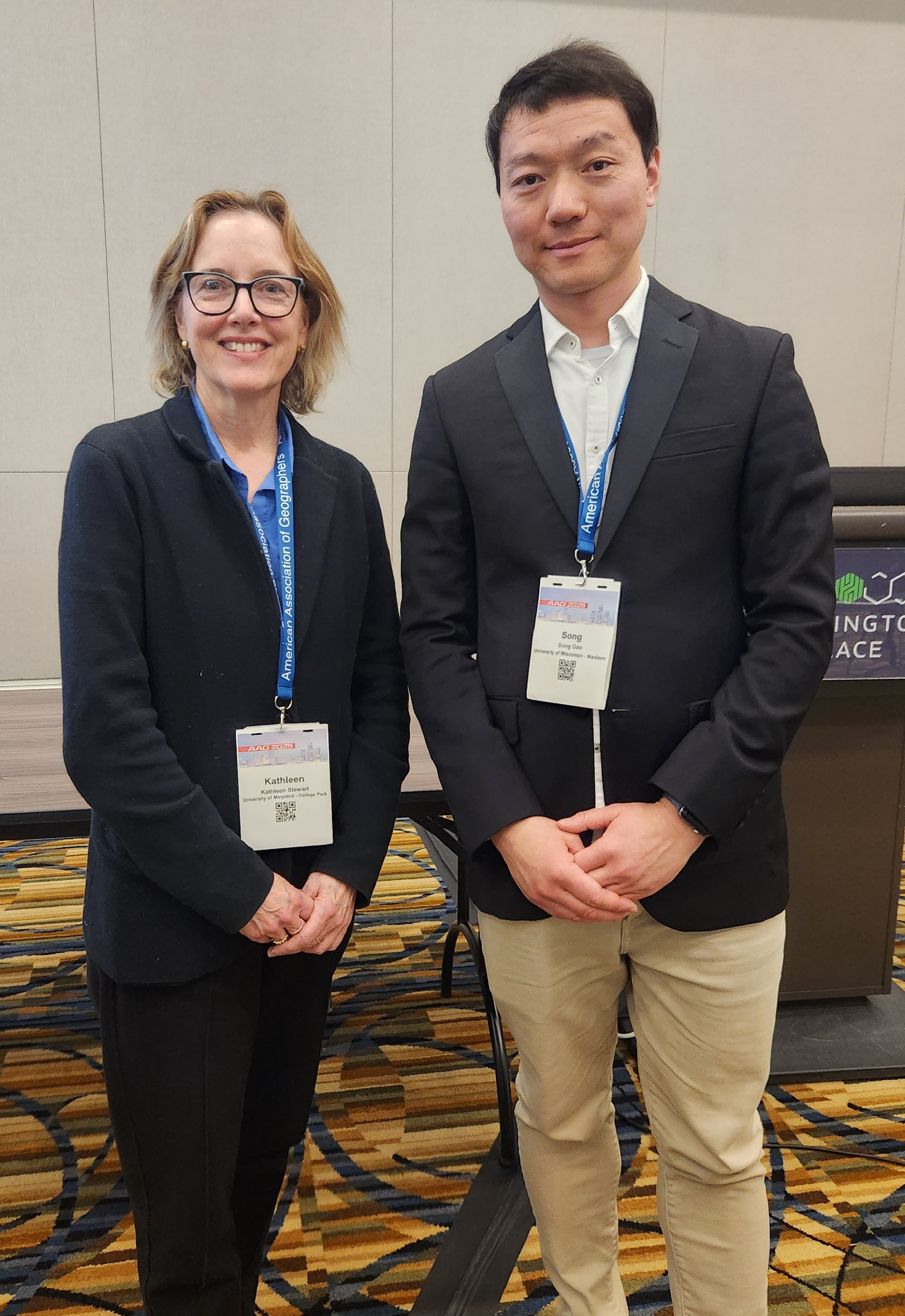
Kathleen Stewart and Song Gao

GISS Waldo Tobler and TGIS Distinguished Lecture in GIScience Speakers.

The Geographic Information Science and Systems Specialty Group (GISS SG) hosts a session annually to honor the legacy of Waldo Tobler with prominent speakers in Geographic information science. Speakers are awarded the "Waldo Tobler Award".

Winners of the Waldo Tobler Award include:

- Marc P. Armstrong (2008)
- David M. Mark (2009)
- André Skupin (2010)
- Richard J. Aspinall (2011)
- Dawn Wright (2013)
- Matt Duckham (2014)
- Elizabeth Wentz (2015)
- Alan MacEachren (2016)
- Arthur Getis (2017)
- May Yuan (2018)
- Keith Clarke (2019)
- Elizabeth Delmelle (2021)
- Robert Roth (2021)
- Clio Andris (2022)
- Trisalyn Nelson (2022)
- Christopher Lippitt (2023)
- Shaowen Wang (2023)
- Yao-Yi Chiang (2024)
- A-Xing Zhu (2024)
- Song Gao (2025)
- Kathleen Stewart (2025)

=== G. K. Gilbert Award for Excellence in Geomorphological Research ===
The G. K. Gilbert Award for Excellence in Geomorphological Research (not to be confused with the G. K. Gilbert Award given by the Geological Society of America), is presented to the author(s) of a single significant contribution to the published research literature in geomorphology.

=== Awards from the AAG Marble Fund for Geographic Science ===
In 2005, Duane Marble established the AAG Marble Fund For Geographic Science with the help of ESRI CEO Jack Dangermond. The fund promotes quantitative geography by rewarding student research that focuses on applying GIScience and computers to spatial problems. These awards include the Marble-Boyle Undergraduate Achievement Award, the Marble Fund Award for Innovative Master's Research in Quantitative Geography, and the William L. Garrison Award for Best Dissertation in Computational Geography.The Marble-Boyle Undergraduate Achievement Award is named for the Duane Marble and Geographer A. R. Boyle. It seeks to promote computer science and quantitative geography by providing undergraduates a cash prize of $1000 for their research. The Marble Fund Award for Innovative Master's Research in Quantitative Geography is named for Duane Marble, the creator of the Marble Fund. This award recognizes masters students who have performed innovative research advancing quantitative geography with $2000 and a certificate of merit. The William L. Garrison Award for Best Dissertation in Computational Geography is named for the transportation geographer William Garrison. William Garrison was highly influential in the quantitative revolution in geography and had many graduate students (dubbed the space cadets) who went on to be highly influential within the discipline, including Brian Berry, William Bunge, Michael Dacey, Arthur Getis, Duane Marble, and Waldo Tobler. Like the undergraduate and masters awards, this award seeks to recognize innovative research in quantitative and computational geography. Awardees are given a $3500 prize and a certificate of merit.

=== Other awards ===
AAG also issues an annual award to a university geography program that is helping advance the field of geography.

It also has a series of awards for significant books about geography, the John Brinckerhoff Jackson Prize, the AAG Globe Book Award for Public Understanding of Geography, and the AAG Meridian Book Award for Outstanding Scholarly Work in Geography.

== Presidents ==
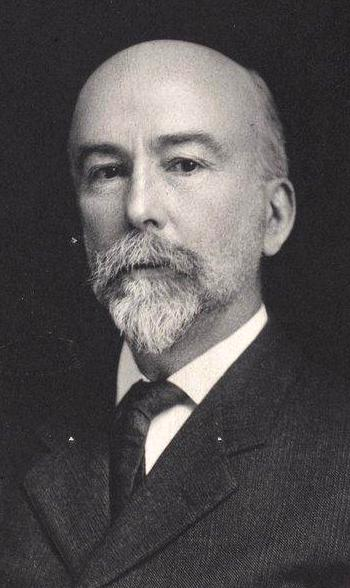
William Morris Davis, first president of the AAG

The role of president has existed within the AAG since its founding in 1904. People who have held the role include the following:

- William Morris Davis (1904–1906)
- Cyrus Cornelius Adams (1906–1907)
- Angelo Heilprin (1907) (Note: Died while in office)
- Grove Karl Gilbert (1908–1909)
- William Morris Davis (1909–1910)
- Henry C. Cowles (1910–1911)
- Ralph Stockman Tarr (1911–1912)
- Rollin D. Salisbury (1912–1913)
- Henry G. Bryant (1913–1914)
- Albert Perry Brigham (1914–1915)
- Richard E. Dodge (1915–1916)
- Mark Jefferson (1916–1917)
- Robert DeC. Ward (1917–1918)
- Nevin M. Fenneman (1918–1919)
- Charles R. Dryer (1919–1920)
- Herbert E. Gregory (1920–1921)
- Ellen Churchill Semple (1921–1922)
- Harlan H. Barrows (1922–1923)
- Ellsworth Huntington (1923–1924)
- Curtis F. Marbut (1924–1925)
- Ray H. Whitbeck (1925–1926)
- John Paul Goode (1926–1927)
- Marius R. Campbell (1927–1928)
- Douglas W. Johnson (1928–1929)
- Lawrence Martin (1929–1930)
- Almon E. Parkins (1930–1931)
- Isaiah Bowman (1931–1932)
- Oliver E. Baker (1932–1933)
- François E. Matthes (1933–1934)
- Wallace Walter Atwood (1934–1935)
- Charles C. Colby (1935–1936)
- William Herbert Hobbs (1936–1937)
- W. L. G. Joerg (1937–1938)
- Vernor C. Finch (1938–1939)
- Claude H. Birdseye (1939–1940)
- Carl O. Sauer (1940–1941)
- Griffith Taylor (1941–1942)
- J. Russell Smith (1942–1943)
- Hugh H. Bennett (1943–1944)
- Derwent Whittlesey (1944–1945)
- Robert S. Platt (1945–1946)
- John Kirtland Wright (1946–1947)
- Charles F. Brooks (1947–1948)
- Richard J. Russell (1948–1949)
- Richard Hartshorne (1949–1950)
- G. Donald Hudson (1950–1951)
- Preston E. James (1951–1952)
- Glenn Thomas Trewartha (1952–1953)
- J. Russell Whitaker (1953–1954)
- Joseph A. Russell (1954–1955)
- Louis O. Quam (1955–1956)
- Clarence F. Jones (1956–1957)
- Chauncy Harris (1957–1958)
- Lester E. Klimm (1958–1959)
- Paul Siple (1959–1960)
- Jan O. M. Broek (1960–1961)
- Gilbert F. White (1961–1962)
- Arch C. Gerlach (1962–1963)
- Arthur H. Robinson (1963–1964)
- Edward B. Espenshade, Jr. (1964–1965)
- Meredith F. Burrill (1965–1966)
- Walter M. Kollmorgen (1966–1967)
- Clyde F. Kohn (1967–1968)
- John R. Borchert (1968–1969)
- J. Ross Mackay (1969–1970)
- Norton S. Ginsburg (1970–1971)
- Edward J. Taaffe (1971–1972)
- Wilbur Zelinsky (1972–1973)
- Julian Wolpert (1973–1974)
- James J. Parsons (1974–1975)
- Marvin W. Mikesell (1975–1976)
- Harold M. Rose (1976–1977)
- Melvin G. Marcus (1977–1978)
- Brian Berry (1978–1979)
- John Fraser Hart (1979–1980)
- Nicholas Helburn (1980–1981)
- Richard Morrill (1981–1982)
- John S. Adams (1982–1983)
- Peirce F. Lewis (1983–1984)
- Risa Palm (1984–1985)
- Ronald F. Abler (1985–1986)
- George J. Demko (1986–1987)
- Terry G. Jordan (1987–1988)
- David Ward (1988–1989)
- Saul B. Cohen (1989–1990)
- Susan Hanson (1990–1991)
- John R. Mather (1991–1992)
- Thomas J. Wilbanks (1992–1993)
- Robert Kates (1993–1994)
- Stephen S. Birdsall (1994–1995)
- Judy M. Olson (1995–1996)
- Lawrence A. Brown (1996–1997)
- Patricia Gober (1997–1998)
- William L. Graf (1998–1999)
- Reginald Golledge (1999–2000)
- Susan L. Cutter (2000–2001)
- Janice J. Monk (2001–2002)
- Duane Nellis (2002–2003)
- Alexander B. Murphy (2003–2004)
- Victoria A. Lawson (2004–2005)
- Richard A. Marston (2005–2006)
- Kavita Pandit (2006–2007)
- Thomas J. Baerwald (2007–2008)
- John A. Agnew (2008–2009)
- Carol P. Harden (2009–2010)
- Kenneth E. Foote (2010–2011)
- Audrey Kobayashi (2011–2012)
- Eric Sheppard (2012–2013)
- Julie Winkler (2013–2014)
- Mona Domosh (2014–2015)
- Sarah Bednarz (2015–2016)
- Glen M. MacDonald (2016–2017)
- Derek Alderman (2017–2018)
- Sheryl Luzzadder-Beach (2018–2019)
- David H. Kaplan (2019–2020)
- Amy Lobben (2020–2021)
- Emily Yeh (2021–2022)
- Marilyn Raphael (2022–2023)
- Rebecca Lave (2023–2024)
- Patricia Ehrkamp (2024–2025)
- William Moseley (2025–2026)
- Sara Smith (2026-2027)

== See also ==
- American Geographical Society
- Geographers on Film
- International Geographical Union
- National Council for Geographic Education
- National Geographic Society
- Royal Canadian Geographical Society
- Royal Danish Geographical Society
- Russian Geographical Society
- University Consortium for Geographic Information Science
