= Ralph Stockman Tarr =

American geographer (1864–1912)

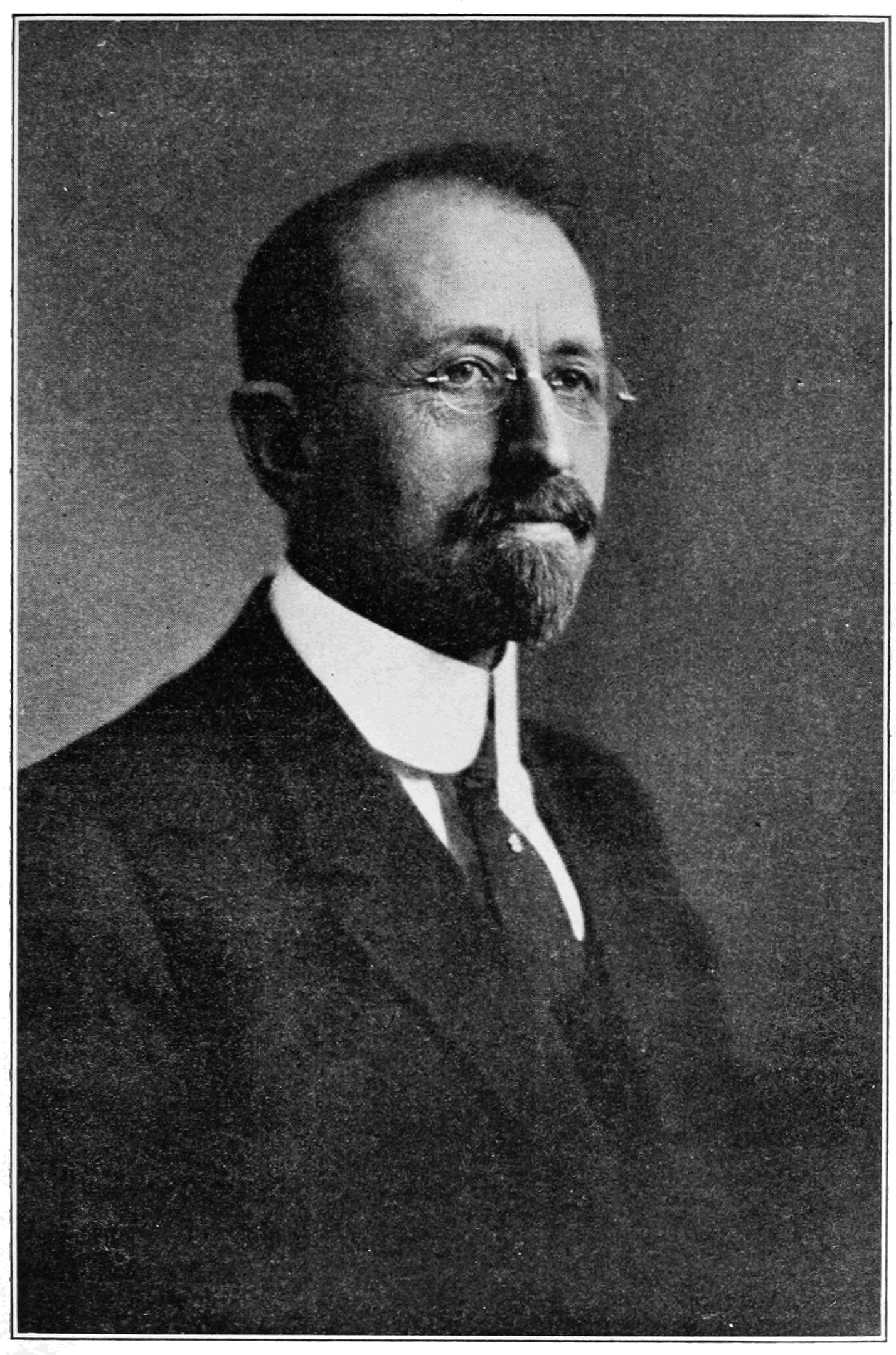
Ralph Stockman Tarr

Ralph Stockman Tarr (January 15, 1864 – March 21, 1912) was an American geographer, noted for his work in physical geography, in particular on glaciers and glaciated landforms, and as a teacher, and writer of textbooks and articles in popular science publications.

== Biography ==
Tarr was born at Gloucester, Massachusetts. His father was Silas Tarr, a contractor, and his mother was Abigail Tarr née Saunders. He graduated from the local high school in 1881, and then spent the summer in the school of zoology in Salem. He was enrolled at the Lawrence Scientific School, part of Harvard University. His student career was interrupted several times. In 1882 he began working as an assistant to Professor Hyatt at the marine biology lab in Annisquam, near Gloucester that was a predecessor of the laboratory at Woods Hole. The work involved dredging for marine specimens in the waters of Ipswich Bay. In 1883 he joined the U.S. Fish Commission directed by Spencer Baird, and took part in deep-sea exploration on the research ships Fish Hawk and Albatross. This led to several publications. In the later part of 1884 he worked as an assistant in the U.S. National Museum division of invertebrate biology, part of the Smithsonian Institution.

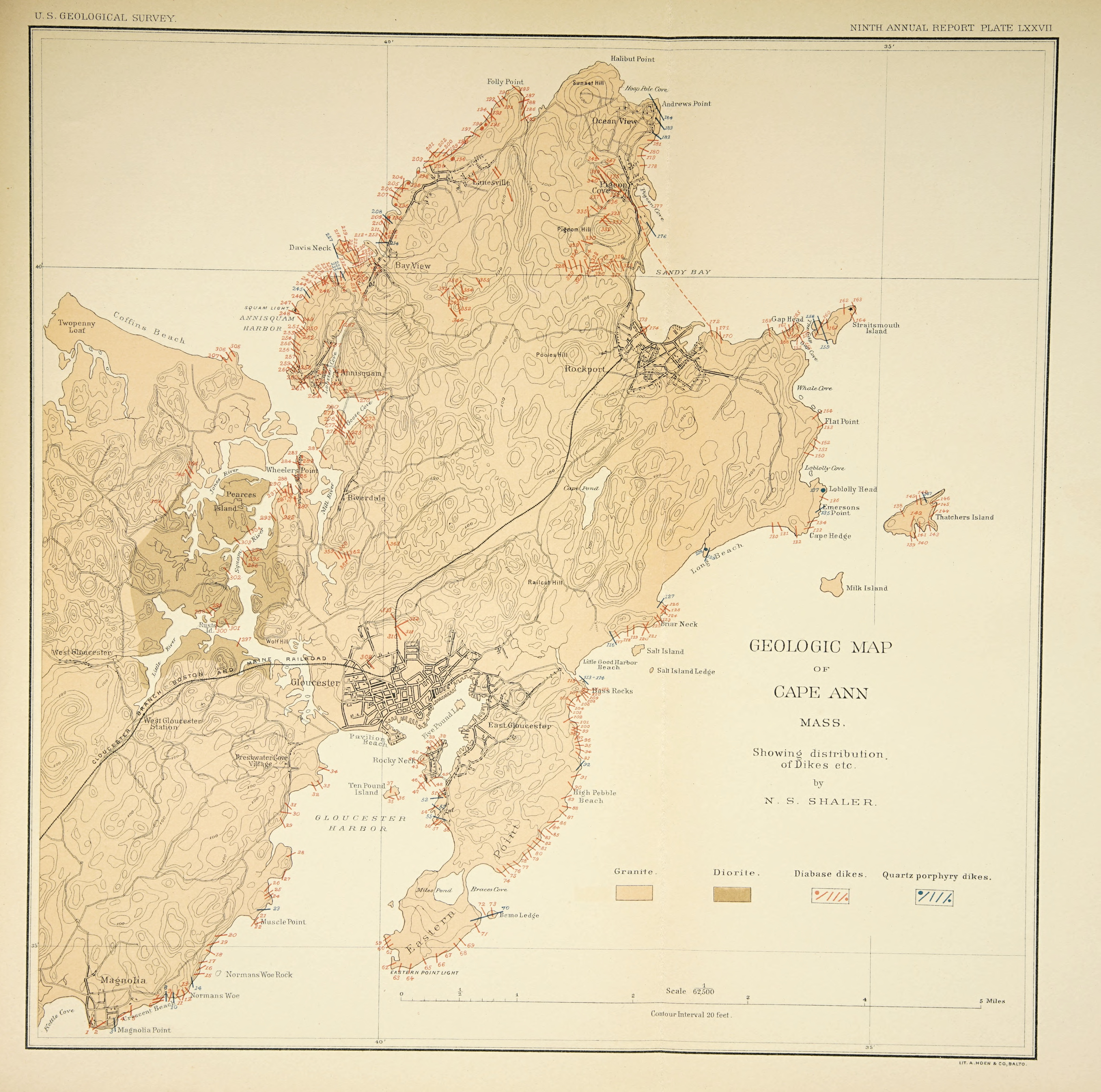
Geological Map of Cape Ann from the Geological Survey Report showing dikes surveyed by Tarr

In 1884, returning to Harvard, Tarr came under the influence of Professor Nathaniel Shaler and his interests shifted from zoology to geology. Following another interruption to his studies, described by Albert Brigham as a "long and disappointing experience on a western ranch", he resumed his studies under Shaler in 1887. He was now committed to geology and spent much time in field work on the geology of Cape Ann. This work contributed to the report on the area that was included in the Ninth Annual Report of the United States Geological Survey under Shaler's authorship. Shaler states "by far the larger part of the field observations embodied in this memoir have been made by my assistant, Mr. Ralph S. Tarr. All the detailed observations on the dikes and joint planes and on the petrography of the district are his".

Tarr worked as Assistant Geologist for the Texas Geological Survey in 1888 and 1891, and graduated from Harvard in 1891. Beginning in 1892, he served as assistant in geology at Cornell, where he became professor of dynamic geology and physical geography from 1897 until his death in 1912. He was in charge of the 1896 Cornell expedition to Greenland largely to study glaciology while being attached to the Peary expedition's goal to retrieve a large iron meteorite. He led several expeditions to Alaska between 1905 and 1911 including work on glaciers and the effects of the 1899 Yakutat Bay earthquakes. He served as president of the Association of American Geographers in 1911-1912.

== Greenland ==
In 1896 Tarr led a party to Greenland as part of the expedition led by Lieutenant Robert Peary on the S.S. Hope. They left Sydney, Nova Scotia, on 16th July, and passed up the coast of Labrador stopping at the Island of Turnavik. The next stop was on Big Island (Qikiqtarjuaq) in the Hudson Strait, after which an attempt to enter the Cumberland Sound was prevented by the ice. The ship then crossed the Davis Strait to the Greenland coast. After stopping at Upernavik the party landed on the Nugsuak (Nuussuaq ) Peninsula on 7th August. They remained there for a month, before returning by the same route. Tarr noted that the climate on the eastern (Greenland) side of the Davis Strait was much milder than that on the western (Labrador and Baffin Island) side.

The main aim of the expedition was to examine the geology of the area, in particular with relation to glaciers and glaciation. Tarr had studied glaciated landscapes in New England, but this was his first chance to see actual glaciers. At the head of the fjord to the south of the peninsula, Tarr and his colleagues found a large glacier which was an extension of the main Greenland ice-sheet. They named this the Cornell Glacier after their University, which had sponsored the expedition. Tarr noted evidence that the glacier appeared to be rapidly withdrawing, and argued that the ice sheet had previously been more extensive. This led to a disagreement with other recent observers in western Greenland, such as Thomas Chamberlin and Rollin Salisbury who held that the ice-sheet had never been much larger than when they observed it. The question of the maximum extent of the Greenland ice sheet continues to be controversial.

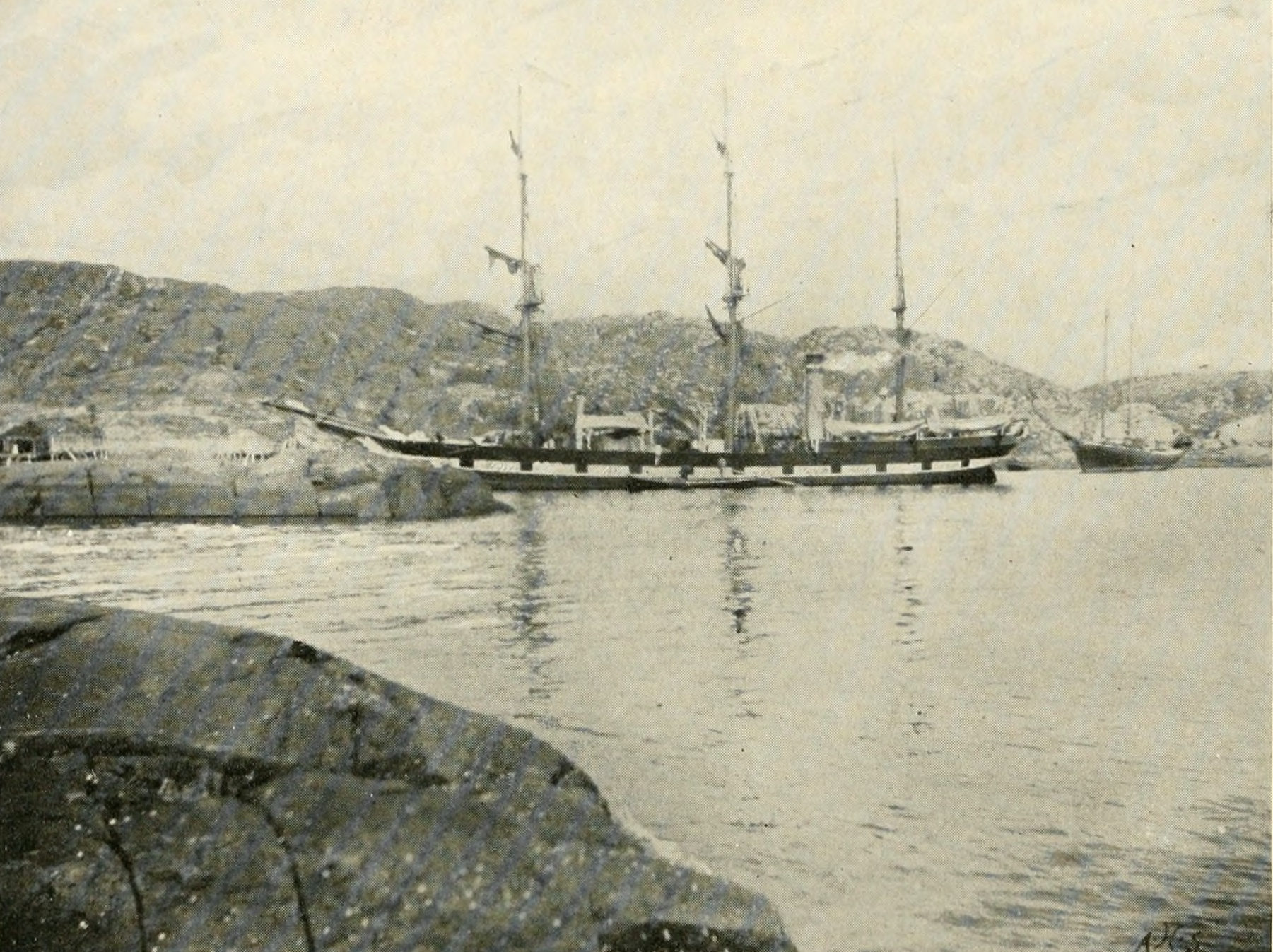
S.S. Hope at Turnavik Harbor

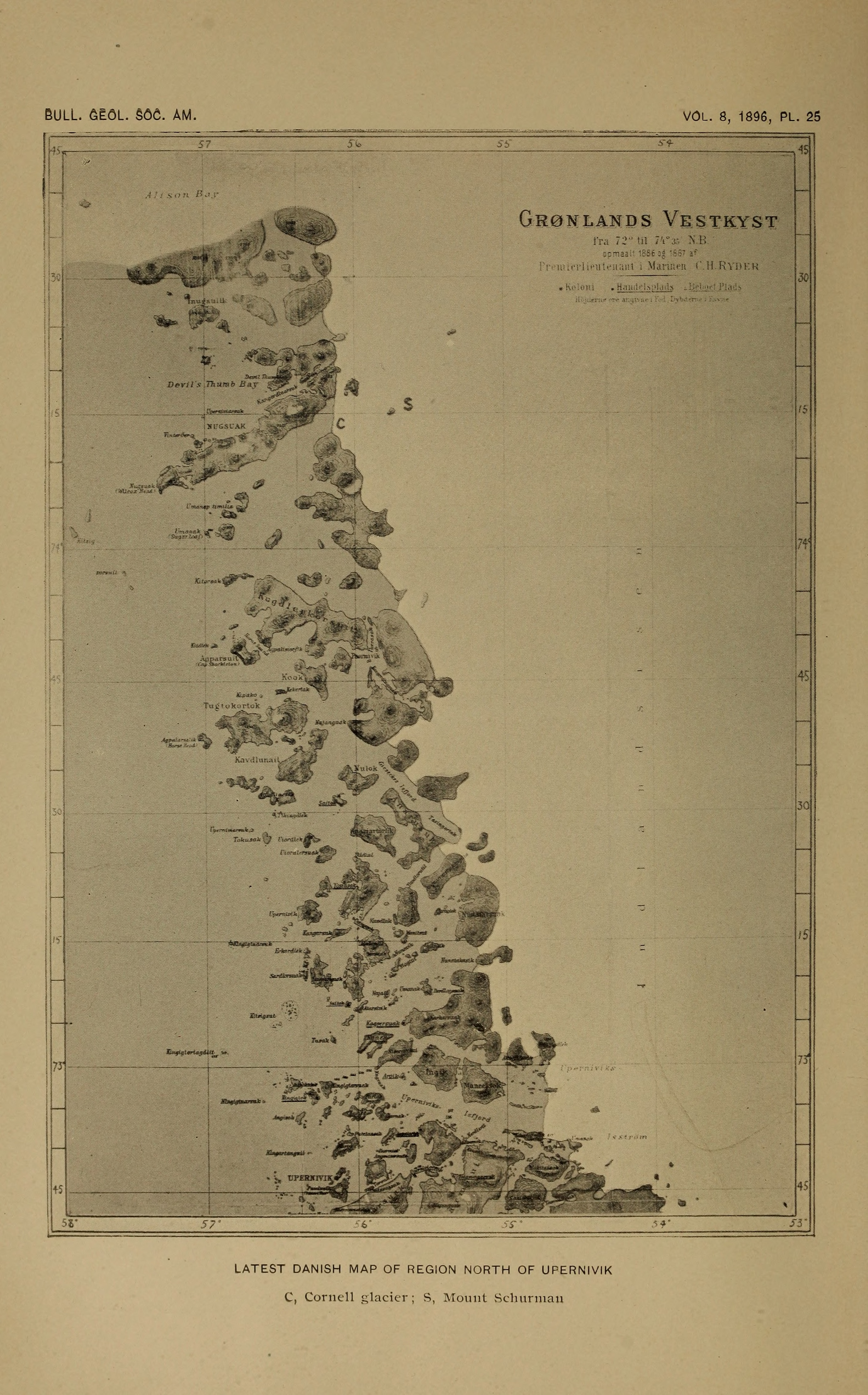
Danish map of the west coast of Greenland. C marks Cornell Glacier

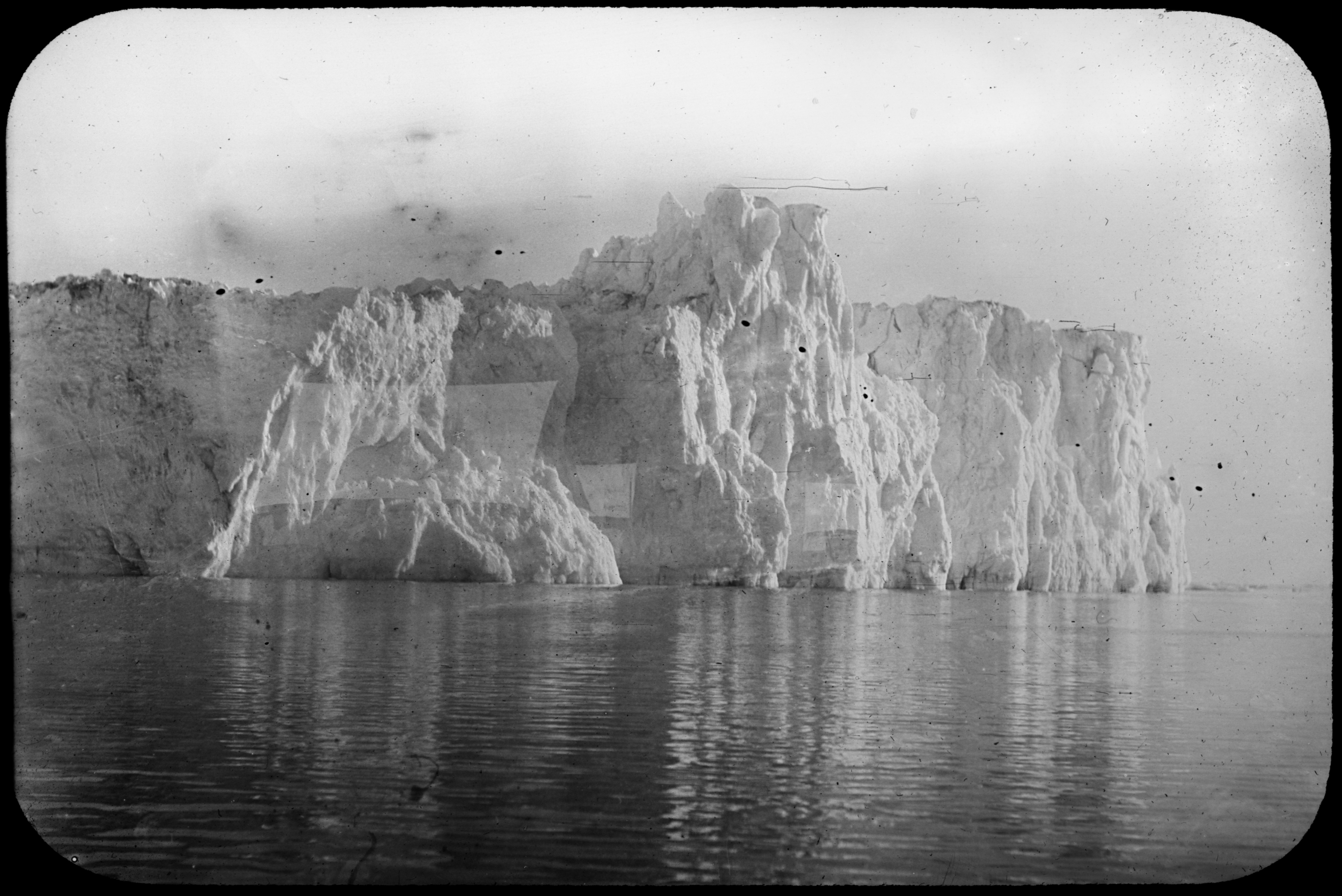
Sea face of the Cornell Glacier

== Alaska ==
Tarr took part in a number of expeditions to Alaska between 1905 and 1911. The 1905 expedition to Yakutat Bay was supported by the United States Geological Survey, and Tarr was assisted by Lawrence Martin and Bert S. Butler. This area had several large glaciers, and had been visited by other geologists, in particular Israel Russell in 1890 and G.K. Gilbert who was part of the Harriman Alaska expedition in 1899. The 1905 observations showed clear evidence of changes of level since the previous visits. These were mostly uplift, though some depression was also seen. The greatest elevation seen was 47 feet (14 m). Tarr interpreted these changes as a result of the 1899 earthquakes which was supported by the presence of the remains of barnacles and mussels well above high water mark, and also by the reports of indigenous peoples. Tarr and Martin also described the four large glaciers feeding into Yakutat Bay: Hubbard, Turner, Nunatak, and Hidden, as well as their main tributaries.

His work in 1905 persuaded Tarr that Alaska was the best place to study glaciers in action. When he returned to the same area the following year, he found dramatic changes since his previous visit. Several glaciers had advanced, in some cases as much as two miles. Previously smooth ice surfaces had become broken and crevassed to an extent that travel across them as now impossible. In some places mature wooded areas had been destroyed by the advance. Other glaciers, however, showed little change. Tarr considered several possible explanations for these changes, and concluded that the most probable cause was surging due to earthquake shocks, which would trigger avalanches in the mountainous area where the glaciers originated. This would lead to an increased flow and thus to the advance of the glacier downstream.. Tarr expanded this idea of the "Glacial Flood Hypothesis", with additional data from later expeditions, in a 1910 paper, and his collaborator Lawrence Martin noted the correlation between the length of a glacier and the delay in the surge after 1899. In 1911 Tarr and Martin were again in Alaska. Several publications on the Alaska work appeared after Tarr's death in March 1912.

The Glacial Flood Hypothesis was influential, in spite of some anomalous findings, particularly in the Copper River Valley which Tarr noted but did not try to explain. However, while later workers have acknowledged the importance of the work of Tarr and Martin in drawing attention to glacial surging, they have not generally accepted the Flood Hypothesis. Tarr and Martin were not able to make observations in the upper parts of the glaciers where avalanches were presumed to occur. Austin Post of the U.S. geological survey noted that the topography of these areas makes substantial snow avalanching unlikely. Using aerial photographs, he showed that the 1964 Alaska earthquake did not lead to significant avalanching. Post and other workers have shown that glacier surging is a much more general phenomenon than previously supposed, with surging in some glaciers occurring at intervals of 15-100 years, with no obvious relation to triggering events. The glaciers observed by Tarr and martin are among those that have been investigated more recently.

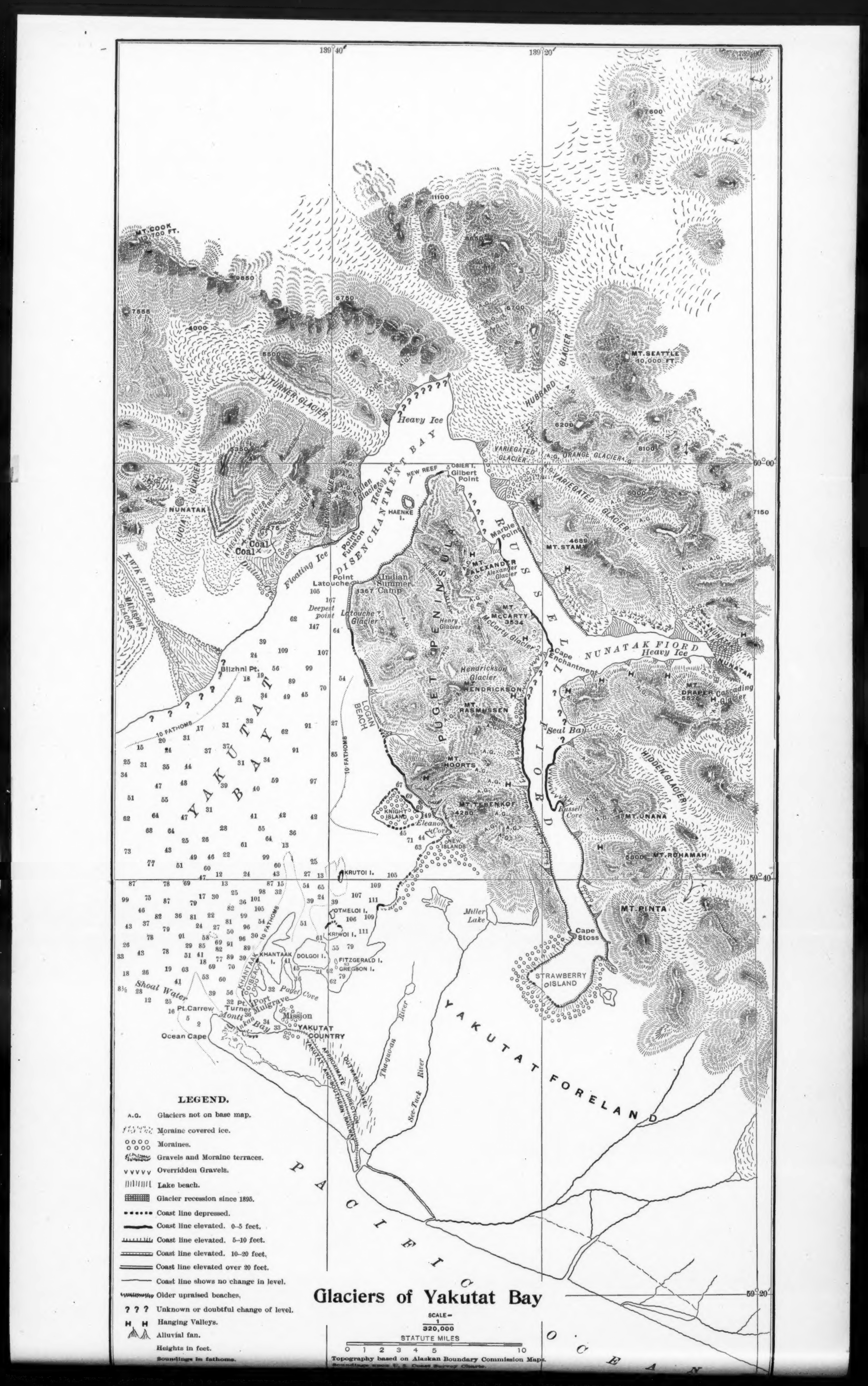
1906 Map of the glaciers of Yakutat Bay

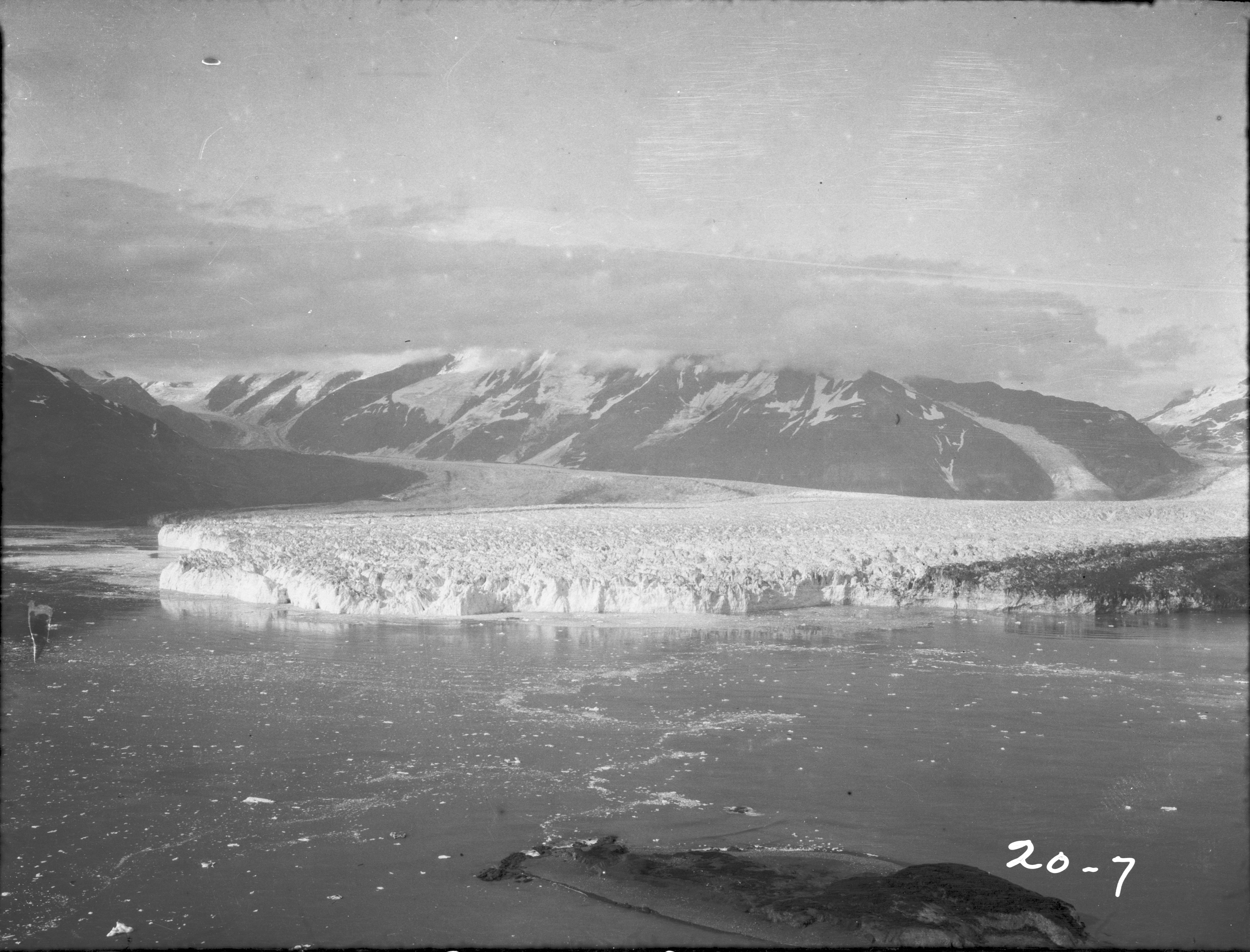
Hubbard Glacier from Gilbert Point

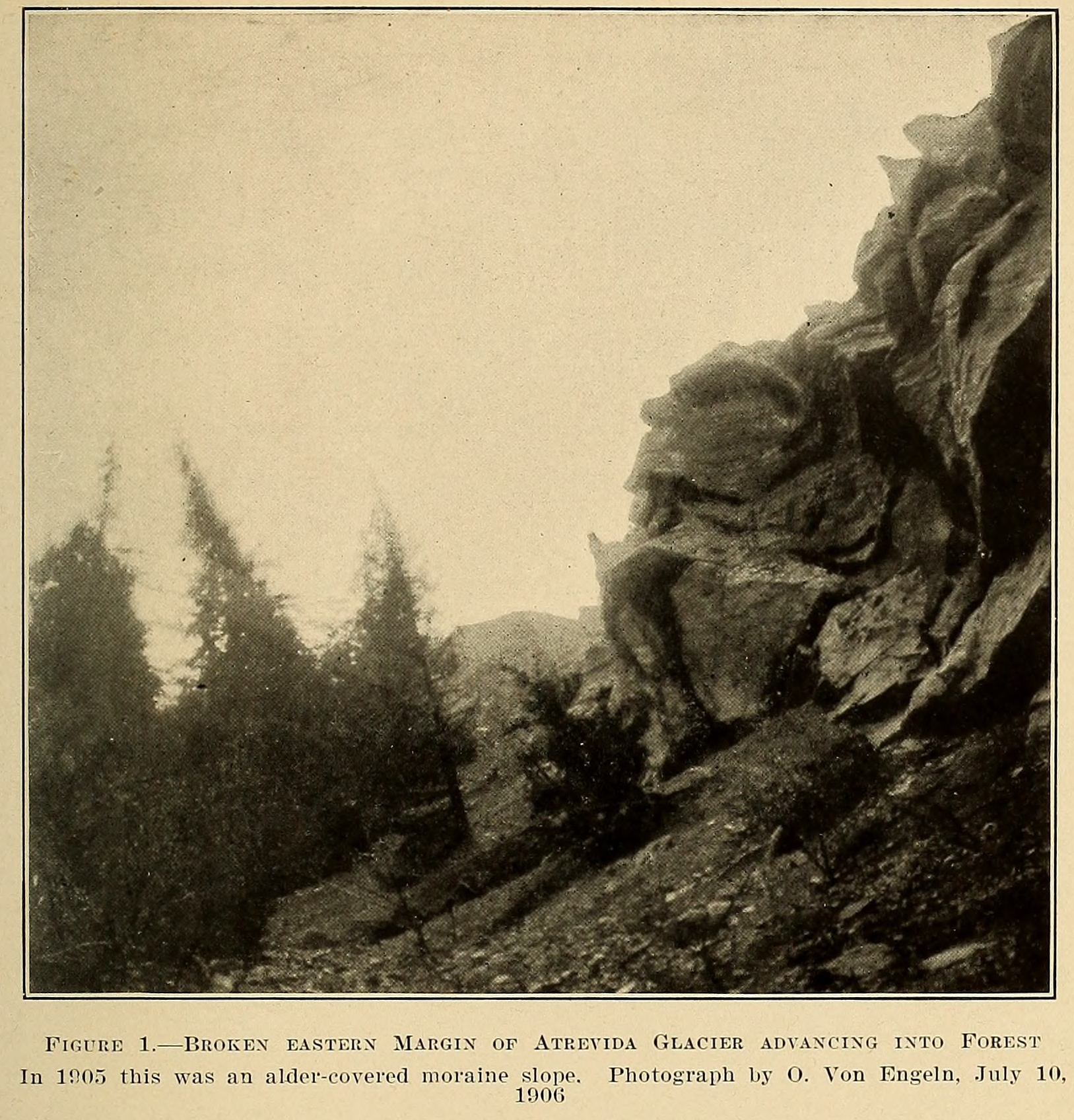
Eastern Margin of Atrevida Glacier encroaching on forest

== Writings ==
Besides acting as associate editor of the Bulletin of the American Geographical Society and the Journal of Geography and writing many journal articles, he published the following books:

- Economic Geology of the United States. Macmillan and Company. 1893. Second edition 1898.
- Physical Geography of New York State. Macmillan and Company. 1902.
- New Physical Geography. Macmillan and Company. 1903.
- Geography of Science. Macmillan and Company. 1905. With C. A. McMurry
- College physiography. Macmillan and Company. 1914. With Lawrence Martin.
- Alaskan Glacier Studies. National Geographic Society. 1914. With Lawrence Martin.
