= Cyrus Cornelius Adams =

American geographer and journalist

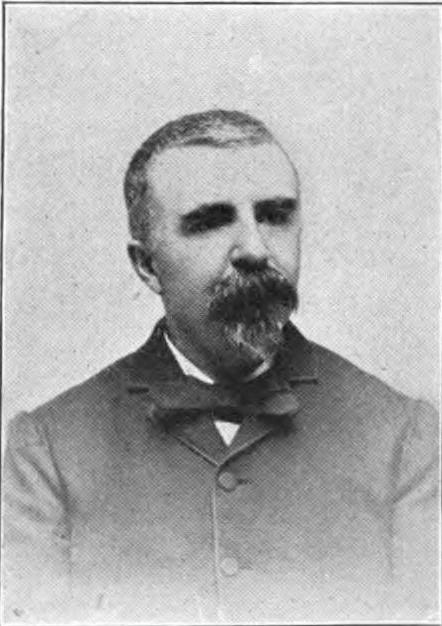
- Born: January 7, 1849; Naperville, Illinois, US
- Died: May 5, 1928 (aged 79); New York City, US
- Education: University of Chicago, graduating in 1876.
- Occupation: Geographer

Cyrus Cornelius Adams (January 7, 1849 – May 5, 1928) was an American geographer, journalist, and author. Adams served as the second president of the American Association of Geographers and was a prominent member of the American Geographical Society. Adams began his career as a journalist, and did not have any formal geography education. Adams is noteworthy as an early economic geographer, and published textbooks on the topic.

== Education ==
Adams first attended the University of Minnesota. He then attended the University of Chicago, graduating with a Bachelor of Arts in 1876.

== Career and publications ==
Adams began his career as a journalist. While in college, he worked as a reporter for the Chicago Inter Ocean. He was on the editorial staff for the New York City-based newspaper, The Sun, from 1880 to 1903, and served as an editor for Goldthwaite's Geographical Magazine from 1891 to 1892. He became interested in geography by covering topics related to Africa and the Arctic during this time, specifically related to exploration.

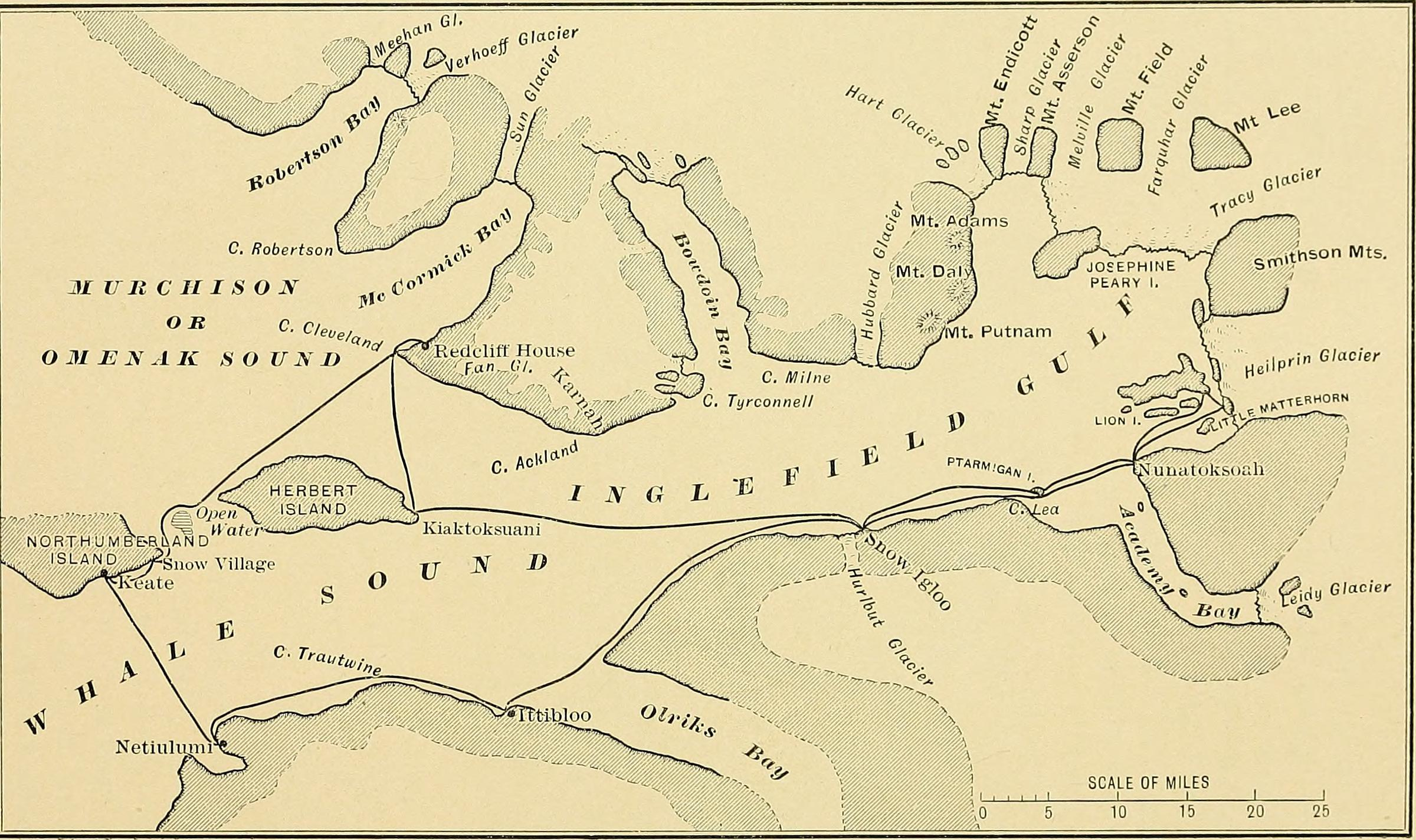
Map from Robert Peary's Northward Over the Great Ice showing Mt. Adams in the Inglefield Gulf.

While covering exploration, Adams maintained relationships with several prominent explorers. Through his coverage of African exploration, he was described as having formed a close relationship with Welsh-American explorer Henry Morton Stanley. Adams was also described as having a close friendship with Arctic explorer Robert Peary, serving as a "mouthpiece" for Peary's plans and results. Adams 1893 publication in The Geographical Journal served as a technical description of the Peary expedition to Greenland of 1891–1892. Peary named Mt. Adams in the Inglefield Gulf after Adams.

Adams joined the American Geographical Society in 1892 Bulletin of the American Geographical Society from 1908 to 1915. He contributed to the creation of the Geographical Review.

Adams was a founding member of the American Association of Geographers and served as the second president of the organization from 1906 to 1907.

=== Select publication ===
Adams is noteworthy for publishing two early textbooks on economic geography, A text-book of commercial geography in 1901 and An elementary commercial geography in 1902. Throughout his career, Adams published several articles in magazaines, newspapers, and peer-reviewed journals.

Article title	Date	Publisher	Identifier	Citation(s)
Railroad development in Africa	1893	Engineering Magazine		
David Livingstone, 1813-1873: African development	1902	Beacon Lights of History		
What Stanley lived to see accomplished	1904	Beacon Lights of History		
Foundations of economic progress in tropical Africa	1911	Bulletin of the American Geographical Society	doi:10.2307/199996	
The African colonies of Germany and the War	1911	Geographical Review	doi:10.2307/207488	
Lieutenant Peary's Arctic Work	1893	The Geographical Journal	doi:10.2307/1773913	
Maps and Map-Making	1912	Bulletin of the American Geographical Society	doi:10.2307/200674	
The commercial geography of Europe	1897	The Chautauquan		
The trend of American commerce	1897	The Chautauquan		
Distribution of manufacturing in the United States	1897	The Chautauquan		
The geographical position of Germany	1897	The Chautauquan		
The Sargasso Sea	1907	Harper's Magazine		
The United States—Land and Waters	1903	National Geographic		
Some Phases of Future Geographical Work in America	1907	Bulletin of the American Geographical Society	doi:10.2307/197369	

== Personal life ==
Adams was the son of Cyrus and Cornelia (Stevens), but due to the absence of his parents, he was raised by his aunt and uncle in Bloomington, Minnesota. (Note: Multiple sources mention Cyrus was raised by his aunt and uncle due to the absence of his parents, but do not specify why they were absent.) Adams married Blanche C. Dodge in 1877, and had a son and daughter with her.

== See also ==
- Gamma Theta Upsilon – International geography honor society
- Marilyn Raphael – Trinidadian climatologist
- Rebecca Lave – American critical physical geographer
- Waldo Tobler – American geographer
- Yi-Fu Tuan – Chinese-American geographer (1930–2022)
