= William Wyckoff =

American geographer

William Wyckoff is an American geographer. He is professor emeritus of geography at Montana State University.

In 2023, he received Lifetime Achievement Honors from the American Association of Geographers.

== Books ==
- The Developer's Frontier: The Making of the Western New York Landscape (Yale University Press, 1988)
- with Lary Dilsaver The Mountainous West: Explorations in Historical Geography (Nebraska Press, 1995)
- Creating Colorado: The Making of a Western American Landscape (Yale University Press, 1999)
- On the Road Again: Montana's Changing Landscape (Washington Press, 2006)
- How to Read the American West: A Field Guide (University of Washington Press, 2014)
- Mac McCloud's Five Points: Photographing Black Denver, 1938–1975 (2023)
