= Annals of the American Association of Geographers =

- Discipline: Geography
- Language: English

Publication details
- Former name(s): Annals of the Association of American Geographers
- History: 1911–present
- Publisher: Taylor and Francis on behalf of the American Association of Geographers (United States)
- Frequency: Bimonthly
- Impact factor: 2.756 (2015)

Standard abbreviations
- ISO 4: Ann. Am. Assoc. Geogr.

Indexing
- ISSN: 2469-4452 (print); 2469-4460 (web)
- JSTOR: 00045608
- OCLC no.: 1514553

Links
- Journal homepage; Online access

The Annals of the American Association of Geographers is a bimonthly peer-reviewed academic journal covering geography. It was established in 1911 as the Annals of the Association of American Geographers.

The journal is published by Taylor and Francis on behalf of the American Association of Geographers. Its other official journals are The Professional Geographer, AAG Review of Books, GeoHumanities, and African Geographical Review. According to the Journal Citation Reports, the journal has a 2015 impact factor of 2.756, ranking it 8th out of 77 journals in the category "Geography".
