= William Herbert Hobbs =

American geologist (1864–1953)

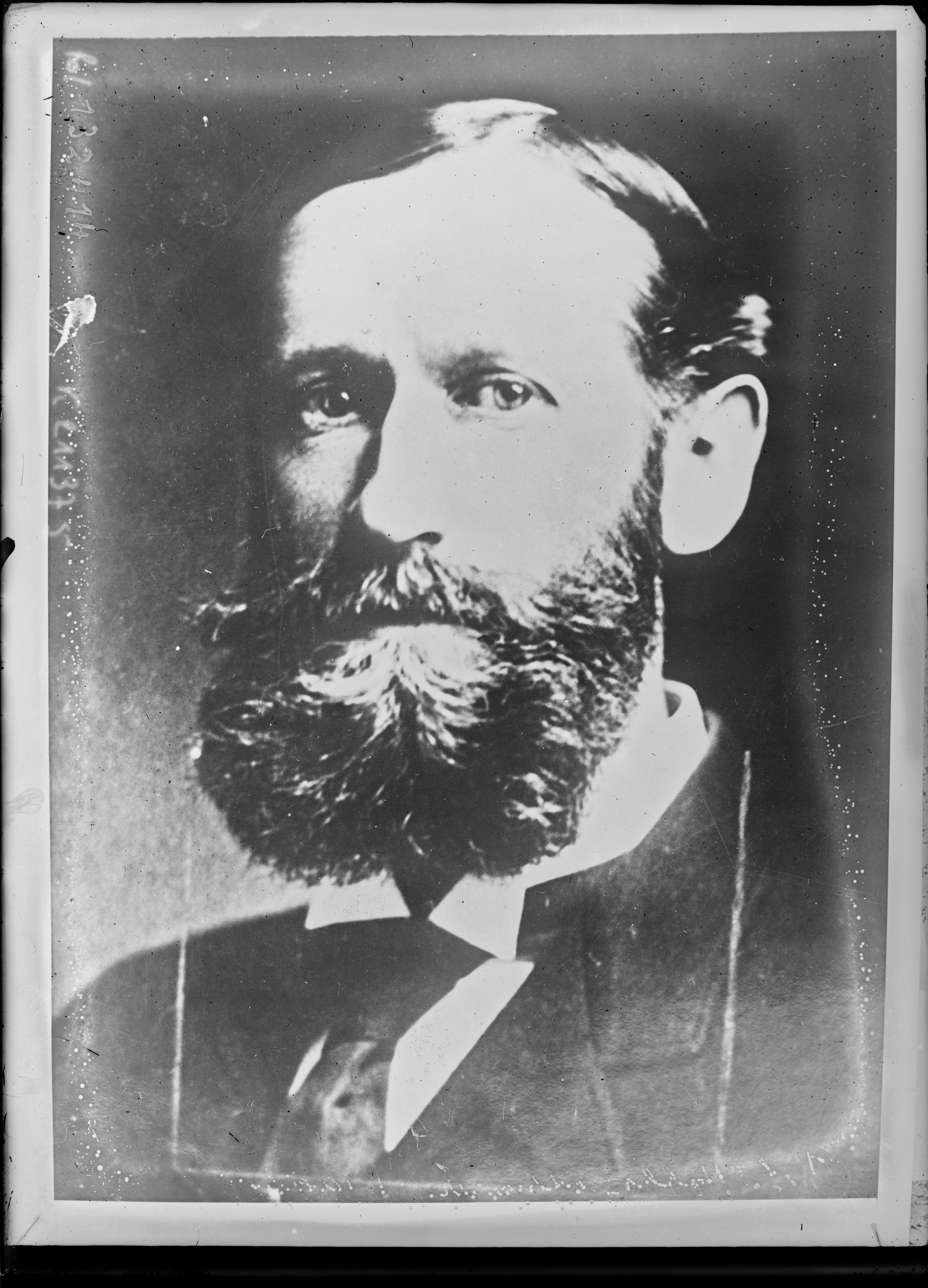
Hobbs in 1928

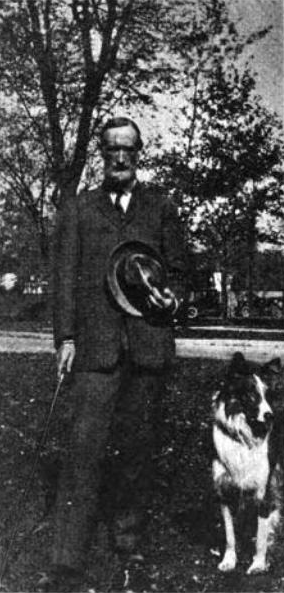
William Herbert Hobbs c. 1925

William Herbert Hobbs, Ph.D. (Worcester, Mass., July 2, 1864 – Ann Arbor, MI, January 1, 1953) was an American geologist.

== Background and education ==
William Herbert Hobbs, geologist and leader of four expeditions to Greenland, was born in Worcester, Massachusetts, July 2, 1864, the son of Horace and Mary Paine (Parker) Hobbs. He was educated at Worcester Polytechnic Institute (in 1883 he was graduated with the degree of Bachelor of Science.), at Johns Hopkins (Ph.D., 1888), and at Heidelberg (1888–89).

== Career ==
He filled several positions at the University of Wisconsin–Madison (1889–1906). From 1886 to 1906 he served with the United States Geological Survey. He received his appointment as Professor of Geology, Aug. 6, 1906. He also taught at the University of Michigan (1906 - 1934).

During his career, Hobbs lead four expeditions to Greenland and made several trips in Europe. In about 1906, he made a "record ascent" of Mont Blanc, "lowering the previous record by an hour and a half," according to one biographical source which offers no further detail nor source information. Hobbs gained notoriety in 1909, when he denounced as fraud Dr. Frederick Cook's claim of having reached the North Pole. Hobbs was then counter-attacked by Cook.

A few years later, Hobbs crusaded actively for American participation in World War I, helping to found and lead the 1915 Ann Arbor Branch of the National Security League, he subsequently engaged in related and comparable actions to discourage formation of the League of Nations.

Professional and scientific organizations to which Hobbs has been elected to membership or to office are the following:

- Fellow, Geological Society of America (1892);
- Phi Beta Kappa Society (1902);
- Seismological Committee of the American Association for the Advancement of Science (1907);
- Wisconsin Academy of Sciences, Arts and Letters (life member, 1892);
- Fellow, American Philosophical Society (1909);
- vice-president, (1917), president (1935), Association of American Geographers;
- member, Washington Academy of Sciences, Arts and Letters (1914);
- vice-president for geology and mineralogy, Michigan Academy of Science (1907);
- president, Michigan Academy of Sciences, Arts and Letters (1916);
- honorary member, Veterans of Foreign Wars (1920);
- Fellow, American Meteorological Society (1929);
- first vice-president, Geological Society of America, (1922);
- Chevalier of the Legion of Honor (France) (1924);
- Council of American Philosophical Society (1929–32);
- Honorary Degree, Doctor of Engineering, Worcester Polytechnic Institute (1929);
- member, Explorers Club, New York (1930);
- vice-president, International Glacier Commission (1930–34);
- vice-president, American Association for the Advancement of Science (1933);
- Fellow, American Geographic Society (1933);
- honorary member, Russian Geographical Society (in Leningrad) (1934);
- Fellow, Geographic Society of Chicago (1937);
- Honorary Degree, Doctor of Laws, University of Michigan (1939);
- emeritus life membership, American Association for the Advancement of Science (1939).

He became editor of the Journal of Geology in 1909.

== Personal ==
On June 23, 1896, he was married at Evanston, Illinois, to Mrs. Sara Kimball Sale, who died in 1940. They had one daughter, Winifred Sara Weston Hobbs, (b. 1899) who later became Mrs. Joseph Newhall Lincoln.

He died in Ann Arbor, MI on January 1, 1953, at the age of 88.

== Bibliography ==
- "On the Geological Structure of the Mount Washington Mass of the Taconic Range" 1893, The Journal of Geology, Vol. 1 No. 7
- Earthquakes: An Introduction to Seismic Geology (1907)
- Characteristics of Existing Glaciers (1911)
- Earth Features and their Meaning (1912).
- The World War and Its Consequences (1919)
- An Explorer-Scientist's Pilgrimage: the Autobiography of William Herbert Hobbs (1952).
