= Mande Studies Association =

Mande Studies Association Association des Études Mandé
- Abbreviation: MANSA
- Formation: 1986; 40 years ago
- Type: Non-profit
- Members: (1986)
- Official language: English and French
- Website: mandestudies.org

The Mande Studies Association (MANSA, also Association des Études Mandé) is an international organisation with an academic or professional interest in the Mande region of West Africa. The organization was founded at the University of Wisconsin in 1986; it operates in both English and French. A newsletter, the MANSA Newsletter, was published from to 1986 to 2014; its official academic journal is Mande Studies. The acronym of the organization, MANSA, has an additional meaning of "king" in the Bambara language. MANSA has been an associate organization of the African Studies Association, a broader academic organisation related to African studies, since 1993.

== Mande Studies ==
Mande Studies is an annual peer-reviewed academic journal covering all aspects of the Mandé peoples of Africa. It is published by the Indiana University Press on behalf of the Mande Studies Association.
