= Richard Joel Russell =

Richard Joel Russell (16 November 1895 – 17 September 1971) was an American professor of physical geography and geology at the Louisiana State University who contributed to pioneering studies of long-term climatology and geomorphology.

Russell was born in Hayward, California to Nellie Potter Morril and lawyer Frederick James. His early education was in Honololu where he went to the Punahou Kindergarten. The family moved back to California and studied at the Hayward High School before going to the University of California, Berkeley where he began to study forestry in 1915 after becoming interested on a hunting trip in Santa Lucia. At the age of seventeen he was into numerous pastimes and his first publication was on a new technique for processing color photographs. He was drafted into World War I service but discharged after it was found that a compound fracture had set badly making him physically unfit. He was then assigned to teach seamanship and gunnery. After the war he returned to university and began to study paleontology under John C. Merriam and graduated in 1920. He went on expeditions with Chester Stock into Nevada and Oregon in 1919-20 and took up a teaching fellowship, while also substituting for Professor Ruliff S. Holway in teaching geography. During his teaching career, he worked with his students to produce a summary of past climate called Climates of California which was to prove very influential. He studied petrography and structural geology for his doctorate under George D. Louderback in 1926. He then moved to Texas Technical College, Lubbock as an associate professor. He began to work on his climate research and produced Dry Climates of the United States (1931) which emphasized the use of median values rather than averages. In 1928 he joined Louisiana State University at Baton Rouge and involved in setting up a geography course along with Henry V. Howe. In 1954 he established the Coastal Studies Institute and directed it until 1966.

Russell was married twice, first to Mary Dorothy King in 1925 and after her death he married Josephine Burke in 1940. He had a son from the first marriage and four from the second.

== Books ==
- Culture Worlds
- River Plains and Sea Coasts
