= Journal of Geography =

- Discipline: Geography
- Language: English

Publication details
- History: 1902–present
- Publisher: Taylor & Francis (United States)

Standard abbreviations
- ISO 4: J. Geogr.

The Journal of Geography is an American academic journal published by Taylor & Francis on behalf of the National Council for Geographic Education (NCGE). The journal "provides a forum to present innovative approaches to geography research, teaching, and learning. The Journal publishes original studies, critical reviews, case insights, methods, and evaluations of books."

As of 2026, the Editor-in-chief is Injeong Jo of Texas State University, USA The journal has a 5-year Impact Factor of 2.2 as of 2024

Journal of Geography was first published in 1902 by the American Geographical Society (AGS). The journal was gifted by AGS to the National Council of Geography Teachers (later renamed National Council for Geographic Education) in 1915. The fifteenth volume of the journal (for 1916-17), was the first produced under the guidance of NCGE and Editor Ray Hughes Whitbeck of the University of Wisconsin with a new coverline: "A Monthly Magazine Devoted to the Interests of Teachers of Geography in Elementary, Secondary, and Normal Schools."
