= Lawrence Martin (geographer) =

North American geographer

Lawrence Martin (February 14, 1880 – February 12, 1955) was an American geographer and president of the American Association of Geographers.

A native of Stockbridge, Massachusetts, Martin received his undergraduate degree from Cornell University in 1904, before heading to Harvard University to work with William Morris Davis for his Master's degree, received in 1906. He then returned to Cornell and completed his PhD in 1913.

From 1903 to 1917 he worked for the U.S. Geological Survey as an expert in geomorphology.

From 1906 to 1917 he was a faculty member at the University of Wisconsin, rising from Lecturer to Assistant Professor and authoring major works on the physiography of Wisconsin. With the outbreak of World War I, he volunteered to instruct draftees in map interpretation at Fort Sheridan, IL. He quickly was made Colonel and served in the Military Intelligence Division, including assisting in the redrawing of boundaries after the war. The maps he produced during his surveying and ethnological field work in Austria served as the basis for the formation of Burgenland, the ninth state of Austria. On the occasion of the 100th anniversary of the formation of the region, his legacy was honored in the intermission film of the 2021 Vienna New Year's Concert. In the film, he is portrayed by Austrian stage actor Oliver Liebl.

After the war, he served as the Geographer in the Office of the Geographer at the Department of State before heading the Geography & Maps Division of the Library of Congress, a position he held until 1946.

He died in Washington, D. C.
