= African Geographical Review =

- Discipline: Geography
- Language: English
- Edited by: Julie Ann Silva

Publication details
- Former name(s): East African Geographical Review
- Publisher: Taylor & Francis on behalf of the Africa Specialty Group (Association of American Geographers)
- Frequency: Biannually

Standard abbreviations
- ISO 4: Afr. Geogr. Rev.

Indexing
- ISSN: 1937-6812 (print); 2163-2642 (web)
- LCCN: 67038577
- OCLC no.: 51782062

Links
- Journal homepage; Online access; Online archive

The African Geographical Review is a biannual peer-reviewed academic journal published by Taylor & Francis on behalf of the American Association of Geographers' Africa Specialty Group.

The journal was originally established in 1963 at Makerere University (Uganda) as the East African Geographical Review. Due to political turmoil in Uganda, the journal had to suspend publication for a number of years. It was renamed as the African Geographical Review in 2000. Since 2012 it is published by Taylor & Francis.
