= Albert Perry Brigham =

American geologist (1855–1932)

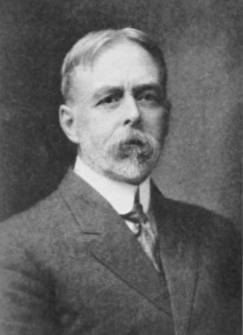
- Born: June 12, 1855; Perry, New York
- Died: March 31, 1932 (aged 76); Washington, D.C.
- Spouse: Flora Winegar (m. 1882)
- Scientific career
- Fields: Geology

Albert Perry Brigham, A.M. (1855–1932) was an American geologist, educated at Colgate College, Hamilton Theological Seminary, and Harvard University.

== Early life ==
Albert Perry Brigham was born in Perry, New York, on June 12, 1855.

== Ordination ==
He was ordained a Baptist minister and held pastorates at Stillwater, N. Y. (1882–85) and at Utica, N. Y. (1885–91). From 1892 onward, he worked in the field of geology at different places and in different positions.

== Personal life ==
Brigham married Flora Winegar on June 27, 1882, and they had one daughter.

He died in Washington, D.C., on March 21, 1932.

== Publications ==
Besides having been editor of the Bulletin of the American Geographical society, he was author of:

- A Text-Book of Geology (1900)
- Geographic Influences in American History (1903)
- Student's Laboratory Manual of Physical geography (1904)
- From Trail to Railway through the Appalachians (1907)
- Commercial Geography (1910)
- Essentials of Geography (1916)
