= Marilyn Raphael =

Trinidadian climatologist

- Born: Trinidad
- Citizenship: Trinidad and Tobago, United States
- Education: McMaster University (BA); Ohio State University (MA, PhD)
- Scientific career
- Fields: Climatology, environmentalism, geography
- Workplaces: University of California, Los Angeles
- Website: geog.ucla.edu/person/marilyn-raphael/

Marilyn N. Raphael is a Trinidadian climatologist, best known for her work on climate change and variability in the high latitude southern hemisphere. She is a professor and former chair of the Department of Geography at UCLA, has authored an award-winning text, and sits in leadership positions on a number of international polar research initiatives.

In 2023, she was elected to the American Philosophical Society. She was elected a Member of the National Academy of Sciences in 2025.

== Early life and education ==
Raphael was born and grew up in Trinidad and Tobago. She obtained a Bachelor of Arts in geography from McMaster University in 1984, and a Master of Arts and PhD in geography (1990) from Ohio State University. Her PhD work focused on atmospheric circulation and sensible heat flux in the Northern Hemisphere.

== Career ==
Raphael's research interests are global climate change and variability, specifically climate dynamics in the middle and high latitude of the Southern Hemisphere and the interaction between Antarctic sea ice and the atmosphere. Her research uses global climate models and also large-scale observational databases.

Raphael has been teaching at UCLA since 1998 and spent time as departmental chair (2010–2013). Notable courses include: Climatology, Environmental Impact Analysis, Seminar - Environmental Studies, Tropical Climatology, and Issues in Geographical Inquiry.

== Influences ==
Growing up, education was of the utmost importance for Raphael. Her mother was one of the key driving factors for pushing an education because she saw that education was the key to advancing in life. Raphael's path to climatology specifically was internally driven; however, she had people in her life that served as role models and mentors. Her high school teacher as well as her undergraduate adviser were both very encouraging of her pursuits into the geosciences. Raphael's interest in the Southern Hemisphere specifically came about when she was pursuing her PhD in geography.

== Positions and accomplishments ==
Marilyn N. Raphael is a professor in the Department of Geography at UCLA and is a former chair of the department, serving between 2010 and 2013.

Raphael is a co-chair of the Scientific Committee on Antarctic Research (SCAR) expert group Antarctic Sea Ice Processes and Climate (ASPeCt). She is also a co-lead of the World Climate Research Programme's Polar Climate Predictability Initiative (PCPI). Raphael has also served on the National Research Council's Committee on Future Science Opportunities in Antarctica and the Southern Ocean and the Committee on Stabilization Targets for Atmospheric Greenhouse Gas Concentrations.

Raphael's co-authored book, The Encyclopedia of Weather and Climate Change: A Complete Visual Guide, received an Atmospheric Science Librarians International (ASLI) Choice Award in 2010.

== Selected bibliography ==
- Raphael, M.N., Holland, M.M., Landrum, L. et al., 2019. Links between the Amundsen Sea Low and sea ice in the Ross Sea: seasonal and interannual relationships. Climate Dynamics, 52: 2333. https://doi.org/10.1007/s00382-018-4258-4
- Raphael, M.N. and Hobbs, W., 2014. The influence of the large‐scale atmospheric circulation on Antarctic sea ice during ice advance and retreat seasons. Geophysical Research Letters, 41(14): 5037-5045.
- Fry, J. L., Graf, H.-F., Grotjahn, R., Raphael, M.N., Saunders, C., & Whitaker, R., 2010. The encyclopedia of weather and climate change: A complete visual guide. Berkeley, Calif: University of California Press.
- Raphael, M.N., 2007. The influence of atmospheric zonal wave three on Antarctic sea ice variability. Journal of Geophysical Research: Atmospheres, 112: D12.
- Raphael, M. and Holland, M., 2006. Twentieth Century Simulation of the Southern Hemisphere Climate in Coupled Models. Part I: Large Scale Circulation Variability, Climate Dynamics, 26: 217–228
- Holland, M.M and Raphael, M.N., 2006 Twentieth Century Simulation of the Southern Hemisphere Climate in Coupled Models. Part II: Sea Ice Conditions and Variability. Climate Dynamics, 26: 229–245
- Raphael, M.N., 2004. A zonal wave 3 index for the Southern Hemisphere. Geophysical Research Letters, 31
- Raphael, M.N., 2003. Impact of observed sea-ice concentration on the Southern Hemisphere extratropical atmospheric circulation in summer. J. Geophys. Res., 108 (D22): 4687
- Raphael, M.N., 2003. Recent, Large-Scale Changes in the Extratropical Southern Hemisphere Atmospheric Circulation. J. Clim., 16 (17): 2915–2924.
- Raphael, M.N., 2003. A possible influence of the tropical quasi-biennialoscillation on the variability of the extratropical circulation in the Southern Hemisphere. J. Geophys. Res., 108(D22).
