= Van Cleef Memorial Medal =

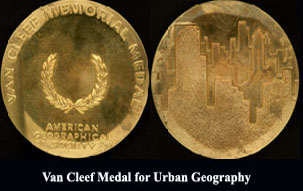

The Van Cleef Memorial Medal was established in 1970 by Dr. Van Cleef, in honor and memory of his wife, Frieda. This medal, designed by Joseph DiLorenzo is awarded by the American Geographical Society to honor “scholars who have done outstanding original work in the field of urban geography, preferable, though not necessarily in applied rather than theoretical aspects”.

== History ==
Dr. Eugene Van Cleef was a Professor Emeritus of Geography at Ohio State University. He holds the distinction of having taught the first course in urban geography at an American university. Throughout his career Van Cleef sought to apply geography to the business world. With his book, 'Trade Centers and Trade Routes', Van Cleef became the first American Geographer to publish a book on urban themes.

== Recipients ==
The following people received the award in the year specified:

- 1970: John R. Borchert
- 1974: Harold Rose
- 1985: Jacqueline Beaujeu-Garnier
- 1987: James E. Vance, Jr.
- 1999: Susan Hanson
- 2014: Edward Malecki
- 2022: Joe T. Darden

== See also ==
- List of geography awards
