= George Cressey =

American geographer (1896–1963)

George Babcock Cressey
- Born: December 15, 1896; Tiffin, Ohio
- Died: October 21, 1963 (aged 66); Syracuse, New York, U.S.
- Education: Denison University; University of Chicago; Clark University
- Awards: Davidson Gold Medal of the American Geographical Society; Phi Beta Kappa National Visiting Scholar
- Scientific career
- Fields: Geography; Geology
- Workplaces: University of Shanghai; Syracuse University
- Doctoral advisor: Rollin D. Salisbury

George Babcock Cressey (December 15, 1896 – October 21, 1963) was an American geographer, author, and academic. Born in Tiffin, Ohio, he attended Denison University and then the University of Chicago, where he received a PhD in geology. After receiving his degree, he taught at University of Shanghai and traveled widely in China. Upon his return to the United States in 1929, he completed a pioneering book on the country, China's Geographic Foundations.

In 1931, Cressey received a second PhD from Clark University in geography. He then joined the faculty of Syracuse University, where he remained for the rest of his professional career. At Syracuse, Cressey wrote on a variety of subjects, but focused on "population problems as related to the worldwide distribution of land and arable resources," and primarily studied Asia, though he traveled to 75 countries on six continents (all but Australia), over the course of his career. Cressey also served as chair of the department and helped to develop the geography graduate program at Syracuse into one of the best in the country.

In addition to his academic work, Cressey consulted for the US Department of State, the Board of Economic Warfare, and the Military Intelligence Corps during World War II. After the war, he was also an outspoken advocate of better relations with People's Republic of China and traveled widely in East Asia and the Middle East with a variety of fellowships. Cressey was also highly involved in a number of professional organizations, serving as President of the International Geographical Union and the Association for Asian Studies, and as Honorary President of the Association of American Geographers.

== Early life ==
Cressey was born in Tiffin, Ohio, on December 15, 1896. His father, Frank G. Cressey, was a Baptist minister and his mother, Frances Babcock, the first woman to graduate from the University of Chicago, taught Latin at Denison University. After high school, Cressey attended Denison University, graduating in 1919 with a B.S. He then entered the University of Chicago, where he studied under the noted geologist Rollin D. Salisbury, receiving a Master's degree in 1921 and a PhD in 1923, both in geology. His dissertation was entitled "A Study of Indiana Sand Dunes."

After receiving his degree, Cressey went to China with the American Baptist Missionary Union and took a position at University of Shanghai in Shanghai, China, teaching both geology and geography. While in China, he met Marion Chatfield, an American missionary, whom he married in 1925. The two went on to have one son and three daughters. Cressey also used his time in China to travel in East Asia, visiting Mongolia and the Ordos Desert with particular frequency. His trips were often dangerous and took him far from other Westerners; during one of his trips, in Hebei, he was beaten and robbed by a group of bandits. His travels in China covered more than 30,000 miles, and formed the basis of a book he began writing, China's Geographic Foundations: A Survey of the Land and its Peoples. Cressey finished the book shortly before leaving China and gave the manuscript to the Commercial Press in Shanghai to prepare for publication. In 1932, however, the press was bombed by the Japanese and the manuscript was lost in the ensuing fire.

== Second PhD and academic career ==
In 1929, Cressey left China, returning to the United States for a year of study at Harvard University. In 1931, he earned a second PhD, in geography, from Clark University, writing his dissertation on the Ordos Desert. The same year, Cressey joined the faculty of Syracuse University as a professor of geography and geology, and soon became chairman of the department. After the Japanese invasion of Manchuria in September 1931, Cressey's travels in Asia made him a sought-after expert and lecturer on China, and he traveled frequently, giving lectures to academic audiences and the general public. Cressey also began to reconstruct his book, China's Geographic Foundations, from his original notes, finishing it in 1934.

In China's Geographic Foundations, Cressey focused on describing the 15 geographic regions of China, but he also devoted chapters to "history, topography, climate, agriculture, and foreign trade." Writing in Political Science Quarterly, Grover Clark called the book "a clear, comprehensive and yet comprehensible description of the land and the people's relation to it." The book went on to become "the standard work in its field." Although welcomed by the Kuomintang, the book was "strongly criticized" by the Chinese Communist Party because of Cressey's judgment that China lacked the resources to quickly become a great industrial power.

While teaching at Syracuse, Cressey continued his travels, and in 1937, he visited Moscow, where he was invited to consult on the production of the Great Soviet World Atlas. After his trip to Moscow, Cressey traveled widely in the Soviet Union, and after returning to the United States he spoke of the great economic potential of the country, despite anti-Soviet sentiment. As a result, he earned "the trust and gratitude of his Soviet colleagues," allowing him access to their knowledge and resources. Cressey also spent the 1930s developing the academic offerings at Syracuse, building "one of the best Master of Arts programs in geography available in the United States."

== World War II ==
After the US entry into World War II, Cressey became a consultant to several government bodies, including the US Department of State, the Board of Economic Warfare, and the Military Intelligence Corps. Cressey also taught and lectured on Asia, for the Army's training program at Syracuse University, and lectured publicly on East Asia throughout the country. In 1943 and 1944, he served as a special representative in China through the State Department's cultural exchange program. In that capacity, Cressey worked with the National Academy of Sciences to help establish Chinese universities, and promote better relations with China.

During the war, Cressey also wrote his second book: Asia's Lands and Peoples: A Geography of One-Third the Earth and Two-Thirds its People, published in 1944. The book was aimed at the ordinary American as a general overview of Asia in light of rising American interest in the region due to the war. In the book, Cressey also entered into the debate on how to divide Asia from Europe by arguing that Europe was really only one of the six regions of Eurasia, the other five being the Soviet Union, East Asia, Southeast Asia, India, and Southwest Asia. Cressey also made the controversial argument in the book that "the key to enduring peace in eastern Asia is a strong China." The book was well received, and Dudley Stamp wrote that it had "the sure touch of the man who has been to see for himself."

== Post-war career and death ==
After the war, Cressey became chair of the newly independent Department of Geography at Syracuse, and worked to make Syracuse a top institution for the study of Asia. He brought Asian scholars and graduate students to Syracuse, and used his department's funds to send maps and books to the geography departments within Asian universities. During the years following the war, he was also active within the Association of American Geographers, International Geographical Union and the Association for Asian Studies.

During the 1950s period of McCarthyism, Cressey's interest in China and his "outspoken comments on the shortcomings of American foreign policy" led to his inclusion on various "lists of scholars suspected of sympathy with the Communists," but the accusations were baseless and Syracuse University continued to fully support him. Ironically, at the same time that Cressey was accused of communist sympathies, the Chinese government included him on its list of its capitalist enemies.

In 1951, Cressey retired as chairman of the geography department at Syracuse and became Maxwell Distinguished Professor of Geography, a newly created position. Over the next ten years, he traveled frequently and published prolifically. He also received several honors. From 1949 to 1952, he served as President of the International Geographical Union and in 1952 he was elected as a vice president, a position he held until 1956. That same year, he received the George Davidson Medal of the American Geographical Society and in 1958 he received a distinguished service award from the National Council for Geographic Education. In 1961–1962, he was a Phi Beta Kappa National Visiting Scholar and in 1962–1963 he was served as a Department of State Visiting Professor in Asia. Cressey also served as Honorary President of the Association of American Geographers in 1957 and president of the Association for Asian Studies in 1959 and 1960.

In 1955 and 1956, Cressey held a Fulbright Fellowship in Iraq and in 1957 and 1958 he served as a Smith-Mundt Professor in Lebanon. From his research and travel during these fellowships, Cressey wrote the book Crossroads: Land and Life in Southwest Asia, which was published in 1960. In the first section of the book, Cressey dealt with the general geographical features of the Middle East. The next eight chapters dealt with the specific countries of the region from Egypt to Afghanistan, creating a picture of the whole region. Cressey focused in detail on the role of natural resources for the countries of the region, concentrating particular attention on the role of water and water shortages. W. B. Fisher, writing in Geographical Review, called the book "an authoritative and compelling study," and Leonard Kasdan wrote in the American Anthropologist that the book was the "most useful single compendium of the aspects covered that exists in the literature to date."

Although he broadened his regional interests in the 1950s, Cressey remained interested in China and his "enduring concern was to restore contact between China and the United States," after the break in their relations following the Communist victory. He also promoted the study of China, hoping to educate a new generation of geographers with knowledge of China and East Asia.

Cressey died of cancer on October 21, 1963, at his home in Syracuse, New York.
