= James Vance =

James, Jamie, Jimmy, Jimmie or Jim Vance may refer to:

== Writers ==
- James E. Vance Jr. (1925–1999), American geographer
- James Vance (comics) (1953–2017), American author and playwright
- JD Vance (James David Vance, born 1984), American politician, businessman, author, and vice president of the United States

== Others ==
- James Vance (footballer) (1877–after 1897), Scottish inside left
- James "Jim" Vance, American instigator of 1863–1891 Hatfield–McCoy feud
- Jimmy Vance, Canadian World War I Air Force Cross recipient alongside Harry Yates
- Jim Vance (1942–2017), American television news anchor
- James Vance (1965–1988), American whose suicide instigated 1990 Judas Priest subliminal message trial
- Jimmie Vance, the lead male character in D. W. Griffith's 1916 film Hoodoo Ann
