= John Fraser Hart =

American geographer (1924–2024)

- Born: April 5, 1924; Staunton, Virginia, U.S.
- Died: October 14, 2024 (aged 100); Madison, Wisconsin, U.S.
- Board member of: American Association of Geographers (President, 1979–1980)
- Spouse: Meredith
- Awards: Guggenheim Fellowship; Paul P. Vouras Medal

Academic background
- Education: Emory University (BA); Northwestern University (PhD)
- Thesis: Hill Sheep Farming in Southern Scotland

Academic work
- Discipline: Geographer
- Institutions: University of Georgia (1949–1955); Indiana University (1955–1967); University of Minnesota (1967–2015)

John Fraser Hart (April 5, 1924 – October 14, 2024) was an American geographer. Over the course of his career, he published over 150 scholarly papers and over a dozen books. He taught over 50,000 university students in his 65 years of teaching from 1949 until his retirement in 2015.

== Early life and education ==
Hart was born on April 5, 1924 in Staunton, Virginia, and spent his childhood summers on his grandfather's farm. From these summer months roaming the area around the farm, he developed an early interest in the countryside. The family moved to New York City in 1933 for his father to complete a doctoral degree at Columbia University through the end of 1934. Hart described it as a difficult year for them all especially in the time of the Great Depression. Once he had completed high school, Hart began taking college classes at Hampden–Sydney College, the same place his father had begun teaching at, but they moved in 1940 in the middle of his sophomore year to Atlanta. Instead of returning to school immediately, he spent a year working to get together enough money to attend Emory University, from which he received his Bachelor of Arts degree in classical languages, Latin and Greek, in 1943.

Directly after graduating he joined the Navy to fight in WWII and spent three and a half years as a Navy intelligence officer during his Pacific Ocean tours. Aboard an aircraft carrier, one of his jobs was to spot returning aircraft in order to confirm them as allies rather than enemies. He also trained other sailors how to do the same, often using model aircraft in his teachings, models which he "midnight requisitioned" when his tour was completed. During his time at sea, he took notice of the intelligence reports he was working with and that he knew so little about geography. This led to him desiring to take classes on the geography of the Pacific, which he frequently lamented never occurred among his numerous other geography courses.

After the end of the war in 1945, Hart took several geography classes at the University of Georgia and met the head of the geography department Merle Charles Prunty who tutored him on the subject once a week. He also sent Hart to take some statistics courses because he knew that geographical knowledge needed to become more quantitative in the future. After a year of this, Hart went on to Northwestern University and studied under Malcolm Jarvis Proudfoot for his Master of Arts degree, which he completed in 1949, and then his Ph.D. in 1950 from the same university.

== Career ==
As he was completing his Ph.D., Hart was asked by Prunty to return and work as a faculty member at the University of Georgia, which he agreed to in 1949 and stayed there until 1955. Under Prunty, he worked alongside other famous geographers, including Eugene Cotton Mather and Wilbur Zelinsky. Hart especially worked with the former on a series of publications to various journals, along with an excursion through the Southern United States in 1952 as a geographical reviewing job for the International Geographical Congress. This resulted in them jointly publishing a report titled the Southeastern Excursion Guidebook, among other works. Several years later, Hart moved on to teach at Indiana University from 1955 to 1967. Afterwards, he made a final teaching position change to the University of Minnesota in 1967, where he continued to work for nearly 50 years. He retired from the University of Minnesota in 2015 at the age of 91. He did not plan on completely retiring from geographical work, however, as he noted his intention to continue progress on his next book, Fossils on the Prairie.

Hart became an executive officer for the American Association of Geographers from 1965 to 1966, before becoming an editor for the Annals of the American Association of Geographers journal from 1970 to 1975. He then became second vice-president of the organization in 1977 and was the association's president from 1979 to 1980. A collection of Hart's writing was published in the book A Love of the Land: Selected Writings of John Fraser Hart that was edited by John C. Hudson. In total during his life, as of 2015, Hart has published 15 books and has taught more than 50,000 university students. He is noted by his students and colleagues to be unique in his lack of computer use of any kind, with a secretary managing his emails from his students that are printed out and a reply typed by Hart on an electric typewriter, before being retyped as a reply email by his secretary.

== Awards and honors ==
The Meritorious Contributions award from the American Association of Geographers was given to Hart in 1969. Hart was presented, in 1971, with the Teaching of Geography at the College Level award by the National Council for Geographic Education. In 1982, Hart was named a fellow of the John Simon Guggenheim Memorial Foundation for his geographical accomplishments. He received the 1987 Southeastern Division of the American Association of Geographers (SEDAAG) Lifetime Achievement Award. In 2001, he was awarded the Paul P. Vouras Medal from the American Geographical Society. The 2005 Lifetime Achievement Honors from the American Association of Geographers was presented to Hart. The Association of American Geographers' Rural Geography Specialty Group named their annual award The John Fraser Hart Award for Research Excellence to honor Hart. The award recognizes scholars in the fields of agricultural and/or rural geography research.

== Personal life and death ==
Hart lived in Edina, Minnesota, with his wife, Meredith. He died in Madison, Wisconsin, on October 14, 2024, at the age of 100.

== Bibliography ==
=== Published books/reports ===
- — (2008). My Kind of County: Door County, Wisconsin. Columbia College Press. ISBN 978-1-930066-86-1.
- —; Ziegler, Susy S. (2008). Landscapes of Minnesota: A Geography. Minnesota Historical Society Press. ISBN 978-0-87351-591-7.
- — (2008). A Love of the Land: Selected Writings of John Fraser Hart. Columbia College Press. ISBN 978-1-930066-75-5.
- — (2003). The Changing Scale of American Agriculture. University of Virginia Press. ISBN 978-0-8139-2229-4.
- —; Rhodes, Michelle J.; Morgan, John T. (2002). The Unknown World of the Mobile Home. Johns Hopkins University Press. ISBN 978-0-8018-7583-0.
- — (1998). The American Farm: How Farming Shaped the Landscape of America. B&N Books. ISBN 978-0-7607-0614-5.
- — (1998). The Rural Landscape. Johns Hopkins University Press. ISBN 978-0-8018-5717-1.
- — (1993). The Land that Feeds Us. W. W. Norton & Company. ISBN 978-0-393-30950-8.
- — (1991). Our Changing Cities. Johns Hopkins University Press. ISBN 978-0-8018-4088-3.
- — (1976). The South. Van Nostrand Reinhold. ISBN 978-0-442-29754-1.
- —; Raitz, Karl B. (1975). Cultural Geography on Topographic Maps. Wiley. ISBN 978-0-471-70595-6.
- — (1975). The Look of the Land. Prentice Hall. ISBN 978-0-13-540534-5.
- —; Mather, Cotton; Johnson, Hildegard Binder; Matros, Ron (1975). Upper Coulee Country. Trimbelle Press.
- — (1972). Geographic Manpower: A Report on Manpower in American Geography. Association of American Geographers.
- — (1967). U.S. and Canada (Lands and peoples of the world). Ginn & Company.
- — (1967). The Southeastern United States. Van Nostrand Reinhold.
- — (1962). The United States of America – Around The World Program. Doubleday.
- — (1957). America's Farms and Ranches. Doubleday.
- — (1957). Ireland – Around The World Program. Doubleday.
- — (1955). The British Moorlands: A Problem in Land Utilization. University of Georgia Press. ISBN 978-0-8203-0026-9.
- —; Mather, Cotton (1952). Southeastern Excursion Guidebook. International Geographical Union.

=== Published papers ===
- — (March 1982). "The Highest Form of the Geographer's Art". Annals of the Association of American Geographers. 72 (1): 1–29. doi:10.1111/j.1467-8306.1982.tb01380.x.
