= Harry Yates =

Harry Yates may refer to:

- Harry Yates (footballer, born 1925) (1925–1987), English footballer for Huddersfield Town and Darlington
- Harry Yates (footballer, born 1861) (1861–1932), English footballer for Aston Villa and Walsall
- Harry Yates (RAF officer) (1896–1968), Canadian WW1 pilot
- Harry D. Yates (1903–1996), American banker and politician from New York
