= Gladys Mary Wrigley =

Geographer and editor (1885–1975)

- Born: September 14, 1885; York, England
- Died: October 9, 1975 (aged 90); New Milford, Connecticut, U.S.
- Education: University College Wales, Aberystwyth (B.A., 1907); Yale University, (PhD., 1917)
- Occupation: Geographer
- Awards: Distinguished Achievement Award, American Association of Geographers, 1951
- Scientific career
- Fields: Geography
- Institutions: American Geographical Society
- Thesis: Roads and Towns of the Central Andes
- Doctoral advisor: Isaiah Bowman, Ellsworth Huntington

Gladys Mary Wrigley (14 September 1885 – 9 October 1975) was the first woman to receive a PhD in geography in the United States of America, from Yale University in 1917. She was editor of the journal Geographical Review from 1920 to 1949, and the annual Wrigley-Fairchild prize for best article in the journal is named in her honour. She was the first recipient of an individual award from the American Association of Geographers in 1951.

== Early life and education ==
Wrigley was born in York, England, in 1885. She went to school in Yorkshire, and then studied geology at University College Wales, Aberystwyth. She was reportedly influenced by the professor of geography and zoology, H. J. Fleure, during her studies, and graduated with a B.A. in 1907. In 1911, Wrigley won a scholarship to the United States, and registered as a graduate student at Yale University, where she took courses in geography, anthropology and history.

In 1913, she registered for a PhD at Yale, under the supervision of Isaiah Bowman and Ellsworth Huntington. When she completed her thesis in 1917, this was the first doctoral dissertation by a woman in the field of geography in the United States.

== Career ==
Wrigley worked for the American Geographical Society for her whole career. She was first employed in 1915 as a research assistant to Isaiah Bowman, who was at that time the director of the society. During this time Wrigley published a number of papers in the society’s academic journal, Geographical Review.

In 1920, Wrigley was appointed editor of the Geographical Review; a post she held for nearly thirty years, and through which her influence on academic field of geography was substantial. In particular, she developed a formidable reputation for the quality of her editing. In 1951, Wrigley was the first individual to be recognized by the American Association of Geographers, when she was the recipient of the distinguished service medal. This award was collected on her behalf by her successor, Wilma Fairchild.

Over the course of her long tenure as editor, Wrigley wrote nothing for the journal, although she 'was there on every page, indeed in every line'. Much of her extensive and lively correspondence with authors, as well with Bowman, is preserved in archives of the American Geographical Society, and elsewhere. After stepping down as editor, Wrigley wrote a long essay on the practices of editing, and the practicalities of assembling a journal. Her motto for the journal was ubique (meaning 'everywhere' in Latin), and this drove her to seek out papers on diverse places, and of topical interest.

== Retirement ==
In her retirement, Wrigley lived in southern Connecticut. For a while, she shared a home with Marion Hale, an editorial assistant at the Geographical Review. Wrigley died in October 1975, aged 90, in New Milford, Connecticut.
