= Susan Hanson (geographer) =

American geographer

Susan E. Hanson
- Born: March 31, 1943 (age 83)
- Education: Middlebury College; Northwestern University
- Occupations: Professor of urban geography, author
- Years active: 1972-
- Employer: Clark University
- Organization(s): National Academy of Sciences (2000); American Academy of Arts and Sciences (2000); Transportation Research Board Division Committee chair
- Notable work: Geography, Gender, and the Workaday World. Hettner Lectures. Volume 6. Stuttgart: Franz Steiner Verlag. (2003)
- Awards: Guggenheim Fellowship 1989; American Association for the Advancement of Science fellow in 1991; Van Cleef Memorial Medal 1999; 2015 Stanley Brunn Award for Creativity in Geography; Lifetime Achievement Honors in 2003

Susan E. Hanson (born March 31, 1943) is an American geographer. She is a Distinguished University Professor Emerita in the Graduate School of Geography at Clark University. Her research has focused on gender and work, travel patterns, and feminist scholarly approaches.

== Education ==
Hanson studied as an undergraduate at Middlebury College between 1960 and 1964, subsequently working with the Peace Corps in Kenya. She studied for a PhD in Geography at Northwestern University between 1967 and 1973, moving to Uppsala, Sweden with her husband and two young children in 1970 to conduct research for her dissertation. In Uppsala, she found a data file that allowed her to sample the population and conduct the Uppsala Household Travel Survey.

== Career ==
Hanson was awarded tenure at the University at Buffalo, where she worked in the geography and sociology departments between 1972 and 1980. She moved to Clark in 1981. She is a past president of the American Association of Geographers (then known as the Association of American Geographers) and has been the editor of four geography journals: Urban Geography, Economic Geography, the Annals of the Association of American Geographers, and The Professional Geographer.

Hanson has published extensively throughout her career, writing and editing books, and by 2010 had contributed more than 70 journal articles, and many chapters in books.

Professor Emeritus at the University of Washington, Victoria Lawson has argued that Hanson's career "is an empowering example of a collage of woven-together life experiences, substantive research interests, feminist values and progressive professional practices". In 2010, Marianna Pavlovskaya wrote that Hanson "is one of the most accomplished academics in U.S. geography today".

== Honors and awards ==
Hanson was awarded a Guggenheim Fellowship in 1989, was made a fellow of the American Association for the Advancement of Science in 1991, and in 1999 received the Van Cleef Memorial Medal from the American Geographical Society, a medal conferred on scholars in the field of urban geography. In 2000, she became the first female geographer to be elected to both the National Academy of Sciences and the American Academy of Arts and Sciences.

At the 2008 Association of American Geographers conference, three panels were dedicated to honouring her contribution to the discipline, and five of the papers presented were subsequently published as a themed section of an issue of Gender, Place & Culture: A Journal of Feminist Geography. She was awarded the 2015 Stanley Brunn Award for Creativity in Geography by the American Association of Geographers, which also awarded her Lifetime Achievement Honors in 2003.

She served on the Transportation Research Board's (TRB) Executive Committee from 2019 - 2022, representing TRB as an ex officio member on the NRC Governing Board.

== Selected publications ==
=== Books ===
- Hanson, Susan; Giuliano, Genevieve, eds. (2017) [1986]. The geography of urban transportation (4th ed.). New York: Guilford Press. ISBN 978-1-59385-055-5.
- Hanson, Susan; Pratt, Geraldine (1995). Gender, work, and space. London: Routledge. ISBN 1-59385-055-7.
- Hanson, Susan, ed. (1997). Ten geographic ideas that changed the world. New Brunswick, N.J.: Rutgers University Press. ISBN 0-8135-2356-7.
- Hanson, Susan (2003). Geography, Gender, and the Workaday World. Hettner Lectures. Vol. 6. Stuttgart: Franz Steiner Verlag. ISBN 9783515083690.
- Hanson, Susan; Kwan, Mei-Po, eds. (2008). Transport: Critical Essays in Human Geography. Aldershot: Ashgate. ISBN 9780754627036.
- Aoyama, Yuko; Murphy, James T; Hanson, Susan (2011). Key Concepts in Economic Geography. London: Sage. ISBN 9781847878953.

=== Articles ===
- Monk, Janice; Hanson, Susan (1982). "On not excluding half of the human in human geography". The Professional Geographer. 34 (1): 11–23. Bibcode:1982ProfG..34...11M. doi:10.1111/j.0033-0124.1982.00011.x.
- Hanson, Susan; Pratt, Geraldine (1988). "Reconceptualizing the Links Between Home and Work in Urban Geography". Economic Geography. 64 (4): 299–321. doi:10.2307/144230. JSTOR 144230.
- Hanson, Susan; Pratt, Geraldine (1991). "Job Search and the Occupational Segregation of Women". Annals of the Association of American Geographers. 81 (2): 229–253. doi:10.1111/j.1467-8306.1991.tb01688.x.
- Pratt, Geraldine; Hanson, Susan (1994). "Geography and the construction of difference". Gender, Place & Culture. 1 (1): 5–29. doi:10.1080/09663699408721198.
