= Osborn Maitland Miller =

Scottish-American cartographer (1897–1979)

Osborn Maitland Miller (1897–1979) was a Scottish-American cartographer, surveyor and aerial photographer. A member of several expeditions himself, he also acted as adviser to other explorers. He developed several map projections, including the Bipolar Oblique Conic Conformal, the Miller Oblated Stereographic, and most notably the Miller Cylindrical in 1942.

The Maitland Glacier in Antarctica was named after Miller in 1952. He was awarded the Charles P. Daly Medal in 1962.

Miller was born in Perth in 1897, and educated at Glenalmond College and the Royal Military Academy, Woolwich, after which he served as a regular officer in the Royal Field Artillery in the First World War, being awarded the Military Cross in 1917.

Miller worked for the American Geographical Society from 1922 until 1968, and the Osborn Maitland Miller Cartographic Medal for "outstanding contributions in the field of cartography or geodesy" was established in his honour.
