= Osborn Maitland Miller Medal =

American cartography award

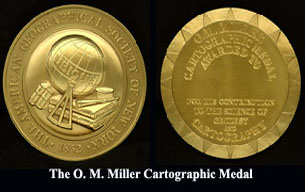

The Osborn Maitland Miller Cartographic Medal, also known as the O. M. Miller Cartographic Medal, is an award presented by the American Geographical Society (AGS) for outstanding contributions to cartography or geodesy. It was established by the AGS Council in 1968 and named after cartographer and surveyor Osborn Maitland Miller.

== History ==
The medal was established in 1968 following the retirement of Osborn Maitland Miller from the American Geographical Society after 46 years on its staff. Miller headed the Society's School of Surveying and contributed to developments in surveying, photogrammetry, aerial photography, map projections and cartographic techniques.

Miller developed the Miller cylindrical projection in 1942. The projection became one of his best-known contributions to cartography.

The medal is not awarded annually. According to the American Geographical Society, it recognizes individuals for outstanding contributions in the fields of cartography or geodesy.

== Recipients ==
The medal has been awarded irregularly since its establishment. The recipients listed by the American Geographical Society are:

- 1968: Richard Edes Harrison
- 1989: Waldo R. Tobler
- 1997: Maidarjavyn Ganzorig
- 1998: Chen Shupeng
- 1998: Arthur H. Robinson
- 2001: Mark Monmonier
- 2017: John Hanke and Brian McClendon
- 2019: Cynthia Brewer
- 2022: Virginia T. Norwood

== See also ==
- List of geography awards
- American Geographical Society
