= Hildegard Binder Johnson =

German-American geographer (1908–1993)

- Born: August 20, 1908; Berlin, Province of Brandenburg, Kingdom of Prussia, German Empire
- Died: January 18, 1993 (aged 84); Minneapolis, Minnesota, United States
- Citizenship: American
- Education: B.A. in Geography and History; Ph.D. in Geography
- Spouse: Palmer O. Johnson
- Children: 2
- Scientific career
- Fields: Geography
- Workplaces: Macalester College

Hildegard Binder Johnson (August 20, 1908 – January 18, 1993) was a German-American geographer known for her research into the German diaspora and for her work in historical geography on the midwestern United States. She founded the geography department at Macalester College and was heavily involved in geographical research in the state of Minnesota. Serving on multiple state government committees and positions in various academic societies, she was given a number of awards for her geography research, teaching activities, and environmentalism.

== Early life and education ==
Hildegard Binder Johnson was born in Berlin on August 20, 1908. She was the only child of a middle-class government official. She attended Chamisso Realgymnasium, a small selective private school for young women. Following the German academic tradition, Johnson studied at several universities. In 1929, she first studied at the University of Rostock. She then went to study at the University of Marburg and finished her undergraduate work at the University of Innsbruck. In 1933, she received her PhD from the University of Berlin. Her completed majors included Geography and History, with dual minors in English and Philosophy. The thesis she defended was on the subject of the German state of Schleswig-Holstein and what constituted its geographical boundary, along with letters from Queen Victoria and King Wilhelm that had never been studied previously.

== Career ==
In what would have a longstanding impact on the rest of her life, Johnson published a study in 1930 while still working on her doctorate that discussed the history of European colonies in Africa and concluded that they were not appropriate for permanent settlement colonies. The publication would prove negative to her career due to the highly inflammatory and threatening response from the Nazi Party to her work, who condemned and banned her study from further publication and forced existing copies to be destroyed. The only part of her study that has been recovered since is a figure that showed a map distribution of Europeans in Africa, which was the earliest such map to ever be made on the topic. This map only survived thanks to an anonymous benefactor that had it published separately in an edition of the journal Koloniale Rundschau.

After threats against her person and what she saw beginning to happen to her Jewish friends in the country, she fled to England in 1934 to become a school teacher at the Bromley Public High School for Girls. She only retained this position for a year, however, before leaving for the United States in 1935 and a better position at Mills College thanks to the help of the Friends Society. Several years later at the onset of WWII, Johnson became the editor for the geography tests given as a part of the special training program conducted by the US Army. She received her US citizenship in 1945. Afterwards, she began teaching at Macalester College in 1947 at the beginning of the G.I. Bill boom at the request of the university president Charles Turck and stayed at her position there until she retired in 1975.

While at the university, Johnson began teaching geography classes in two unrelated departments, but was able to expand the curriculum over time and involve other professors in teaching geography courses as well. Her efforts resulted in the founding of the geography department and the appointment of other faculty as a part of it. A National Science Foundation grant in the 1960s allowed her to make the Department of Geography an official professional department at the university, along with the creation of a cartography lab. She additionally acted as a visiting professor to a number of other universities and their geography departments, including those in Europe and Africa. Another speaking role she involved herself in was with non-profit and professional organizations that she spoke to about the importance of geographical knowledge and environmental ethics and conservation around the world.

Starting in 1958, Johnson helped to establish the African Studies Program that was distributed across the Twin Cities universities. Through this program, she began giving human geography courses on the KTCA television channel. She also acted as advisor for the Student Project for Amity Among Nations (SPAN) program, specifically in Germany and Uganda.

== Research ==
Johnson's geographical research focus was largely on German activity around the world during her early career. This included the diaspora of Germans to other countries, including the United States, the rest of Europe, and the extent of German missionary work in Africa. She also paid special attention to the rectangular survey system and its impact on geographical map development, alongside the spread of German settlers into the American Midwest from the time period of 1688 to just before 1900. Her focus on German nationals and other Europeans who settled in the state of Minnesota was noted by Elisabeth S. Clemens as producing one of the earliest works of historical sociology that focused on the actual history of the people involved.

From the 1960s onward, she returned to her original topic of German colonial development in Africa and focused instead on how Christian missionaries impacted the landscape of the continent and the geographical partitioning of land. A significant amount of Johnson's research attention involved maps and how they shaped cultural understanding and history by how geographical regions were represented over time and their interactions with geopolitics. In 1976, she published her third book, Order Upon the Land, that investigated how the United States Public Land System was created and how it impacted land ownership in the Midwest and protected regions such as wetlands.

In total, Johnson was involved in the publication of three books, five monographs, fifteen chapters in varying books, and 56 total academic studies.

== Associations and positions ==
Johnson was a member of a large number of professional societies, including the Association of American Geographers, the National Council for Geographic Education, the Society for the History of Discoveries, and the African Studies Association. In addition, she held a number of governmental positions, such as being elected president of the Minnesota Council for Social Studies, being a member for committees including the Minnesota Atomic Developmental Problems Committee, the Minnesota State Advisory Committee for Social Studies, the Executive Committee of the NCGE, the Steering Committee for the NSF-AAG High School Geography Project, and delegate for the Council of Learned Societies. Lastly, she also acted as main editor for the University of Minnesota's magazine, The Minnesota Geographer.

== Awards and honors ==
The first award Johnson received was the "Outstanding Contribution to Conservation Education" award from the Izaak Walton League due to her environmentalism work. In 1958, she received the Meritorious Contribution Award from the American Association of Geographers thanks to her lifetime of research on the American Middle West. The year before she retired, Macalester College honored Johnson with the "Thomas Jefferson Award for Teaching" and an honorary doctorate the following year. They also named The Hildegard Binder Johnson award after her, which is presented annually to outstanding junior geography majors. Finally, the "Award for Outstanding Achievement in German American Studies" was given to Johnson in 1992 from the Society for German-American Studies.

== Personal life ==
In 1936, she married Palmer O. Johnson, a University of Minnesota professor. The two had originally met during her single year in England where they bumped into each other at the British Museum library. They had two daughters, Gisela and Karin. Johnson died on January 18, 1993.

== Bibliography ==
=== Published books ===
- — (1963). Carta Marina: World Geography in Strassburg, 1525. Greenwood Press. ISBN 978-0-8371-7310-8.
- —; Mather, Cotton; Hart, John Fraser; Matros, Ron (1975). Upper Coulee Country. Trimbelle Press. ISBN 978-0-915738-01-4.
- — (1976). Order Upon the Land: The U.S. Rectangular Land Survey and the Upper Mississippi Country. Oxford University Press. ISBN 978-0-19-501913-1.

=== Published papers ===
- — (January 1946). "Intermarriages Between German Pioneers and Other Nationalities in Minnesota in 1860 and 1870". American Journal of Sociology. 51 (4): 299–304. doi:10.1086/219815. S2CID 143834555.
- — (March 1951). "The Location of German Immigrants in the Middle West". Annals of the Association of American Geographers. 41 (1): 1–41. doi:10.2307/2561181. JSTOR 2561181.
- — (April 1967). "The Location of Christian Missions in Africa". Geographical Review. 57 (2): 168–202. Bibcode:1967GeoRv..57..168J. doi:10.2307/213158. JSTOR 213158.
