= Bertha Becker =

Brazilian geographer (1930–2013)

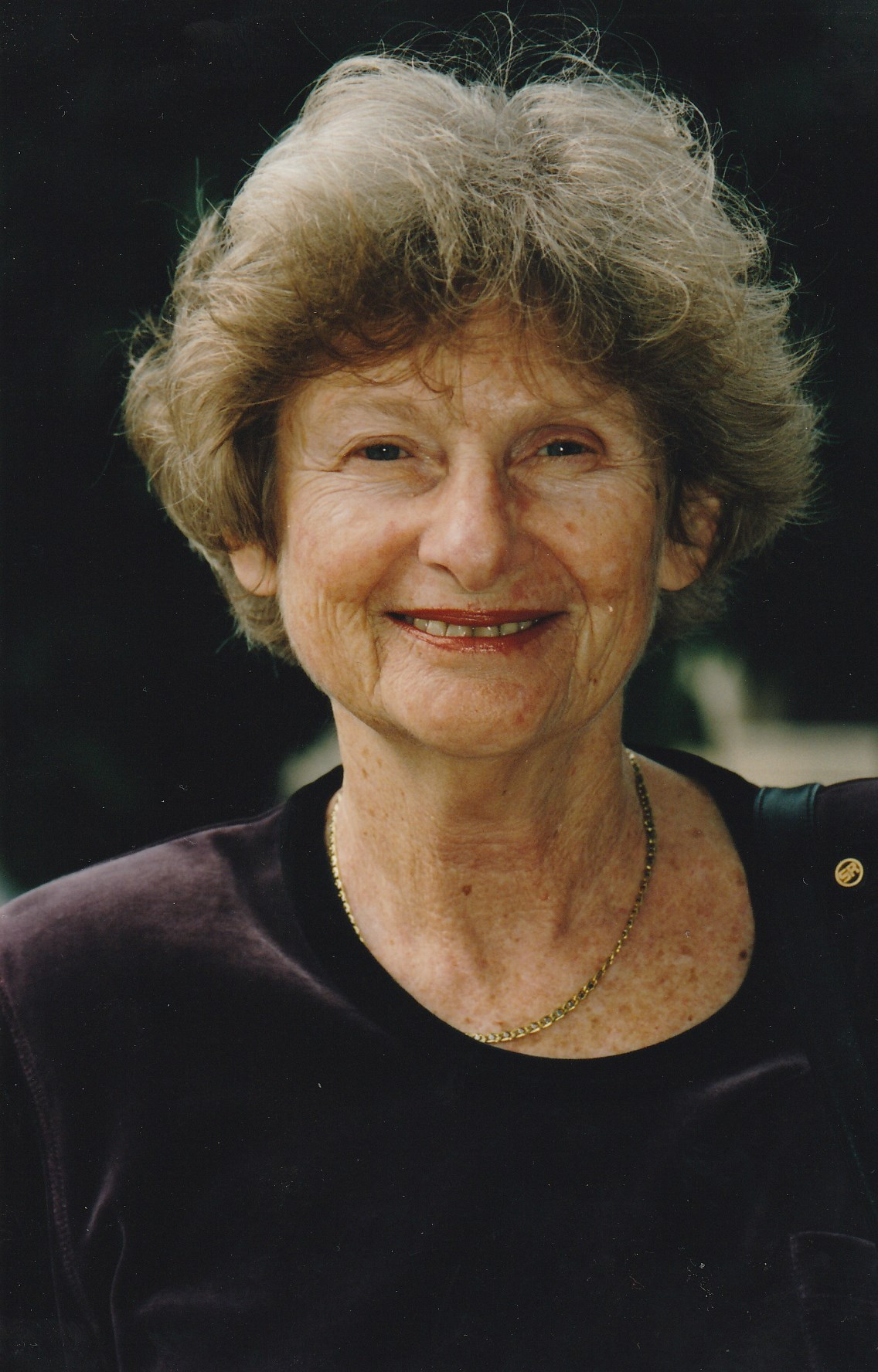
Bertha Becker

Bertha Koiffmann Becker (November 7, 1930 – July 13, 2013) was a Brazilian geographer, author and professor emeritus at the Federal University of Rio de Janeiro. She published more than 180 books, articles, and other works during her career. Much of her research dealt with issues affecting the Amazon rainforest and surrounding regions, as well as the political geography of Brazil. She helped develop new public policies for the Brazilian Ministry of Science and Technology. She spoke as a panelist at the United Nations Conference on Sustainable Development Rio+20 in 2012.

Born in Rio de Janeiro, Becker received her degrees from the University of Brazil in 1952 in geography and history. In 1970, she completed her doctorate at the Federal University of Rio de Janeiro, where she became a longtime faculty member. She also completed her post-doctoral studies in urban studies and planning at the Massachusetts Institute of Technology in the United States.

Becker served as the Vice President of the International Geographical Union from 1996 to 2000 and the Vice President of the International Advisory Group of the Pilot for the Protection of Tropical Forests from 1995 to 2005. She was awarded the David Livingstone Centenary Medal from the American Geographical Society, an honorary doctorate from the University of Lyon, and the Carlos Chagas Filho Scientific Merit award. In 2006, she had been elected a member of the Brazilian Academy of Sciences.

Bertha Becker died in Rio de Janeiro on July 13, 2013, at the age of 82.
