= List of geography awards =

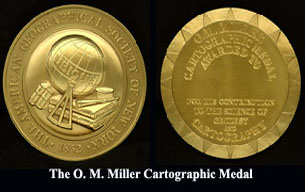
Osborn Maitland Miller Medal

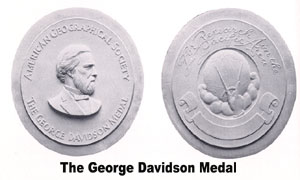
George Davidson Medal

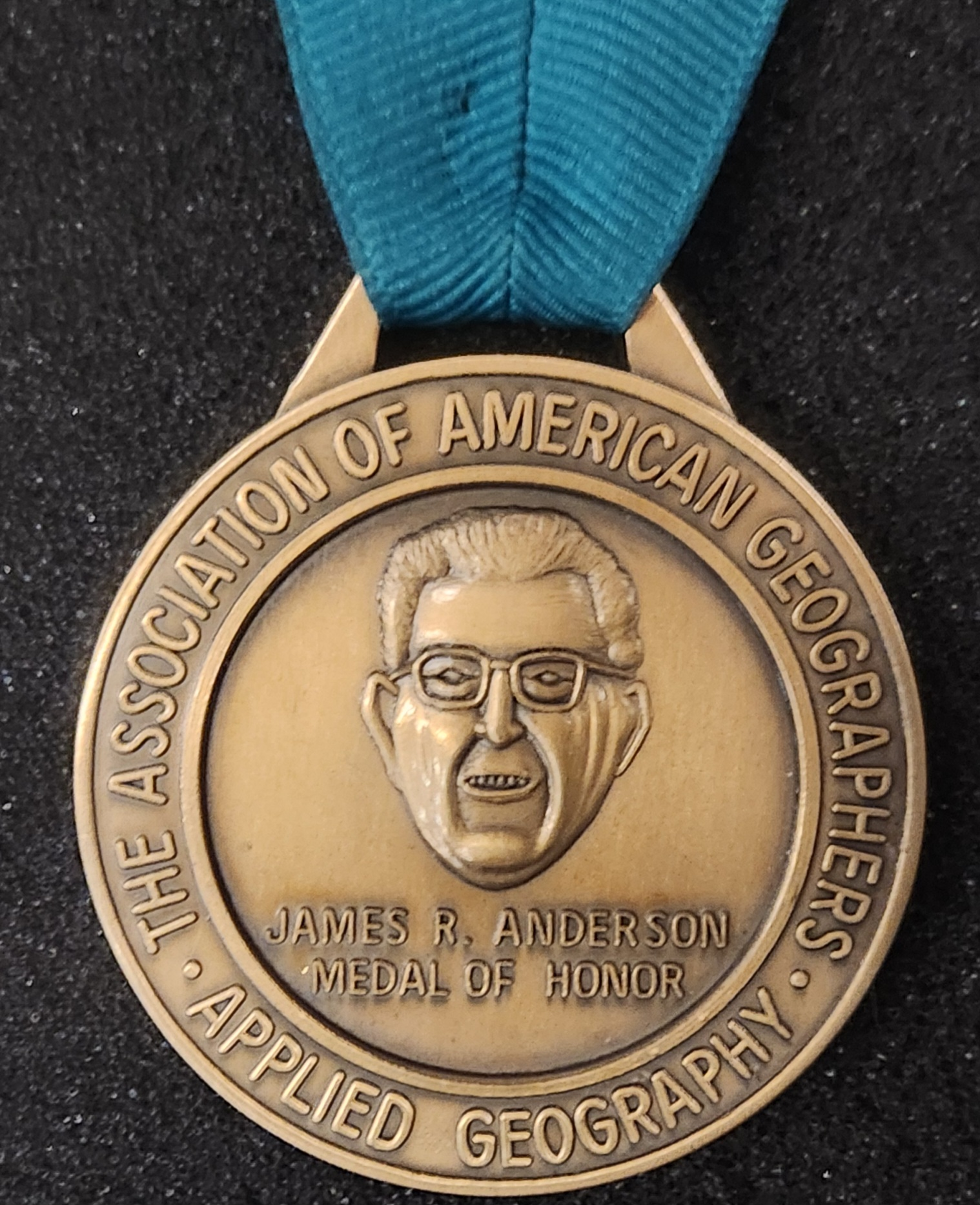
Anderson Medal of Honor in Applied Geography

This list of geography awards is an index to articles about notable awards for geography, the field of science devoted to the study of the lands, features, inhabitants, and phenomena of the Earth and planets. The list is organized by the region and country of the organization who gives the award. Awards are not necessarily limited to people from the award-giver's country.

== Canada ==
Award	Sponsor	Notes
Camsell Medal	Royal Canadian Geographical Society	Individuals who have given outstanding service to the society
Gold Medal of the Royal Canadian Geographical Society	Royal Canadian Geographical Society	Particular achievement by one or more individuals in the general field of geography or a significant national or international event
Lawrence J. Burpee Medal	Royal Canadian Geographical Society	Help make Canada better known on a national or international level, and/or contribute to general advancement of geography
Martin Bergmann Medal	Royal Canadian Geographical Society	Excellence in Arctic leadership and science
Massey Medal	Royal Canadian Geographical Society	Outstanding personal achievement in the exploration, development or description of the geography of Canada
Sir Christopher Ondaatje Medal for Exploration	Royal Canadian Geographical Society	Exploration

== Europe ==
Country	Award	Sponsor	Notes
Denmark	Hans Egede Medal	Royal Danish Geographical Society	Outstanding services to geography, principally for geographical studies and research in the Polar lands
France	Grande Médaille d'Or des Explorations	Société de Géographie	Journeys whose outcomes have enhanced geographical knowledge
France	Vautrin Lud Prize	International Festival of Geography	Outstanding achievements in the field of geography. Awarded by an international jury at the annual festival in Saint-Dié-des-Vosges
Iceland	Leif Erikson Awards	The Exploration Museum	Achievements in exploration and work in the field of exploration history
International	Carl Mannerfelt Gold Medal	International Cartographic Association	Significant contributions of an original nature to the field of cartography
Italy	Medaglia Commemorativa per la Partecipazione a Campagne di Ricerca Scientifica per il Personale impiegato in Missioni Nazionali di Ricerca di Alta Valenza Scientifica in Artide, Antartide, Campo Aerospaziale	Ministero della Difesa Ministero dell'Università e della Ricerca	
Russia	Constantine Medal	Russian Geographical Society	Explorers who had made a significant geographical discovery or to authors of outstanding publications in geography, ethnography or Russian statistics
Sweden	Anders Retzius medal	Swedish Society for Anthropology and Geography	Geographer or anthropologist; discontinued
Sweden	Vega medal	Swedish Society for Anthropology and Geography	Outstanding physical geographer

== United Kingdom ==
Award	Sponsor	Notes
Back Award	Royal Geographical Society	Applied or scientific geographical studies which make an outstanding contribution to the development of national or international public policy
Cherry Kearton Medal and Award	Royal Geographical Society	Traveller concerned with the study or practice of natural history, with a preference for those with an interest in nature photography, art or cinematography
Fuchs Medal	British Antarctic Survey	Outstanding devotion to the British Antarctic Survey's interests, beyond the call of normal duty, by men or women who are or were members of the Survey, or closely connected with its work
Founder's Medal	Royal Geographical Society	Encouragement and promotion of geographical science and discovery
Patron's Medal	Royal Geographical Society	Encouragement and promotion of geographical science and discovery
Livingstone Medal	Royal Scottish Geographical Society	Outstanding service of a humanitarian nature with a clear geographical dimension
Mungo Park Medal	Royal Scottish Geographical Society	Outstanding contributions to geographical knowledge through exploration and/or research, and/or work of a practical nature of benefit to humanity in potentially hazardous physical and/or social environments
Murchison Award	Royal Geographical Society	Publications judged to have contributed most to geographical science
Ness Award	Royal Geographical Society	Travellers, particularly those who have successfully popularised Geography and the wider understanding of our world and its environments.
Polar Medal	Monarchy of the United Kingdom	Extreme human endeavour against the appalling weather and conditions that exist in the Arctic and Antarctic
Scottish Geographical Medal	Royal Scottish Geographical Society	Conspicuous merit and a performance of world-wide repute
Victoria Medal (geography)	Royal Geographical Society	Conspicuous merit in research in geography

== United States ==
Award	Sponsor	Notes
Anderson Medal of Honor	American Association of Geographers	highest honor bestowed by the AAG Applied Geography Specialty Group
Alexander & Ilse Melamid Medal	American Geographical Society	Outstanding work on the dynamic relationship between human culture and natural resources
Charles P. Daly Medal	American Geographical Society	Valuable or distinguished geographical services or labors
Cullum Geographical Medal	American Geographical Society	Those who distinguish themselves by geographical discoveries or in the advancement of geographical science
David Livingstone Centenary Medal	American Geographical Society	Scientific achievements in the field of geography of the Southern Hemisphere
George Davidson Medal	American Geographical Society	Exceptional achievement in research for exploration in the Pacific Ocean or the lands bordering therein
Hubbard Medal	National Geographic Society	Distinction in exploration, discovery, and research
Osborn Maitland Miller Medal	American Geographical Society	Outstanding contributions in the field of cartography or geodesy
Paul P. Vouras Medal	American Geographical Society	Outstanding work in regional geography
Samuel Finley Breese Morse Medal	American Geographical Society	Achievements and pioneering in geographical research
Van Cleef Memorial Medal	American Geographical Society	Scholars who have done outstanding original work in the field of urban geography, preferable, though not necessarily in applied rather than theoretical aspects

== India ==
Award	Sponsor	Notes
Jawahar Lal Nehru Medal	National Geographical Society of India	Dr. Sundar Lal Hora, Director, Zoological Survey of India was awarded this medal for his research on Zoogeography.
Sardar Vallabh Bhai Patel Medal	National Geographical Society of India	Professor L Dudley Stamp of the University of London was awarded this medal
Madan Mohan Malviya Medal	National Geographical Society of India	Professor Shannon McCune, Head of the department of geography of the Colgate University was awarded this medal.

== See also ==
- Lists of awards
- Lists of science and technology awards

== Sources ==
- "Tidigare medaljörer" (PDF) (in Swedish). Swedish Society for Anthropology and Geography. August 2018.
