= Robert Larimore Pendleton =

American soils scientist (1890–1957)

Robert Larimore Pendleton (1890–1957) was a soils scientist. He held postings on various countries, worked for the U.S. government, and had writings published.

He was born in Minnesota. Tool manufacturing company businessman John Louis Pendleton (died April 7, 1924) was his father.

One of his postings was to Siam (now Thailand). He was a professor of geography at Johns Hopkins University. He did soil studies in Negros, Philippines. He also worked in China.

He was part of a group photographed in Thailand in 1948. In 1949, he was photographed in the Republic of Congo being carried on a tipoy. In 1950, he was awarded the David Livingstone Centenary Medal from the American Geographical Society.

George F. Carter wrote his obituary for the Geographical Review.

His dissertation was completed at California University in 1915. A collection of his papers was published by Johns Hopkins University in 1938. His photographs of agricultural development in Sawankhalok were used for a study published in 2023.

== Writings ==
- The Place of Tropical Soils in Feeding the World (1956)
- Thailand : aspects of landscape and life in 1963.
