= Economic Geography (journal) =

- Discipline: Geography
- Language: English
- Edited by: Siobhan McGrath, Carolina Castaldi, Chris Gibson, Karen Lai

Publication details
- History: 1925-present
- Publisher: Taylor & Francis on behalf of Clark University (United States)
- Frequency: 6/year
- Impact factor: 8.9 (2024)

Standard abbreviations
- ISO 4: Econ. Geogr.

Indexing
- ISSN: 0013-0095
- LCCN: gs25000119
- JSTOR: 00130095
- OCLC no.: 48533093

Links
- Journal homepage; Journal page at publisher's website; Online access; Online archive

Economic Geography is a peer-reviewed academic journal published by Taylor & Francis on behalf of Clark University. The journal was established in 1925 and is currently edited by Siobhan McGrath (Clark University), Carolina Castaldi (Utrecht University), Chris Gibson (University of Sydney), and Karen Lai (Durham University).

Rooted in the subfield of economic geography, the journal covers topics such as uneven development, global trading and investment, economic governance, financialization, innovation studies, agglomeration, marketization, the social and cultural drivers of economic and industrial change, political economy, and labor market segmentation.

According to Journal Citation Reports, the journal has a 2024 five-year impact factor of 8.4, ranking it 4th out of 173 journals in the category "Geography" and 11th out of 617 journals in the category "Economics." The 2024 impact factor is 8.9.

== Past editors ==
Past editors of the journal have included:

- Wallace Walter Atwood, 1925–1945
- W. Elmer Ekblaw, 1946–1949
- Raymond E. Murphy, 1949–1962, 1964–1969
- J.W. Birch, 1963
- Gerald Karaska, 1970–1991
- Richard Peet, 1992–1998
- Susan Hanson, 1992–1999
- David Angel, 1999–2006
- Yuko Aoyama, 2006–2014
- James T. Murphy, 2014-2025

== Aims and scope ==
The journal describes its editorial policy thusly:

Economic Geography, founded and published quarterly at Clark University since 1925, is the leading English-language journal devoted to the study of economic geography and is widely read by academics and professionals around the world . Highlighting the publication of theoretically-based empirical articles and case studies of significant theoretical trends that are taking place within the field of economic geography, the journal serves as a forum for high-quality and innovative scholarship. In keeping with the international scope and impact of this work, Economic Geography focuses upon the exciting new research ideas and analyses emerging from scholarly networks throughout the world.

Its aims and scope are further clarified:

Economic Geography is an internationally peer-reviewed journal committed to publishing original research that makes leading-edge advances within and beyond the sub-discipline of economic geography. We publish high-quality, substantive work that is theoretically rich and informed by empirical evidence that deepens our understandings of the geographical drivers and implications of economic processes, broadly considered. We welcome submissions that focus on a wide range of topics, deploy primary evidence in support of theoretically significant interventions, and contribute key insights regarding pressing economic, social, development, and environmental questions and challenges. All reviewable submissions are assessed by at least three external referees, as well as an editor, and we adhere to a rigorous peer-review process in order to ensure that only the highest quality manuscripts are published annually. Owned by Clark University since 1925, Economic Geography plays a central role in supporting the activities of the field globally both through publications and other forms of support for scholarly activities. The journal is published currently as six issues per year, in February, April, June, August, October and December.

== Overview of topics ==
In its early decades (1920s through 1950s), Economic Geography mostly published articles regarding natural resource extraction and trade statistics of various countries and regions, reflecting the more regional focus of the discipline of geography in that period. More generally, the journal also published descriptions and statistics of various industries and overviews of population trends in various areas. Beginning in the 1960s, reflecting the influence of the quantitative revolution and the emergence of the field of regional science, articles describing theoretical economic patterns and empirical analyses of economic and population phenomena began to appear. Through the 1970s, the journal continued to publish regionally-focused articles, although empirical studies remained increasingly prevalent. During the 1980s, the journal began publishing articles discussing social justice, globalization, and global flows of capital, following strains of Marxist geography that had arisen during the 1970s and which contrasted with the primarily empirical and descriptive papers it has typically published. Additionally, articles began to reflect an increased interest in studies of innovation diffusion, urbanization, and suburbanization, and the 1980s also brought several special issues dedicated to specific topics. Today, publications in the journal cover a wide range of topics that reflect the growth and diversification of the field of economic geography including: global production networks, evolutionary economic geography, feminist economic geography, labor geographies, marketization studies, financialization, urban and regional studies, and sustainability transitions. The geographical diversity of this scholarship has increased significantly in the past decade as increasing attention has been paid to economic geographies of and in the Global South.

In addition to original research, each issue published since the journal's inception typically contains reviews of scholarly books on various subjects related to economic geography.
