= Marie Price =

American geographer and international affairs expert

Marie Daly Price is an American geographer, author and specialist in international affairs. Price has been president of the American Geographical Society since 2016, the first female to hold the role. She is co-author of two textbooks on World Geography, as well as over sixty articles in peer-reviewed journals, twelve chapters in anthologies, and two other books.

== Education ==
A native Californian, Price is the daughter of Ted G. Price and Marie P. Dowd. She graduated from Thousand Oaks High School and then graduated Phi Beta Kappa from University of California, Berkeley, with an undergraduate degree in geography. In 1990, Price earned her Ph.D. in geography from Syracuse University.

== Career ==
Price took a faculty position at George Washington University in 1990, where she is now a professor of Geography and International Affairs. A recipient of the 2005 Trachtenberg Prize for Teaching, Price has held various leadership roles while at George Washington University, including Director of Latin American studies from 1999 to 2001, and chair of the Geography department.

Price's research centers around human migration, natural resource use, environmental conservation, and regional development. Her work is focused on developing strategies to addressing for the inclusion of migrants and inequality in geographic sciences. In partnership with Lisa Benton-Short, Price works on "GUM: Globalization, Urbanization, and Migration," a project that charts immigration patterns by city. She is also focused on attracting and training young geographers, including continuing colleague Joe Dymond's YouthMappers program. Price has co-authored the textbooks Globalization and Diversity: Geography of a Changing World and Diversity Amid Globalization: World Regions, Environment, Development, as well as writing for UNESCO and the United Nations.

Price took a year as a visiting scholar at the Migration Policy Institute in 2006, and she continues as a non-resident scholar.

The American Geographic Society allowed women members since its founding in 1851, and saw significant uptick in women's membership and publishing starting in 1915, Price was the Society's first female president when she took on the role in 2016. Even that presidency came after Price had been active in the Society for over two decades. Her goal is to bring more young people into Geography and to encourage, involve, and acknowledge geographers from a much more diverse range of identities.
