= David Livingstone Centenary Medal =

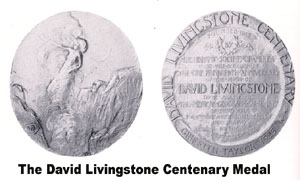

The David Livingstone Centenary Medal was established in March 1913 by the Hispanic Society of America. The establishment commemorates the 100th anniversary of David Livingstone’s birth. Designed by Gutzon Borglum, this medal is awarded by the American Geographical Society for "scientific achievements in the field of geography of the Southern Hemisphere".

== History ==
Livingstone led the Zambezi Expedition from 1858 to 1864. He returned to Africa in 1868, to Zanzibar, where he discovered Lake Victoria and the Lualaba River.

== Recipients ==
The following people received the award in the year specified:

- 1916: Sir Douglas Mawson
- 1917: Manuel Vicente Ballivian, Theodore Roosevelt
- 1918: Candido Rondon
- 1920: William Speirs Bruce, Alexander Hamilton Rice
- 1923: Griffith Taylor
- 1924: Frank Wild
- 1925: Luis Riso Patron
- 1926: Erich von Drygalski
- 1929: Richard Evelyn Byrd
- 1930: Laurence M. Gould, Jose M. Sobral
- 1931: Hjalmar Riiser-Larsen
- 1935: Lars Christensen
- 1936: Lincoln Ellsworth
- 1939: John R. Rymill
- 1945: Isaiah Bowman
- 1948: Frank Debenham
- 1950: Robert Larimore Pendleton
- 1952: Carlos Delgado de Carvalho
- 1956: George McCutchen McBride
- 1958: Paul Allman Siple
- 1960: William E. Rudolph
- 1965: Bassett Maguire
- 1966: Preston E. James
- 1968: William H. Phelps, Jr.
- 1972: Akin L. Mabogunje
- 1985: James J. Parsons
- 1987: Calvin J. Heusser
- 1988: Jane M. Soons
- 2001: Bertha Becker
- 2018: Susanna Hecht

== See also ==
- List of geography awards
