= Borchert's Epochs =

Model of urban evolution

Borchert's epochs refer to five distinct periods in the history of American urbanization and are also known as Borchert's model of urban evolution. Each epoch is characterized by the impact of a particular transport technology on the creation and differential rates of growth of American cities. This model was conceptualized by University of Minnesota geographer John R. Borchert (about) in 1967. The five epochs identified by Borchert are:

- Sail-Wagon Epoch (1790–1830), cities grow near ports and major waterways which are used for transportation; Urban areas were primarily located on Atlantic bays and estuaries and few associated riverways (Connecticut, Hudson, Delaware and Savannah) and the Chesapeake Bay system.
- Iron Horse Epoch (1830–70), characterized by impact of steam engine technology, and development of steamboats and regional railroad networks; Settlement was spreading toward the Mississippi River - steamboats and railroad facilitated convergence of networks at critical port locations in inland waterways providing access to agricultural areas on the Interior Plains. New Orleans served as a center of growth post-Civil War due to its position as a nexus of northern rail lines and steamboat port access.
- Steel Rail Epoch (1870–1920), dominated by the development of long haul railroads and a national railroad network; This epoch saw the increased access to natural resources - mineral, agriculture and timber.
- Auto-Air-Amenity Epoch (1920–70), with growth in the gasoline combustion engine; Population centers began to spread outward to form metropolitan areas despite population declines within central cities. The role of amenities during this time was to fuel the population growth in California, Arizona and Florida.
- High-Technology Epoch (1970–present), expansion in service and information sectors of the economy

Subsequent researchers (e.g., Phillips and Brunn) have proposed an extension of Borchert's model with new epochs to take into account late 20th-century developments in patterns of metropolitan growth and decline in the United States.
