= Merle Charles Prunty =

American geographer

- Born: 2 March 1917; Kansas, US
- Died: 5 October 1982 (aged 65); Athens, Clarke County, Georgia, US
- Education: Clark University
- Spouse: Eugenia Wyatt
- Scientific career
- Fields: Geography
- Workplaces: University of Georgia

Merle Charles Prunty (2 March 1917 – 5 October 1982) was an American geographer, academic and researcher.

== Early life ==
Prunty was born in Kansas, United States. He was the son of Dr. Merle C. Prunty, Sr. and Grace E. Moulton. His father was a school superintendent from Missouri. He completed his Ph.D. at Clark University in 1944.

== Career ==
Prunty founded the Department of Geography and Geology at the University of Georgia and served for 26 years as the Department Head of Geography and Geology there. In 1951, he established the MA program. In 1961, he established the PhD program, and in that year the department's building was completed and the department was split into separate Geography and Geology departments.

In 1957, he held a Guggenheim Fellowship.

== Death ==
Prunty died on 5 October 1982 in Athens, Clarke County, Georgia.

== Legacy ==
A named chair was established in Prunty's honour at the University of Georgia, the Merle C. Prunty, Jr., Professor of Geography. The position was held by James O. Wheeler from 1985 until his retirement in 1999. In 2022, it was announced that Deepak Mishra had been appointed to the position.

== See also ==
- John Fraser Hart
