= Paul P. Vouras Medal =

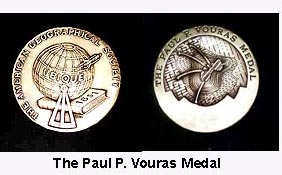

The Paul P. Vouras Medal is an award established in 1988 and given by the American Geographical Society for "outstanding work in regional geography." The award, designed by Hilary Lambert Hopper, was established by a gift from Dr. Vouras, Emeritus Professor of Geography at William Paterson University in New Jersey.

== History ==
Paul P. Vouras is renowned for writing regional works, such as his famous paper titled The changing economy of Northern Greece since World War II.

== Recipients ==
The following people received the award in the year specified:

- 1997: Deborah E. & Frank J. Popper
- 1998: Robert C. West
- 2001: John Fraser Hart
- 2019: Daniel Arreola

== See also ==
- List of geography awards
