= John R. Borchert =

American geographer and professor (1918-2001)

Doctor John R. Borchert
- Born: October 24, 1918; Chicago, Illinois, U.S.
- Died: March 30, 2001 (aged 82); Ramsey County, Minnesota, U.S.
- Title: Regents' Professor Emeritus of Geography
- Term: 1981-1989
- Spouse: Jane W. Borchert
- Children: 4
- Military career
- Allegiance: United States
- Branch: Army Air Forces
- Service years: 1942 - 1945
- Rank: Major
- Unit: Eighth Air Force
- Website: borchert.com/john

John Robert Borchert (October 24, 1918 - March 30, 2001) was an American geographer and Regents' Professor at the University of Minnesota. His most notable work, Borchert's Epochs, is still taught as a model for American Urbanization. He is the namesake for the John R. Borchert Map Library at the University of Minnesota.

== Early life and education ==
Borchert was born on October 24, 1918 in Chicago, Illinois to Ernest J.Borchert and Maude (Gorndt) Borchert. As he grew up in Crown Point, Indiana, Borchert was observant to the converging geographies within the industrial heartland. Borchert frequently traveled by train to Chicago with his father, who was a railroad postal worker. This exposure to transportation logistics gave rise to Borchert's study of mail routing in the Northeast and Midwest. He would later credit his childhood encounters, and observations of his father as some of his most formative personal and intellectual experiences.

Borchert was initially interested in pursuing a career in journalism,
