= George Davidson Medal =

Award

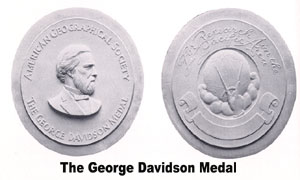

The George Davidson Medal is awarded by the American Geographical Society for the "exceptional achievement in research for exploration in the Pacific Ocean or the lands bordering therein". In 1946, the American Geographical Society received a bequest of $5000 from his daughter Ellinor Campbell Davidson to establish the medal and a research fund to honor her father. The medal was designed by American sculptor Paul Manship in 1951.

== History ==
George Davidson was a geographer and scientist noted for his work with the U.S. government exploring and charting the western United States and Alaska. Davidson was a geodist for the U.S. Coast and Geodetic Survey, working heavily in the Pacific waters. He later became a professor at the University of California. In 1907, he published The Discovery of San Francisco Bay.

== Recipients ==
Source: American Geographical Society

- 1952: George Babcock Cressey
- 1972: F. Raymond Fosberg
- 1974: Joseph Spencer
- 1975: Shinzo Kiuchi
- 1988: Hiroshi Ishida
- 1999: Hou Renzhi
- 2001: David Stoddart
- 2020: Dawn Wright

== See also ==
- List of geography awards
