= Miller cylindrical projection =

Cylindrical compromise map projection

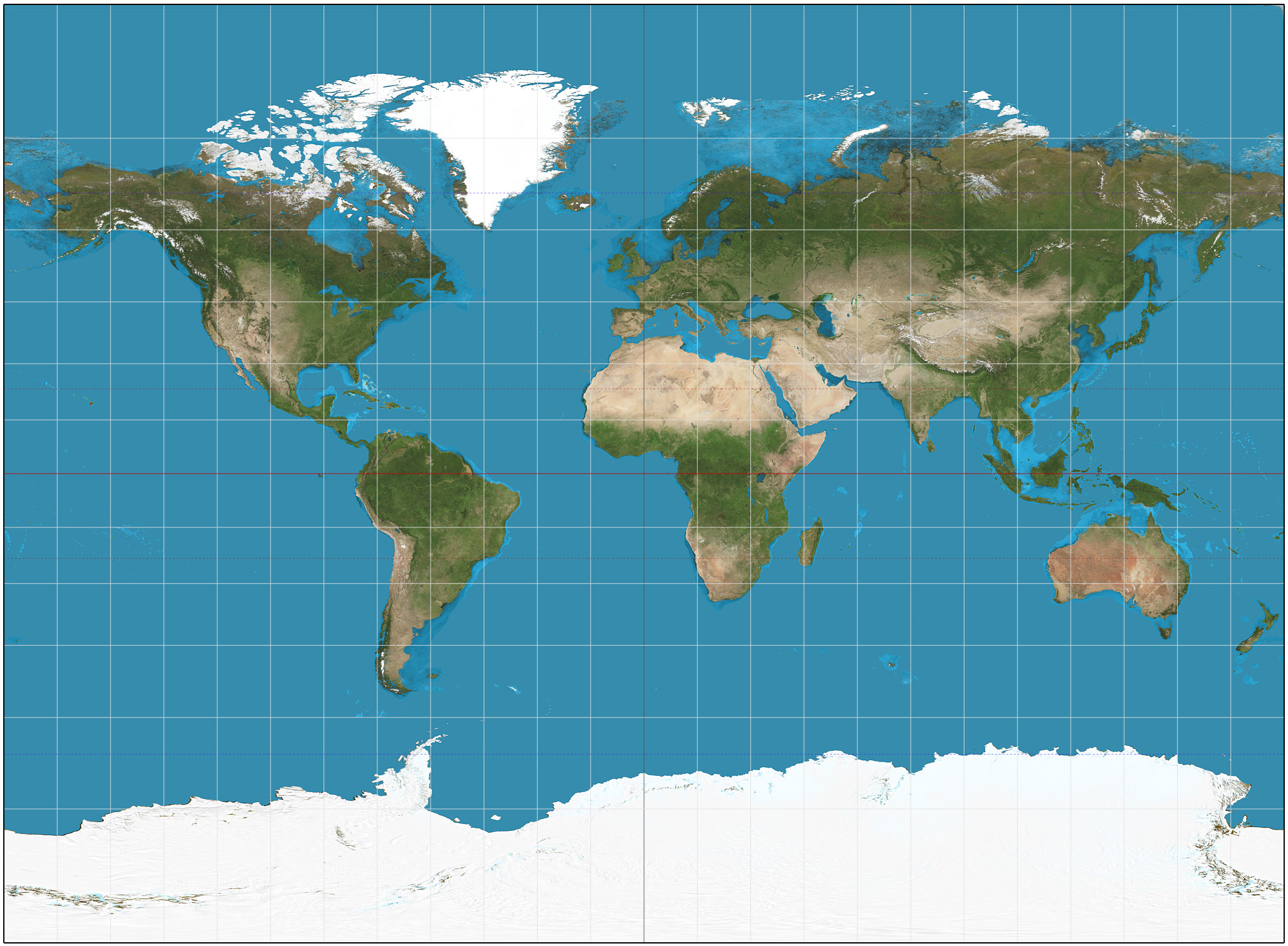
A Miller projection of the Earth.

Miller projection with 1,000 km indicatrices of distortion.

The Miller cylindrical projection is a modified Mercator projection, proposed by Osborn Maitland Miller in 1942. The latitude is scaled by a factor of 4/5, projected according to Mercator, and then the result is multiplied by 5/4 to retain scale along the equator. Hence:
$$\begin{align} x &= \lambda \\ y &= \frac{5}{4}\ln\left[\tan\left(\frac{\pi}{4} + \frac{2\varphi}{5}\right)\right] = \frac{5}{4}\sinh^{-1}\left(\tan\frac{4\varphi}{5}\right)\end{align}$$
or inversely,
$$\begin{align} \lambda &= x \\ \varphi &= \frac{5}{2}\tan^{-1}e^\frac{4 y}{5} - \frac{5\pi}{8} = \frac{5}{4}\tan^{-1}\left(\sinh\frac{4 y}{5}\right)\end{align}$$
where λ is the longitude from the central meridian of the projection, and φ is the latitude. Meridians are thus about 0.733 the length of the equator.

In GIS applications, this projection is known as: "ESRI:54003" and "+proj=mill".

Compact Miller projection is similar to Miller but spacing between parallels stops growing after 55 degrees.

In GIS applications, this projection is known as: "ESRI:54080" and "+proj=comill".

== See also ==
- List of map projections
