= Urbanization in the United States =

Urban and rural populations in the United States (1790 to 2010)

Choropleth map of urban population as percentage of U.S. states and D.C. total population in 2020

The urbanization of the United States has progressed throughout its entire history. Over the last two centuries, the United States of America has been transformed from a predominantly rural, agricultural nation into an urbanized, industrial one. This was largely due to the Industrial Revolution in the United States (and parts of Western Europe) in the late 18th and early 19th centuries and the rapid industrialization which the United States experienced as a result. In 1790, only about one out of every twenty Americans (on average) lived in urban areas (cities), but this ratio had dramatically changed to one out of four by 1870, one out of two by 1920, two out of three in the 1960s, and four out of five in the 2000s. According to the 2020 Census, approximately 265 million of 331 million Americans live in cities.

== Urbanization ==
The urbanization of the United States occurred over a period of many years, with the nation only attaining urban-majority status between 1910 and 1920. Currently, over four-fifths of the U.S. population resides in urban areas. The United States Census Bureau changed its classification and definition of urban areas in 1950 and again in 1990, and caution is thus advised when comparing urban data from different time periods.

Urbanization was fastest in the Northeastern United States, which acquired an urban majority by 1880. Some Northeastern U.S. states had already acquired an urban majority before then, including Massachusetts and Rhode Island (majority-urban by 1850), and New York (majority-urban since about 1870). The Midwestern and Western United States became urban majority in the 1910s, while the Southern United States only became urban-majority after World War II, in the 1950s.

The Western U.S. is the most urbanized part of the country today, followed closely by the Northeastern United States. The Southern U.S. experienced rapid industrialization after World War II, and is now over three-quarters urban, having almost the same urban percentage in 2010 as the Midwestern United States. Just four U.S. states (out of fifty) have a rural majority today, and even some of these states (such as Mississippi) are continuing to urbanize. Some U.S. states currently have an urban percentage around or above 90%, an urbanization rate almost unheard of a century ago.

The states of Maine and Vermont have bucked the trend towards greater urbanization which is exhibited throughout the rest of the United States. Maine's highest urban percentage ever was less than 52% (in 1950), and today less than 39% of the state's population resides in urban areas. Vermont is currently the least urban U.S. state. Its urban percentage (35.1%) is less than half of the United States average (81%). Maine and Vermont were less urban than the United States average in every U.S. census since the first one in 1790.

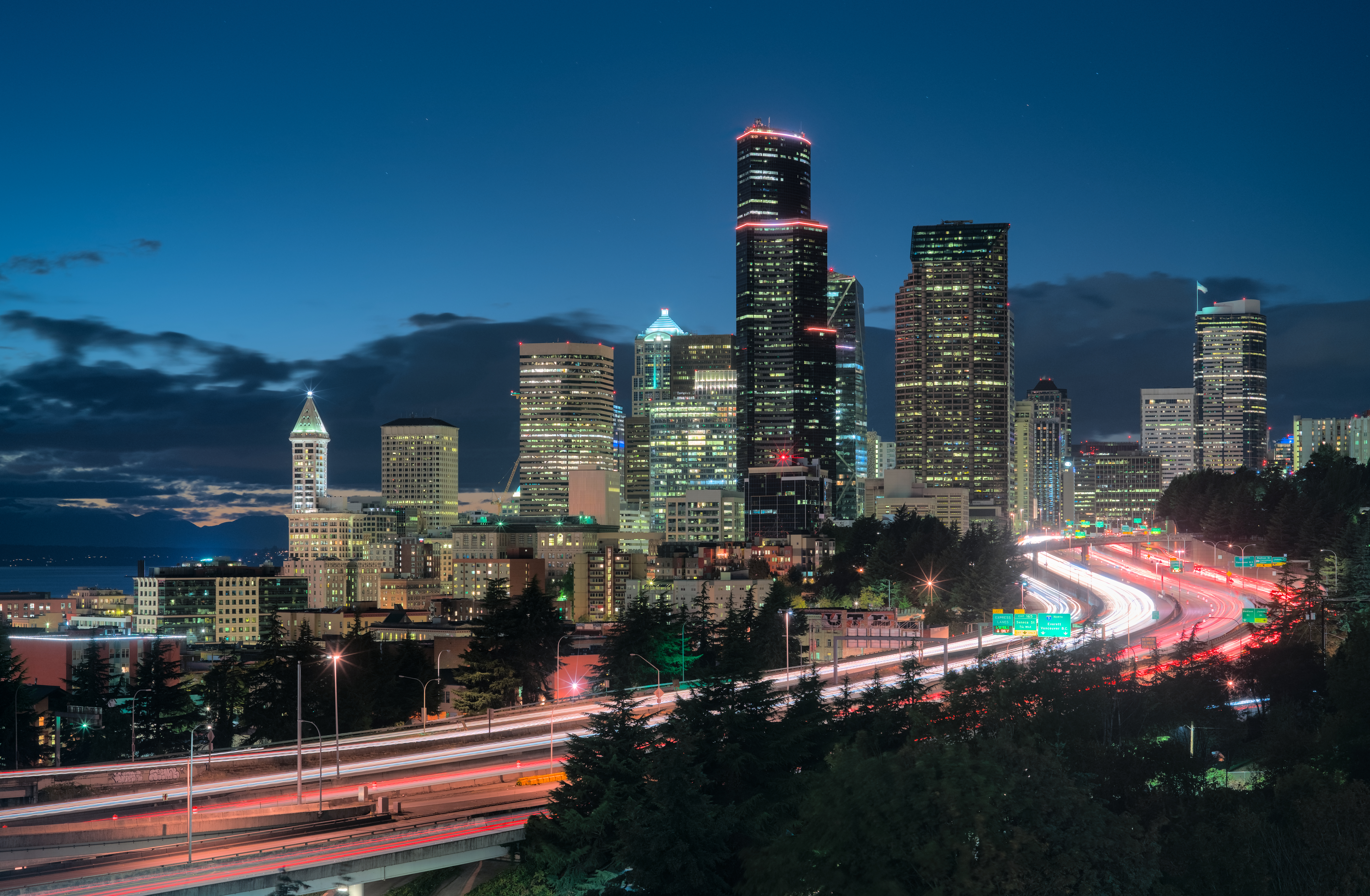
Seattle, Washington in 2018

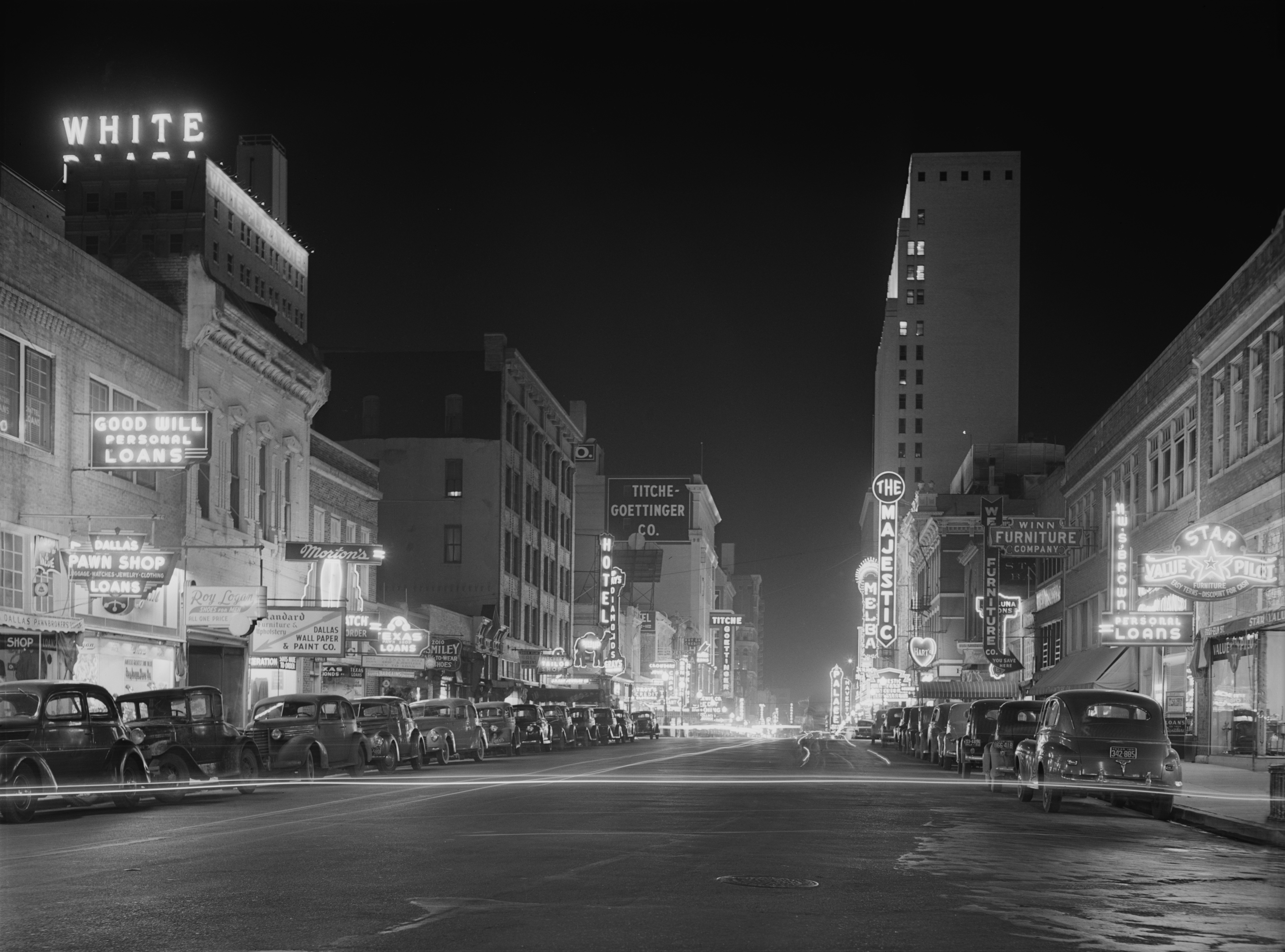
Dallas, Texas in 1942

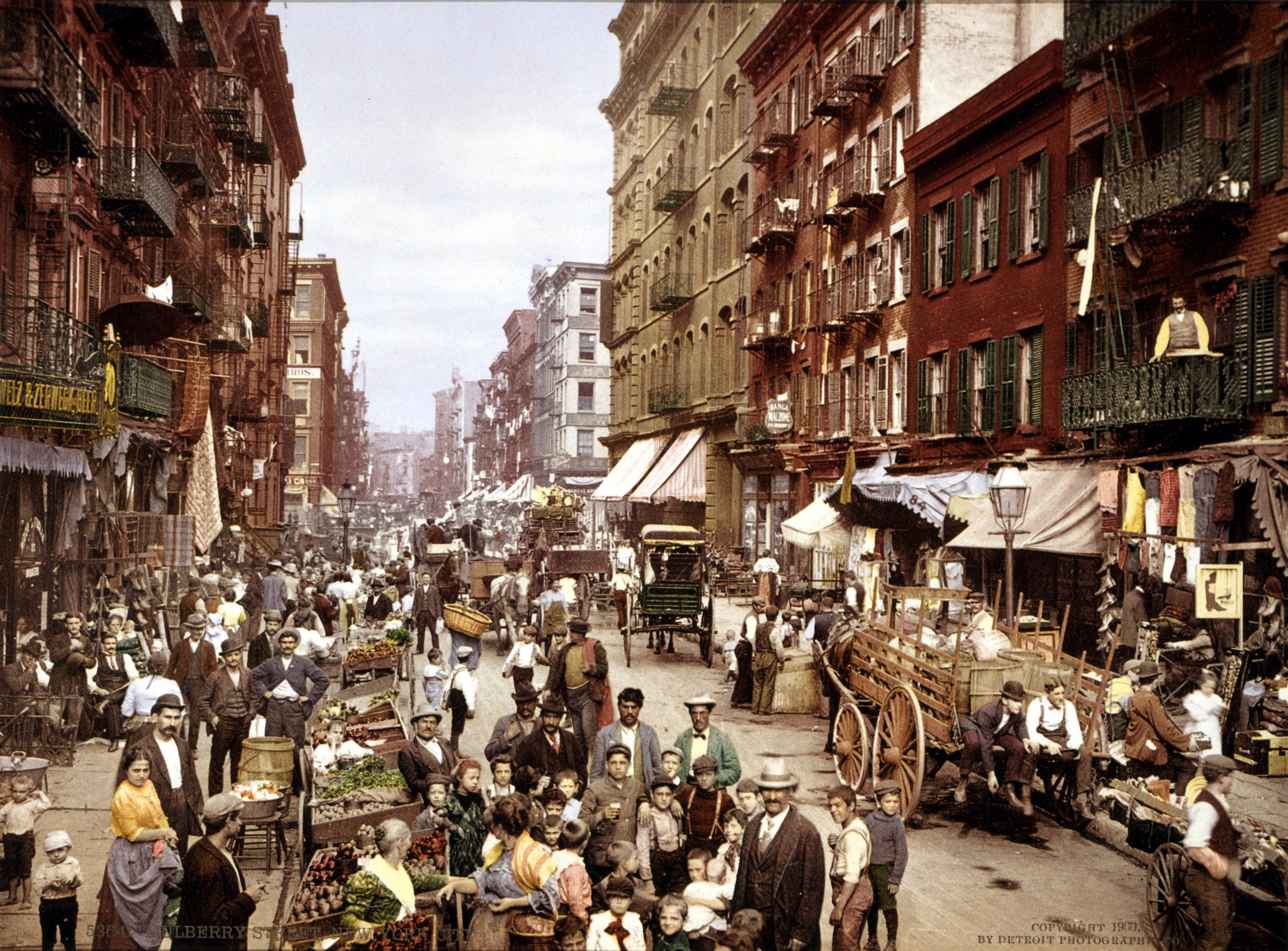
Little Italy in Lower Manhattan, New York City around 1900

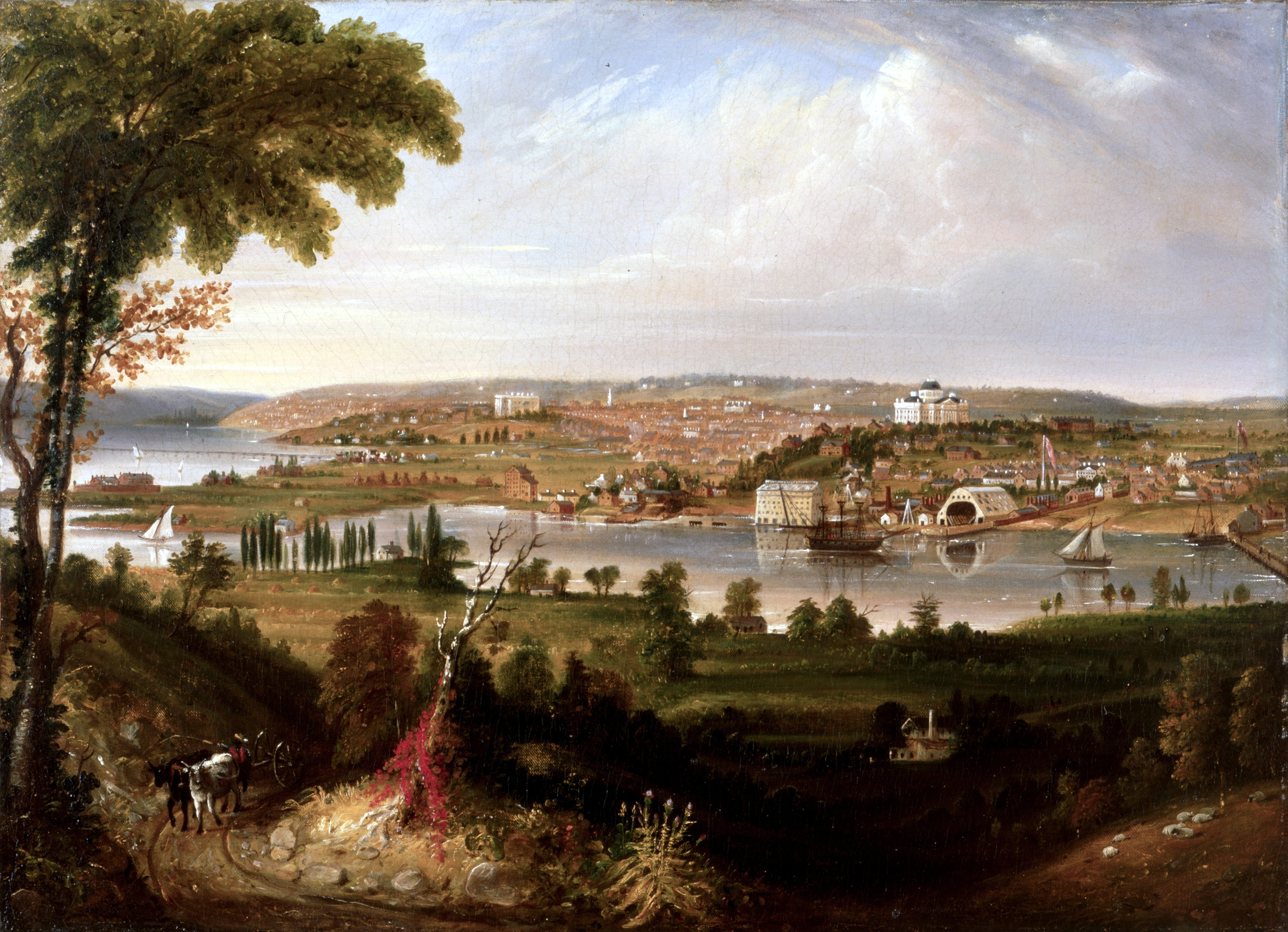
Washington, D.C. in 1833

== Historical statistics ==
The data in this table/section is all from the U.S. Census Bureau. Note that the definition of urban population has changed over time. New definitions were used for the Censuses conducted in 1900, 1950, 2000, and 2020.

The Urban Population as a Percentage of the Total Population by U.S. Region and State (1790-2020)
State/Territory	2020	2010	2000	1990	1980	1970	1960	1950	1940	1930	1920	1910	1900	1890	1880	1870	1860	1850	1840	1830	1820	1810	1800	1790
United States	80.0%	80.7%	79.0%	78.0%	73.7%	73.6%	69.9%	64.0%	56.5%	56.1%	51.2%	45.6%	39.6%	35.1%	28.2%	25.7%	19.8%	15.4%	10.8%	8.8%	7.2%	7.3%	6.1%	5.1%
Northeast	84.0%	85.0%	84.4%	84.0%	79.2%	80.5%	80.2%	79.5%	76.6%	77.6%	75.5%	71.8%	66.1%	59.0%	50.8%	44.3%	35.7%	26.9%	18.5%	14.2%	11.0%	10.9%	9.3%	8.1%
Midwest	74.3%	75.9%	74.7%	73.9%	70.5%	71.6%	68.7%	64.1%	58.4%	57.9%	52.3%	45.1%	38.6%	33.1%	24.2%	20.8%	13.9%	9.2%	3.9%	2.6%	1.1%	0.9%	0.0%	
South	75.8%	75.8%	72.8%	71.5%	66.9%	64.8%	58.5%	48.6%	36.7%	34.1%	28.1%	25.5%	18.3%	16.3%	12.2%	12.2%	9.6%	8.3%	6.7%	5.3%	4.6%	4.1%	3.0%	2.1%
West	88.9%	89.8%	88.6%	87.6%	83.9%	83.0%	77.7%	69.5%	58.5%	58.4%	51.8%	47.9%	39.9%	37.0%	30.2%	25.8%	16.0%	6.4%						
Alabama	57.7%	59.0%	55.4%	56.8%	60.0%	58.6%	54.8%	43.8%	30.2%	28.1%	21.7%	17.3%	11.9%	10.1%	5.4%	6.3%	5.1%	4.6%	2.1%	1.0%	0.0%	0.0%	0.0%	
Alaska	64.9%	66.0%	65.6%	61.0%	64.3%	56.9%	37.9%	26.6%	24.0%	13.2%	5.6%	9.5%	24.5%	0.0%	0.0%									
Arizona	89.3%	89.8%	88.2%	86.5%	83.8%	79.6%	74.5%	55.5%	34.8%	34.4%	36.1%	31.0%	15.9%	9.4%	17.3%	33.4%	0.0%							
Arkansas	55.5%	56.2%	52.5%	52.0%	51.6%	50.0%	42.8%	33.0%	22.2%	20.6%	16.6%	12.9%	8.5%	6.5%	4.6%	2.6%	0.9%	0.0%	0.0%	0.0%	0.0%	0.0%		
California	94.2%	95.0%	94.4%	93.7%	91.3%	90.9%	86.4%	80.7%	71.0%	73.3%	67.9%	61.8%	52.3%	48.6%	42.9%	37.2%	20.7%	7.4%						
Colorado	86%	86.2%	84.5%	83.8%	80.6%	78.5%	73.7%	62.7%	52.6%	50.2%	48.2%	50.3%	48.3%	45.0%	31.4%	11.9%	13.9%							
Connecticut	86.3%	88.0%	87.7%	87.0%	78.8%	78.4%	78.3%	77.6%	67.8%	70.4%	67.8%	65.6%	59.9%	50.9%	41.9%	33.0%	26.5%	16.0%	12.6%	9.4%	7.6%	6.1%	5.1%	3.0%
Delaware	82.6%	83.3%	80.1%	79.2%	70.6%	72.2%	65.6%	62.6%	52.3%	51.7%	54.2%	48.0%	46.4%	42.2%	33.4%	24.7%	18.9%	15.3%	10.7%	0.0%	0.0%	0.0%	0.0%	1.3%
(Washington, D.C.) Washington, D.C.	100.0%	100.0%	100.0%	100.0%	100.0%	100.0%	100.0%	100.0%	100.0%	100.0%	100.0%	100.0%	100.0%	100.0%	90.0%	91.6%	93.0%	93.6%	90.9%	90.1%	88.3%	85.0%	76.2%	
Florida	91.5%	91.2%	89.3%	88.0%	84.3%	81.7%	73.9%	65.5%	55.1%	51.7%	36.5%	29.1%	20.3%	19.8%	10.0%	8.1%	4.1%	0.0%	0.0%	0.0%				
(Georgia (U.S. state)) Georgia	74.1%	75.1%	71.6%	68.8%	62.4%	60.3%	55.3%	45.3%	34.4%	30.8%	25.1%	20.6%	15.6%	14.0%	9.4%	8.4%	7.1%	4.3%	3.6%	2.7%	2.2%	2.1%	3.2%	0.0%
Hawaii	86.1%	91.9%	91.5%	90.5%	86.5%	83.1%	76.5%	69.0%	62.5%	53.7%	36.1%	30.7%	25.5%											
Idaho	69.2%	70.6%	66.4%	62.2%	54.0%	54.1%	47.5%	42.9%	33.7%	29.1%	27.6%	21.5%	6.2%	0.0%	0.0%	0.0%								
Illinois	86.9%	88.5%	87.8%	86.4%	83.3%	83.2%	80.7%	77.6%	73.6%	73.9%	67.9%	61.7%	54.3%	44.9%	30.6%	23.5%	14.3%	7.6%	2.0%	0.0%	0.0%	0.0%	0.0%	
Indiana	71.2%	72.4%	70.8%	69.1%	64.2%	64.9%	62.4%	59.9%	55.1%	55.5%	50.6%	42.4%	34.3%	26.9%	19.5%	14.7%	8.6%	4.5%	1.6%	0.0%	0.0%	0.0%	0.0%	
Iowa	63.2%	64.0%	61.1%	59.4%	58.6%	57.2%	53.0%	47.7%	42.7%	39.6%	36.4%	30.6%	25.6%	21.2%	15.2%	13.1%	8.9%	5.1%	0.0%					
Kansas	72.3%	74.2%	71.4%	69.5%	66.7%	66.1%	61.0%	52.1%	41.9%	38.8%	34.8%	29.1%	22.4%	18.9%	10.5%	14.2%	9.4%							
Kentucky	58.7%	58.4%	55.8%	55.8%	50.9%	52.3%	44.5%	36.8%	29.8%	30.6%	26.2%	24.3%	21.8%	19.2%	15.2%	14.8%	10.4%	7.5%	4.0%	2.4%	1.6%	1.1%	0.0%	0.0%
Louisiana	71.5%	73.2%	72.6%	72.9%	68.6%	66.5%	63.3%	54.8%	41.5%	39.7%	34.9%	30.0%	26.5%	25.4%	25.5%	27.9%	26.1%	26.0%	29.9%	21.4%	17.7%	22.5%		
Maine	38.6%	38.7%	40.2%	42.6%	47.5%	50.8%	51.3%	51.7%	40.5%	40.3%	39.0%	35.3%	33.5%	28.1%	22.6%	21.0%	16.6%	13.5%	7.8%	3.2%	2.9%	3.1%	2.4%	0.0%
Maryland	85.6%	87.2%	86.1%	85.0%	80.3%	76.6%	72.7%	69.0%	59.3%	59.8%	60.0%	50.8%	49.8%	47.6%	40.2%	37.8%	34.0%	32.3%	24.2%	20.4%	16.3%	12.2%	7.8%	4.2%
Massachusetts	91.3%	92.0%	91.4%	90.5%	83.8%	84.6%	83.6%	84.4%	89.4%	90.2%	90.0%	89.0%	86.0%	82.0%	74.7%	66.7%	59.6%	50.7%	37.9%	31.1%	22.8%	21.3%	15.4%	13.5%
Michigan	73.5%	74.6%	74.7%	75.2%	70.7%	74.0%	73.4%	70.7%	65.7%	68.2%	61.1%	47.2%	39.3%	34.9%	24.8%	20.1%	13.3%	7.3%	4.3%	0.0%	0.0%	0.0%	0.0%	
Minnesota	71.9%	73.3%	70.9%	69.0%	66.9%	66.5%	62.2%	54.5%	49.8%	49.0%	44.1%	41.0%	34.1%	33.8%	19.1%	16.1%	9.4%	0.0%						
Mississippi	46.3%	49.3%	48.8%	49.0%	47.3%	44.5%	37.7%	27.9%	19.8%	16.9%	13.4%	11.5%	7.7%	5.4%	3.1%	4.0%	2.6%	1.8%	1.0%	2.0%	0.0%	0.0%	0.0%	
Missouri	69.5%	70.4%	69.4%	69.6%	68.1%	70.1%	66.6%	61.5%	51.8%	51.2%	46.6%	42.3%	36.3%	32.0%	25.2%	25.0%	17.2%	11.8%	4.3%	3.5%	0.0%	0.0%		
Montana	53.4%	55.9%	54.1%	56.4%	52.9%	53.4%	50.2%	43.7%	37.8%	33.7%	31.3%	35.5%	34.7%	27.1%	17.8%	15.1%								
Nebraska	73.0%	73.1%	69.8%	67.2%	62.9%	61.5%	54.3%	46.9%	39.1%	35.3%	31.3%	26.1%	23.7%	27.4%	13.6%	18.0%	0.0%							
Nevada	94.1%	94.2%	91.5%	87.4%	85.3%	80.9%	70.4%	57.2%	39.3%	37.8%	19.7%	16.3%	17.0%	33.8%	31.1%	16.4%	0.0%							
New Hampshire	58.3%	60.3%	59.3%	57.2%	52.2%	56.4%	58.3%	57.5%	57.6%	58.7%	56.5%	51.8%	46.7%	39.3%	30.0%	26.2%	22.1%	17.1%	10.0%	5.0%	3.0%	3.2%	2.9%	3.3%
New Jersey	93.8%	94.7%	94.4%	93.5%	89.0%	88.9%	88.6%	86.6%	81.6%	82.6%	79.9%	76.4%	70.6%	62.6%	54.4%	43.7%	32.7%	17.6%	10.6%	5.7%	2.7%	2.4%	0.0%	0.0%
New Mexico	74.5%	77.4%	75.0%	75.0%	72.1%	69.8%	65.9%	50.2%	33.2%	25.2%	18.0%	14.2%	14.0%	6.2%	5.5%	5.2%	5.3%	7.4%						
(New York (state)) New York	87.4%	87.9%	87.5%	87.4%	84.6%	85.7%	85.4%	85.5%	82.8%	83.6%	82.7%	78.9%	72.9%	65.1%	56.4%	50.0%	39.3%	29.2%	19.4%	14.9%	11.7%	12.7%	12.7%	11.5%
North Carolina	66.7%	66.1%	60.2%	57.8%	48.0%	45.5%	39.5%	33.7%	27.3%	25.5%	19.2%	14.4%	9.9%	7.2%	3.9%	3.4%	2.5%	2.4%	1.8%	1.4%	2.0%	0.0%	0.0%	0.0%
North Dakota	61.0%	59.9%	55.9%	53.4%	48.8%	44.3%	35.2%	26.6%	20.6%	16.6%	13.6%	11.0%	7.3%	5.6%	7.3%	0.0%								
Ohio	76.3%	77.9%	77.4%	77.5%	73.3%	75.3%	73.4%	70.2%	66.8%	67.8%	63.8%	55.9%	48.1%	41.1%	32.2%	25.6%	17.1%	12.2%	5.5%	3.9%	1.7%	1.1%	0.0%	
Oklahoma	64.6%	66.2%	65.3%	65.2%	67.3%	68.0%	62.9%	51.0%	37.6%	34.3%	26.5%	19.2%	7.4%	3.7%										
Oregon	80.5%	81.0%	78.7%	74.9%	67.9%	67.1%	62.2%	53.9%	48.8%	51.3%	49.8%	45.6%	32.2%	27.9%	14.8%	9.1%	5.5%	0.0%						
Pennsylvania	76.5%	78.7%	77.1%	76.8%	69.3%	71.5%	71.6%	70.5%	66.5%	67.8%	65.1%	60.4%	54.7%	48.6%	41.6%	37.3%	30.8%	23.6%	17.9%	15.3%	13.0%	12.8%	11.3%	10.2%
Rhode Island	91.1%	90.7%	90.9%	89.9%	87.0%	87.1%	86.4%	84.3%	91.6%	92.4%	91.9%	91.0%	88.3%	85.3%	82.0%	74.6%	63.3%	55.6%	43.8%	31.2%	23.0%	23.4%	20.8%	19.0%
South Carolina	67.9%	66.3%	60.5%	61.5%	54.1%	48.3%	41.2%	36.7%	24.5%	21.3%	17.5%	14.8%	12.8%	10.1%	7.5%	8.6%	6.9%	7.3%	5.7%	5.8%	4.9%	6.0%	5.4%	6.6%
South Dakota	57.2%	56.7%	51.9%	50.3%	46.4%	44.6%	39.3%	33.2%	24.6%	18.9%	16.0%	13.1%	10.2%	8.2%	7.3%	0.0%								
Tennessee	66.2%	66.4%	63.6%	62.7%	60.4%	59.1%	52.3%	44.1%	35.2%	34.3%	26.1%	20.2%	16.2%	13.5%	7.5%	7.5%	4.2%	2.2%	0.8%	0.8%	0.0%	0.0%	0.0%	0.0%
Texas	83.7%	84.7%	82.5%	81.2%	79.6%	79.7%	75.0%	62.7%	45.4%	41.0%	32.4%	24.1%	17.1%	15.6%	9.2%	6.7%	4.4%	3.6%						
Utah	89.8%	90.6%	88.2%	86.8%	84.4%	80.4%	74.9%	65.3%	55.5%	52.4%	48.0%	46.3%	38.1%	35.7%	23.4%	18.5%	20.5%	0.0%						
Vermont	35.1%	38.9%	38.2%	40.2%	33.8%	32.2%	38.5%	36.4%	34.3%	33.0%	31.2%	27.8%	22.1%	15.2%	10.0%	6.9%	2.0%	1.9%	0.0%	0.0%	0.0%	0.0%	0.0%	0.0%
Virginia	75.6%	75.5%	73.0%	71.5%	66.0%	63.2%	55.6%	47.0%	35.3%	32.4%	29.2%	23.1%	18.3%	17.1%	12.5%	11.9%	9.5%	8.0%	6.9%	4.8%	3.8%	3.6%	2.6%	1.8%
(Washington (state)) Washington	83.4%	84.0%	82.0%	79.9%	73.5%	73.4%	68.1%	63.2%	53.1%	56.6%	54.8%	53.0%	40.8%	35.6%	9.5%	0.0%	0.0%	0.0%						
West Virginia	44.6%	48.7%	46.1%	46.9%	36.2%	39.1%	38.2%	34.6%	28.1%	28.4%	25.2%	18.7%	13.1%	10.7%	8.7%	8.1%	5.3%	3.8%	3.5%	0.0%	0.0%	0.0%	0.0%	0.0%
Wisconsin	67.1%	70.2%	68.3%	67.3%	64.2%	65.9%	63.8%	57.9%	53.5%	52.9%	47.3%	43.0%	38.2%	33.2%	24.1%	19.6%	14.4%	9.4%	0.0%	0.0%	0.0%			
Wyoming	62.0%	64.8%	65.1%	67.1%	62.7%	60.5%	56.8%	49.8%	37.3%	31.1%	29.4%	29.6%	28.8%	34.3%	29.6%	0.0%								
Puerto Rico	91.9%	93.8%	94.4%	92.9%	66.8%	58.1%	44.2%	40.5%	30.3%	27.7%	21.8%	20.1%	14.6%^{[a]}											

AThis datum is from 1899 instead of from 1900.

== See also ==
- Borchert's Epochs
- Demographics of the United States
- Largest cities in the United States by population by decade
- List of United States cities
- List of United States cities by area
- List of United States cities by population
- Category:Timelines of cities in the United States
