= Malcolm Jarvis Proudfoot =

American geographer

Malcolm Jarvis Proudfoot (1907 - November 21, 1955) was an American geographer.

== Books ==
- Population movements in the Caribbean (Kent House, 1950)
- European refugees, 1939-52: A study in forced population movement
