= Geographical Review =

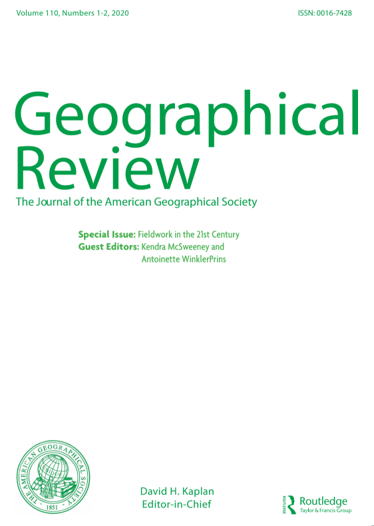
- Discipline: Geography
- Language: English
- Edited by: David H. Kaplan

Publication details
- History: 1916-present
- Publisher: Routledge on behalf of the American Geographical Society (United States)
- Frequency: Quarterly
- Impact factor: 1.636 (2018)

Standard abbreviations
- ISO 4: Geogr. Rev.

Indexing
- CODEN: GEORAD
- ISSN: 0016-7428 (print); 1931-0846 (web)
- LCCN: 17015422
- JSTOR: 00167428
- OCLC no.: 224456890

Links
- Journal homepage; online access; Online archive

The Geographical Review is a quarterly peer-reviewed academic journal published by Routledge on behalf of the American Geographical Society. It covers all aspects of geography. The editor-in-chief is David H. Kaplan (Kent State University).

== History ==
In 1852, the American Geographical Society began publishing its first academic journal, the Bulletin [and Journal] of the American Geographical Society. This publication continued through 1915, when it was succeeded by the Geographical Review under the direction of the American Geographical Society's Director Isaiah Bowman.

Influential editors include Gladys M. Wrigley, who served as editor from 1920 to 1949, and Wilma B. Fairchild who edited the journal from 1949 to 1972. Douglas McManis edited the journal from 1978 until 1995 and was credited with maintaining a legacy of high scholarly standards set by his predecessors.

== Wrigley-Fairchild Prize ==
The Wrigley-Fairchild Prize was established by the American Geographical Society in 1994 as a way to promote scholarly writing among new scholars published in the Geographical Review. The prize was given every three years to the author of the best article by an early-career scholar published in the most recent three volumes of the Geographic Review. Beginning in 2020, the Wrigley-Fairchild Prize will be awarded each year. The prize is named for previous editors Gladys M. Wrigley and Wilma B. Fairchild who edited the journal for a combined 52 years.

== Abstracting and indexing ==
The journal is abstracted and indexed in:

- Aquatic Sciences and Fisheries Abstracts
- CAB Abstracts
- Current Contents/Social and Behavioral Sciences
- EBSCO databases
- GEOBASE
- International Bibliography of the Social Sciences
- ProQuest databases
- Répertoire International de Littérature Musicale
- Scopus
- Social Sciences Citation Index

According to the Journal Citation Reports, the journal has a 2018 impact factor of 1.636.
