= Harry Yates (RAF officer) =

Canadian pilot and chiropractor

- Born: 1 August 1896; London, Ontario, Canada
- Died: April 1968 (aged 71); Winnipeg, Manitoba, Canada
- Military career
- Rank: Flight Lieutenant
- Units: Canadian Army Service Corps; Royal Naval Air Service
- Commands: No. 1 Communications Squadron
- Conflicts: First World War

Harry Alexander Yates, AFC (1 August 1896 – April 1968) was a Canadian pilot and chiropractor. He was best known for flying Lawrence of Arabia and Harry St. John Philby to Cairo, breaking a speed record for that flight.

== Early life ==
Yates was born on 1 August 1896 in London, Ontario. As a young boy he and his family moved to Toronto when his father George was offered a job with the Toronto Globe. They later moved to Ottawa, where George became private secretary to Prime Minister Robert Borden. Harry attended Ottawa Collegiate Institute and joined cadets, learning telegraphy and automobile repair. He was nicknamed "Steamboat" because of his size: he was 6 feet 1 inch (1.85 m) and 170 pounds (77 kg).

== Wartime service ==
During the First World War, Yates volunteered for the Canadian Army Service Corps in 1916 but switched to the Royal Naval Air Service after learning he was to be posted to a supply depot. He arrived in Liverpool on a troop convoy on 6 February 1917 and began basic training as a flying officer. He was among the 10 best candidates from the 65 in his training course and was sent for "phase-one" training at Vendôme. After a replacement instructor confused him with another H. Yates, he was allowed to fly solo after just over two hours of dual flight – a centre record. He underwent seven forced landings without causing any significant damage to his aircraft, which he compared to the other trainees who "had crashed up to five machines each". However, just two hours of flight time short of qualification for phase-two training, he was hospitalized for two weeks with ptomaine poisoning.

Upon being released from hospital Yates completed his phase-one training and returned to England, where he was recommended for the top pilot rating. But he was again hospitalized, this time for eight weeks at Chatham Royal Naval Hospital, ten days before graduating from training. Doctors surgically removed half of his stomach, but still gave him only six months to live and forbade him from flying. His father appealed to Prime Minister Borden on his behalf, and the flight restriction was amended to allow him to fly bombers.

Yates served as a bomber pilot with the Royal Air Force, where he achieved the rank of flight lieutenant and was assigned to No. 1 Communications Squadron. He was the second pilot chosen to fly the newly designed Handley Page (HP) bomber, and also flew thirty other types of aircraft for over 400 total hours during his career. After the armistice, he was chosen to convey delegates, government ministers, and members of the royal family from London to the Paris Peace Conference. He set a record for multi-engine flight from London to Paris in early June 1919.

== Cairo flight ==
On 20 June 1919, Yates was selected by the British Foreign Office to transport Harry St. John Philby, a Foreign Office agent and father of double agent Kim Philby, to Cairo. Philby had been commissioned to end the increasing Arab unrest in Egypt resulting from the failure of Britain to uphold the promises it had made at the Paris Peace Conferences to support Arab independence throughout much of the Middle East. Because of the danger of long-distance flying at the time (25 of 51 planes dispatched to the Middle East six months previously had never arrived, and 11 airmen had been killed en route), the use of a torpedo boat to transport Philby was considered, but it was decided that increased speed of the Handley Page (HP) bomber was worth the risk of flight. Yates and Philby took off from Lympne on 21 June, along with co-pilot Lieutenant Jimmy Vance and airmen mechanics Hand and Steadman. They were promised British ground support en route.

The plane stopped first in Paris to be refuelled by British Air Ministry ground staff, but at the next stop in Lyon (and later stops), these staff did not appear, forcing Yates and the other airmen to refuel alone. The airfield at Marseille was covered with boulders, blowing two of the plane's tires on landing, and during lunch the crew's map was stolen. They next went to Pisa, where Yates was forced to navigate based on the Leaning Tower due to the heavy cloud cover. The crew stayed up all night to overhaul the plane's engine. Cloud cover also complicated landings at Rome and Taranto, and on several occasions en route the plane nearly struck Italian mountain ranges.

The next day Yates intended to fly directly to Suda Bay, Crete, but a fuel pump malfunction forced an emergency landing in a riverbed 8 kilometres (5.0 mi) east of Aigion. Locals provided food and assistance (including lifting the aircraft on their shoulders) to repair damage to the plane, which took six hours, after which Yates flew to Athens to refuel. An engine failed shortly after taking off from Athens, requiring the crew to return and spend 10 hours siphoning and straining all of the fuel from the plane. On their second attempt, a propeller cracked in-flight and the plane's wing clipped the edge of the volcanic crater in which the crew landed at Suda Bay.

Yates was able to convince another stranded RAF pilot to relinquish a propeller for the plane. He also gained a new passenger: Colonel T. E. Lawrence, later known as Lawrence of Arabia. Lawrence had been en route to Cairo in April when his plane crashed in Rome, killing his pilots and breaking his collarbone. He had left a Roman hospital and boarded a bomber to continue his journey, but his plane too had become stranded in Crete.

Taking off three times from Suda Bay because of a maladjusted carburetor, in a process Yates described as "riding a motorcycle around the inside of a barrel", the crew headed across the Mediterranean Sea towards Sollum, on the border of Egypt and Libya. The fuel pump failed again, but rather than land and requisition a new part, Yates ordered Hand and Steadman to hand-pump the fuel for the next 450 kilometres (280 mi). An Air Ministry flying boat sent to accompany the plane tried to redirect Yates to a new course, but he was convinced that the pilot had "a monkey on his shoulder" and was misreading his compass, so he simply thumbed his nose at the flying boat and continued on his course. He was correct: the flying boat was not found until over two days later after becoming lost.

Despite the poor condition of the aircraft, Yates opted to take off for Cairo immediately after refuelling, ordering the airmen to resume hand-pumping the fuel. He was unable to fly higher than 600 metres (2,000 ft) or faster than 110 kilometres (68 mi) per hour. On approach to Cairo on 26 June, Yates could not locate the airport, reportedly because circus lights blinded him; Lawrence walked out onto the wing of the plane to be able to see the landing strip.

Yates set a record time of five days total and 36 hours in the air for the London–Cairo route. The previous record of 15.5 days had been held by British pilot Major A.S.C. MacLaren, who had been trained to fly HPs by Yates himself.

== Aftermath ==
Yates and his crew were forbidden to speak to journalists in Cairo because of the "political sensitivity of their mission", but all four were nominated for the Air Force Cross by Brigadier-General Salmon. Yates and Vance returned to their base in England, where their squadron leader had mistakenly listed them as having been killed in a crash in Marseille; this error had also been published by the Daily Mail and was later included in The Letters of T. E. Lawrence by David Garnett. Philby also wrote a book discussing the journey, in which he erroneously named the pilot "Grey". The London–Cairo flight record stood for seven years before being broken by Charles Kingsford Smith. Because of their status as "colonials", Yates and Vance were not officially recognized for their flight and returned to Canada in late 1919.

George Yates again intervened on his son's behalf with Prime Minister Borden, arguing that Harry's treatment, and that of other Canadian airmen, by RAF authorities was unjust. Borden appealed to the Canadian High Commissioner, George Halsey Perley, suggesting that in future wars Canada should have its own air force. Both Yates and Vance were eventually granted the Air Force Cross.

== Later life ==
After retiring from the RAF, Yates continued to experience stomach pain, although he credited chiropractic with giving him partial relief. He became a chiropractor in Ontario and was made the president of the Ontario chiropractic association. He also served as head of a chiropractic licensing authority and as a member of the board of governors of the Canadian Memorial Chiropractic College. He continued to hold a civilian pilot's license until 1951.

Flying to a Warbirds Association reunion in Vancouver, Yates had a heart attack between Toronto and Winnipeg. He died in a hospital in Winnipeg.

Canadian musician Tim Lawson released a song honouring Harry Yates, "Dawn's First Light (The Story of Harry Yates)", in February 2002.
