= James E. Vance Jr. =

American geographer (1925–1999)

James E. Vance Jr. (1925–1999) was an American geographer known for his contributions in historical, urban and transportation geography. His approach developed emphasized studies related to transportation and settlement relationships as well as evolution of city systems. He was a pioneer in the study of "urban morphogenesis", a term coined to explain the creation and subsequent transformation of urban form. He was a professor of geography at the University of California, Berkeley and he authored books that are considered classics in the study of geography.

== Early life ==
James E. Vance Jr., fondly known as "Jay" to students, friends and family, was from Natick, Massachusetts. He completed his doctorate degree in geography at Clark University. He married Jean Vance, also a geographer, who predeceased him in 1992. They are survived by their daughter Tiffany, who also followed the footsteps of her parents by pursuing a career in marine geography.

== Creative and academic contribution ==
=== This Scene of Man (1977) ===
This Scene of Man is known for its teachings on the history of cities in Western civilisation.

=== The Continuing City (1990) ===
In a continuation of This Scene of Man, Vance wrote another book that focuses on the roles of cities with an intent of introducing a more integrated procedure for understanding the transformation and evolution of new cities. He continued to use the term "morphogenesis" for the methods he employed.

=== The North American Railroad (1995) ===
The North American Railroad: Its Origins, Evolution and Geography is Vance's account of why and where rail lines were built in the United States and Canada.

== Death ==
He died in his home in Berkeley on August 3, 1999.
