= American Geographical Society =

Professional organization of geographers

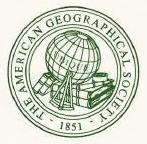
- Abbreviation: AGS
- Formation: 1851
- Headquarters: Manhattan
- Location: 121 Sixth Avenue, New York, New York, United States
- Coordinates: 40.72409780°N 74.00527430°W
- President: Marie D. Price
- Chairman: Christopher Tucker
- Chief Executive Officer: John Konarski
- Affiliations: American Council of Learned Societies
- Website: americangeo.org
- Formerly called: American Geographical and Statistical Society

The American Geographical Society (AGS) is an organization of professional geographers, founded in 1851 in New York City. Most fellows of the society are Americans, but among them have always been a significant number of fellows from around the world. The society encourages activities that expands geographical knowledge, and the interpretation of that knowledge so that it can be useful to geographers and other disciplines, especially in a policymaking environment. It is the oldest nationwide geographical organization in the United States. Over the century and a half of its existence, the AGS has been especially interested in three regions: the Arctic, the Antarctic, and Latin America. A signature characteristic of the AGS-sponsored exploration was the requirement that its expeditions produce tangible scientific results.

== History ==
The AGS was founded by 31 New Yorkers, who were wealthy philanthropists, historians, publishers and editors. Among them were George Folsom, Henry Grinnell, Henry Varnum Poor, Hiram Barney, Alexander Isaac Cotheal, Henry Evelyn Pierrepont, S. De Witt Bloodgood, John Romeyn Brodhead, Joshua Leavitt and Archibald Russell.

The founders held a joint interest in polar exploration, and readily organized the AGS upon the request of Lady Franklin to search for her husband and his voyagers lost in the Polar Franklin Expedition. In September 1851, the committee formed to draft a constitution. On October 9, this committee undertook the constitution at a meeting held in the Geographical and Statistical Library in New York City. The society was not fully established until December 7, 1854, under a charter granted by legislator of the State of New York'

The society was primarily named the "American Geographical and Statistical Society"; possibly due to the fact that the organizational meeting was held in New York University's "Geographical and Statistical Library". In 1871, the AGS amended its Charter and dropped "and Statistical" from its title, thus becoming the "American Geographical Society".

The society's first and most ambitious attempt to influence governmental policy was made early in 1862. On January 7, a special committee was appointed to devise a taxation system to correspond with the present state of public affairs. The committee prepared a report which was printed and distributed to members of the society, members of Congress, and other public functionaries throughout the United States. The society also began to integrate globally within the international geographical community, sending a council member to attend the first International Geographical Congress.

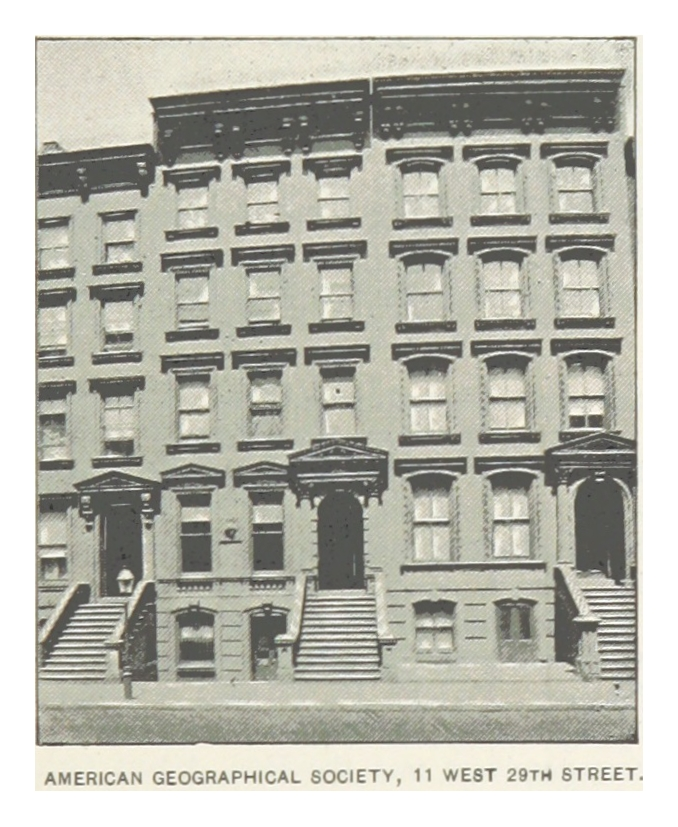
11 West 29th Street, Manhattan

During World War I, the interdisciplinary, government-sponsored "Inquiry" in preparation for the Paris Peace Conference was led by the AGS and headquartered in the society's building in New York. After the Armistice of 11 November 1918, President Woodrow Wilson and the American Delegation sailed for France. With them sailed AGS Director Isaiah Bowman and three truckloads of geographical information compiled by Bowman and 150 geographers, historians, economists, statisticians, ethnographers, political scientists, and scholars of international law.

The AGS was instrumental in providing technical and professional support to the many polar expeditions of Louise Arner Boyd during the 1930s. Her long-time friendship with geographer and future Johns Hopkins University president, Isaiah Bowman, helped inspire in Louise a lifelong interest in geography and photography, which proved invaluable on all her expeditions. The AGS published her book, The Fiord Region of East Greenland, and also sent her in 1934 as the organization's delegate to the International Geographical Congress in Warsaw, Poland. During this trip Louise traveled throughout Poland with local experts, documenting the life, work and customs of the rural people, a population that would undergo drastic changes during and after the Second World War. The AGS published her second book, Rural Poland.

After World War I, the society undertook an ambitious effort to map "Hispanic America" as part of the international effort to map the entire world at 1:1,000,000. The venture lasted from 1920 to 1945 and eventually produced 107 map sheets at a total cost of more than one-half million dollars, mostly in private donations.

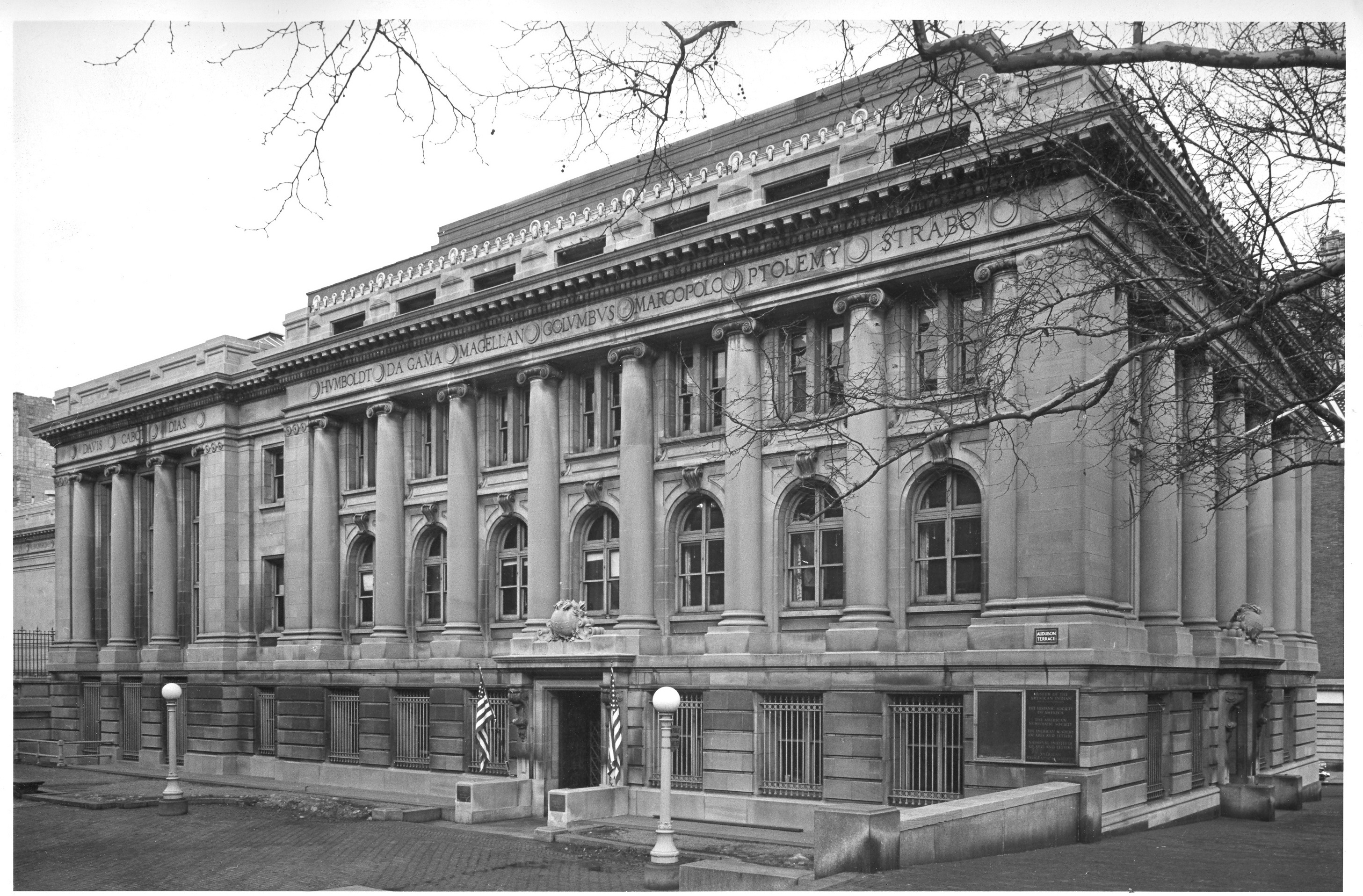
Broadway at 156th Street

During World War II, the society assisted more than forty agencies of the U.S. government. Contributing ethnographic data to U.S. Military Intelligence in the efforts to defuse Axis strongholds in Eastern Europe.

The headquarters of the American Geographical Society were initially established at New York University in Washington Square. The university's chapel was used for some of the society's lectures and the AGS remained at this location until 1858. Later, two rooms located in Clinton Hall, formerly the Astor Opera House, became the society's next home in December 1858. In 1866, the American Geographical Society moved to Cooper Union at Cooper Square on Ninth Street, where it remained for ten years. In 1911, the AGS moved to 3755 Broadway at 156th Street. This three story building was built on land donated by Archer Milton Huntington's mother and designed by Charles Pratt Huntington. Audubon Terrace became the society's most prominent home and was visited by many scholars and dignitaries, including President Woodrow Wilson.

After numerous relocations across New York City, the AGS is currently housed at 121 Sixth Avenue, Manhattan.

The AGS was awarded the Scottish Geographical Medal by the Royal Scottish Geographical Society in 2001.

== Past presidents ==
The society has possessed a diverse line of presidents, including a New York City Mayor and The New York Times Editor. The first president was George Bancroft, an American historian and statesman who was prominent in the promotion of secondary education and public policy.

The society's presidents have included:

1. George Bancroft (1852–1854)
2. Francis L. Hawks (1854–1861)
3. Henry Grinnell (1861–1864)
4. Charles Patrick Daly (1864–1899)
5. Seth Low (1900–1901)
6. Robert Edwin Peary (1903–1907)
7. Archer M. Huntington (1907–1911, Honorary President 1911–1916)
8. John Greenough (1916–1925, Honorary President 1925–1934)
9. John Huston Finley (1925–1934, Honorary President 1934–1940)
10. Roland L. Redmond (1934–1947)
11. Richard Upjohn Light (1947–1957)
12. Walter A. Wood (1957–1967)
13. Serge A. Korff (1967–1972)
14. William A. Hance (1972–1973)
15. Richard H. Nolte (1973–1980)
16. John E. Gould (1980–1996)
17. Donald J. Lloyd-Jones (1996–1999)
18. William P. Doyle (2000–2002)
19. Jerome E. Dobson (2002–2016)
20. Marie D. Price (2016–present)

Other leaders

- Isaiah Bowman (Director 1915 to 1935)
- John K. Wright (Director 1938–1949)

== Geographical education ==
=== Publications ===
The AGS publishes a peer-reviewed, scholarly periodical devoted exclusively to geography titled Geographical Review. The journal contains articles on all aspects of current topical and regional issues within geography. Additionally, the society publishes a forty-page, full-color journal titled Focus' in Geography, which includes articles on a variety of topics aimed towards a broader audience of students, teachers, administrators and parents. Focus is edited and written by academic and professional geographers and includes theme sections; maps and photos; and special country issues. Ubique, the society's thrice-yearly letter newsletter, serves as a vehicle for communication of Society news and events. Ubique is sent to all Fellows, Associates, Medalists, Geography Department Heads, and Galileo Circle Members.

The AGS also provides geographers to speak to the media on a variety of issues critical to human, environmental, political, and economic development. The AGS Writers Circle produces Commentary and Op Ed pieces about issues of importance to global society, such as geopolitics, spatial technologies (e.g. Geographic Information Sciences (GIS) and Spatial Modeling), water management, global climate change, globalization, urban growth and change, and social issues.

=== Expeditions ===
To contribute to geographical understanding, the AGS arranges an array of expeditions to various locations.

The expeditions the society has been connected with fall into three categories:

- expeditions organized and led by members of the society's staff
- other expeditions in which members of the AGS staff took part
- expeditions under the society's auspices or assisted by the institution in any other ways

Most notably:

A Transcontinental Excursion was arranged and executed by the AGS in 1912. The idea for this excursion was generated by Professor William Morris Davis who, in 1908 "tried the unique experiment of conducting a geographical excursion in Europe, open to students of European and American universities". The excursion promoted the acquaintance of European geographers with Americans.

Currently, the AGS sends teams of scholars to improve U.S. understanding of foreign lands and peoples, in order to reduce international misunderstandings and improve humanitarian assistance in case of natural disasters, technological accidents, terrorist acts and war. The organization aims to build a multi-scale Geographic information system (GIS) for each world region, collect unclassified GIS data, conduct participatory GIS, train a new caliber of regional experts, disseminate GIS data freely to the public and publish the results in popular media and scholarly journal. Each expedition is titled a Bowman Expedition, in honor of past AGS Director, Isaiah Bowman.

Others include:

- Isaac Israel Hayes' Arctic Expedition to reach the North Pole
- Robert Peary's Polar Expeditions
- The Powell Expedition – exploration of the Grand Canyon

=== Archives ===
The AGS archive contains field notes, original maps, sketches, photographs, journals, artifacts, correspondence, expedition flags and memorabilia, field equipment, telegrams, press clippings, event programs, radio logs, meeting records, and many other documents and artifacts. In 2011 the AGS of NY and the AGS Library at UW Milwaukee began a project to organize, rehouse and create the finding aid for the society archives.

The AGS Library was transferred to the University of Wisconsin–Milwaukee in 1978. It holds a large collection of material from Latin American and the Polar Regions and contains over one-million items, some dating back to the 15th century.

=== The AGS Travel Program ===
Since 1984, the AGS have organized a Travel Program, sponsoring in excess of 250 educational trips for the general public. The AGS Travel Program lecturers are professional geographers, fellows of the society and authorities on the regions traveled. Trips are conducted through various means of travel, including private jet and ship.

== Fliers & Explorers Globe ==
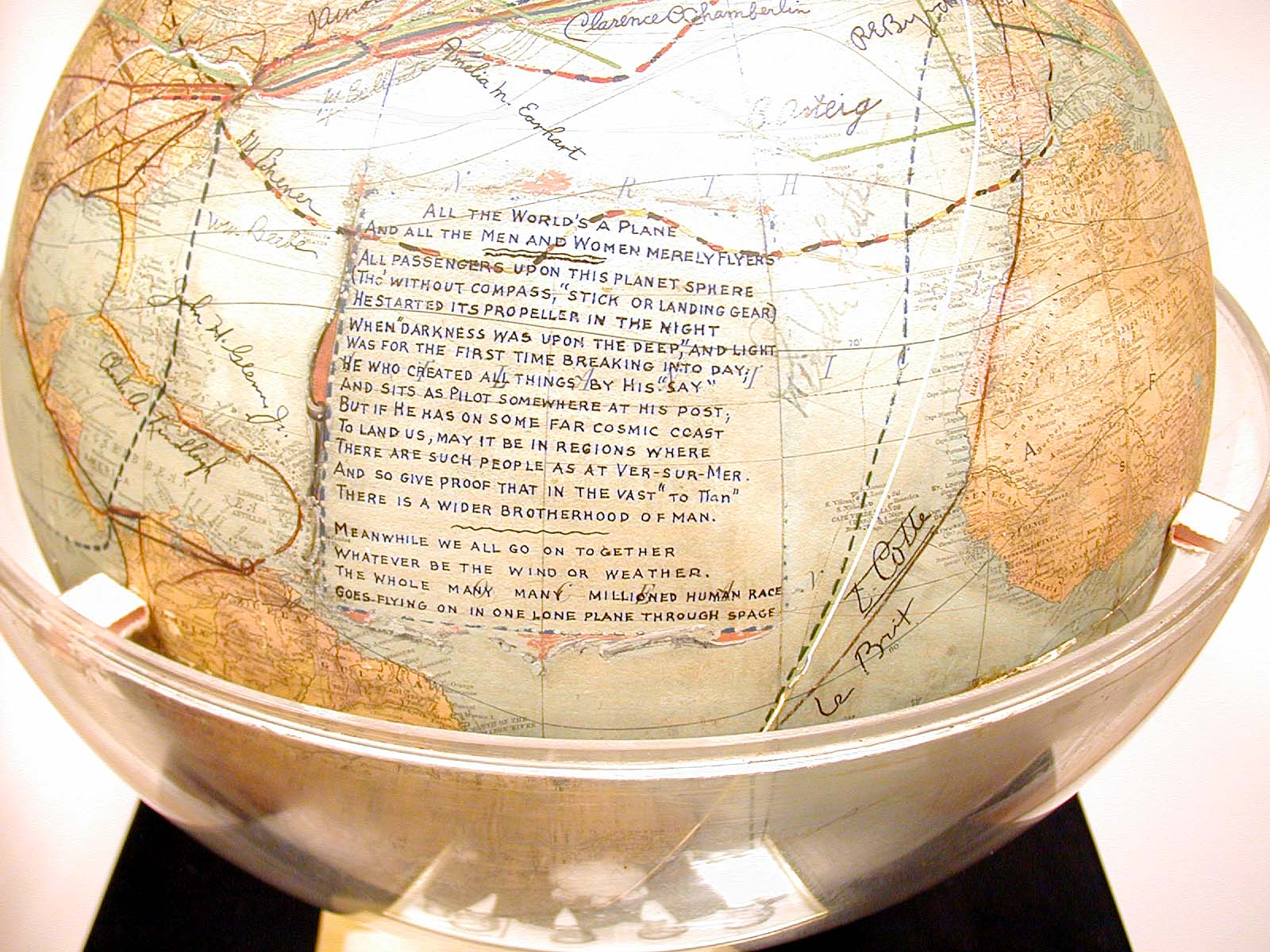
Fliers' & Explorers' Globe

The American Geographical Society acquired its Fliers & Explorers Globe in 1929 as a gift from AGS President John H. Finley. In his position as editor-in-chief of The New York Times, Finley invited early heroes of exploration and aviation to draw their routes and sign their names on his 18-inch globe. The society has continued the custom and has created a symbol of humanity's drive to explore the universe.

Signers of the Fliers & Explorers Globe over the years are men and women who have explored certain places on earth for the first time in recorded history, reached new extremes of height or depth, pioneered new means of travel, or set aviation records. Among them are such people as Charles Lindbergh, Amelia Earhart, Sir Edmund Hillary, William Beebe, Louise Arner Boyd and the Apollo 13 astronauts.

Signers of the Fliers & Explorers Globe are proposed by AGS' Exploration Committee for approval by the AGS Honors Committee and confirmation by the AGS Council.

At the 2026 signing event, AGS announced a partnership with Arizona State University (ASU) to share stewardship of the Globe for ten years. Beginning in 2027, the Globe and two Legacy Globes will be housed on ASU's Tempe campus. Geospatial specialists from ASU's School of Geographical Sciences and Urban Planning and the Map and Geospatial Hub plan to build a digital twin of the Globe and a 3D interactive web portal to make its history publicly accessible.

== Medals and awards ==
The AGS presents a number of awards and medals:

- Honorary Fellowships
- The Alexander & Ilse Melamid Medal
- Cullum Geographical Medal
- Charles P. Daly Medal
- Samuel Finley Breese Morse Medal
- David Livingstone Centenary Medal
- George Davidson Medal
- Osborn Maitland Miller Medal
- Van Cleef Memorial Medal
- Paul P. Vouras Medal
- John E. Gould Medal
- Wrigley-Fairchild Prize

== See also ==
- Royal Geographical Society
