= WGB =

WGB may be:

- West Grand Bahama, a region of The Bahamas
- William Garden Blaikie (1820–1899), Scottish cleric, writer and reformer
- William Gates Building, Cambridge, England
- Wonderful Grand Band, a Canadian music and comedy group
- World Geography Bowl, an American quiz tournament

== See also ==
- WGBS (disambiguation)
- WGP (disambiguation)
- William Jennings Bryan (1860–1925), American politician
