= WGPS =

WGPS may refer to:

- WGPS-LD, a television station in Florida, United States
- WVRL, a radio station in North Carolina, United States (formerly WGPS)

== See also ==
- WGP (disambiguation)
