= World Geography Bowl =

Geography quiz bowl tournament

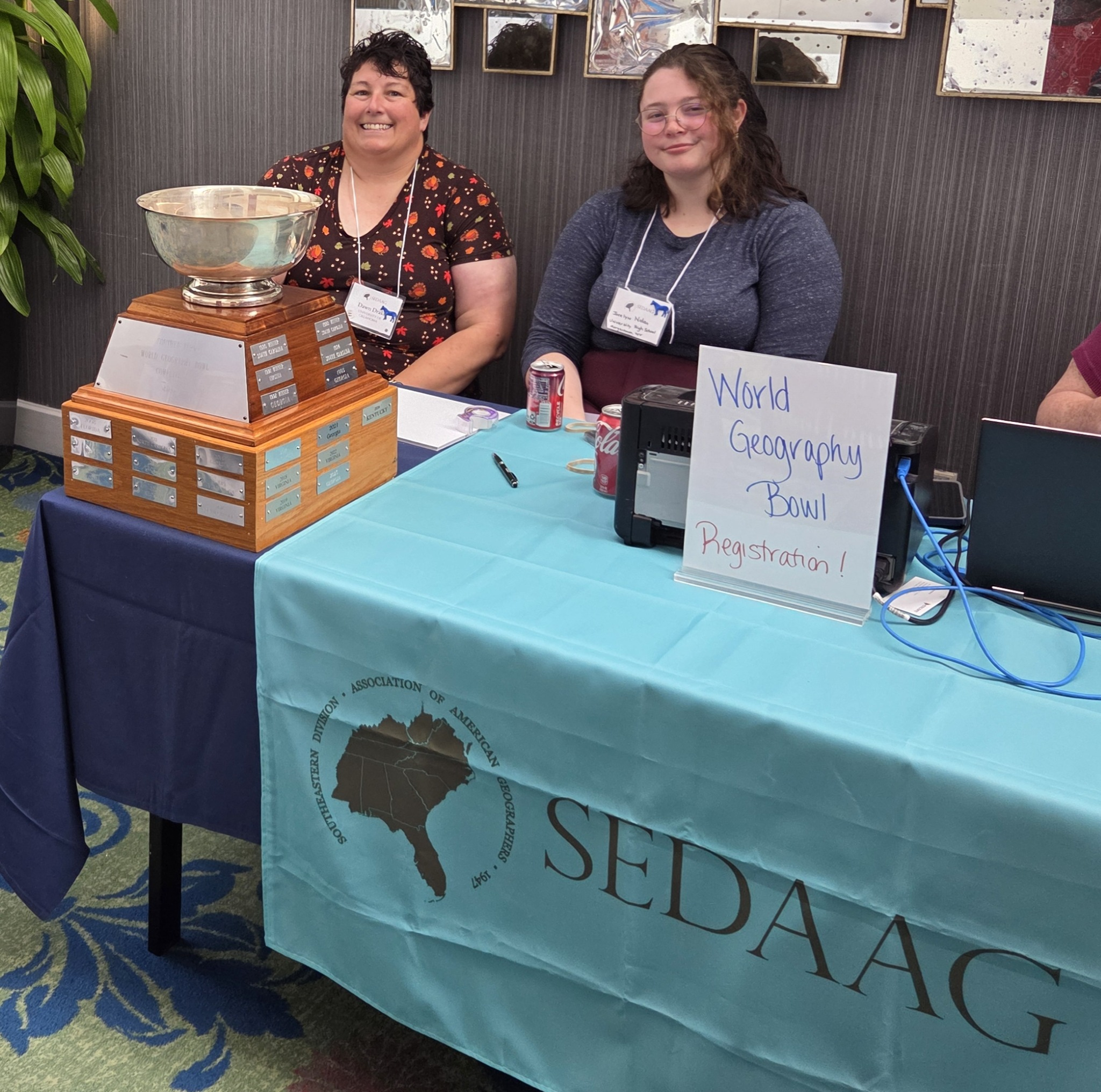
Dawn Drake (left), director of the SEDAAG World Geography Bowl and Jocelyn Nolan (right) at the 2025 SEDAAG regional World Geography Bowl registration table

The World Geography Bowl (WGB) is a quiz bowl tournament focused on testing participants' knowledge of geography. The first WGB was held between various students from North Carolina universities in the United States in 1987. The first tournament was held at the American Association of Geographers (AAG) annual meeting in 1993. Most of the regional divisions of the AAG include a WGB at their annual meetings. Participants include graduate and undergraduate geography students, and national participants are selected from the regional divisions of the AAG, often through performing well in a regional divisions geography bowl.

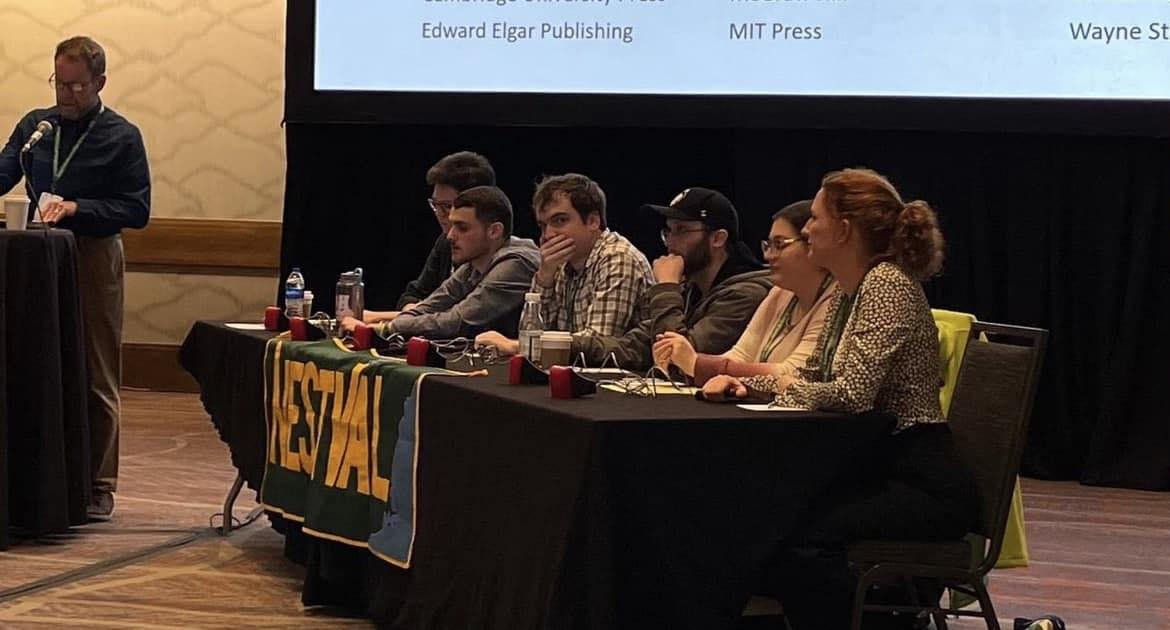
NESTVAL World Geography Bowl team competing at the 2023 AAG annual conference.

== Gameplay ==
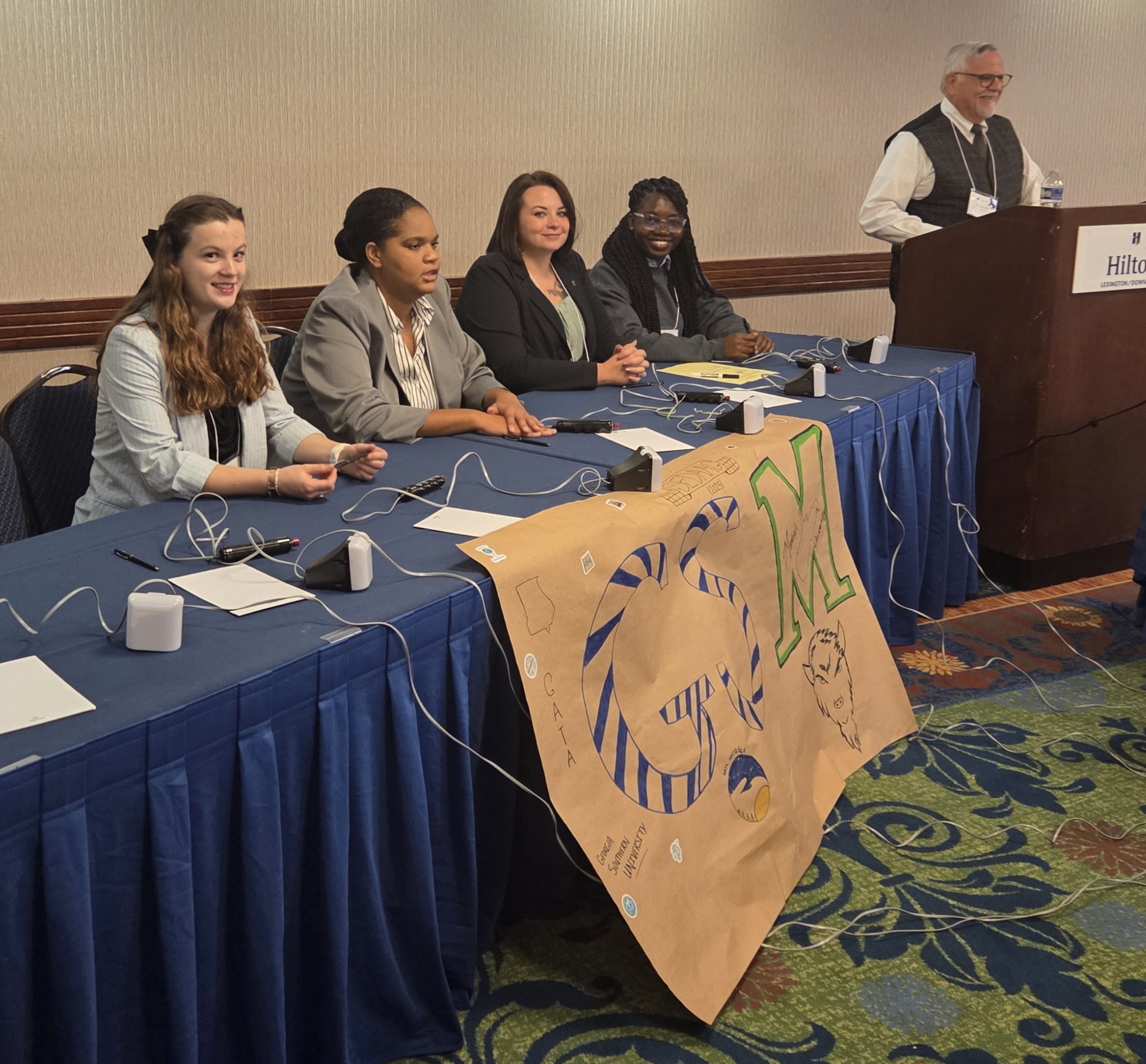
Georgia Southern University and Marshall University students on a combined team at the 2025 SEDAAG World Geography Bowl

Each team participating in a World Geography Bowl can include a maximum of six players, consisting of undergraduate and graduate students. Each team must consist of full-time students, have a "mix of genders", and include at least one undergraduate student. At the regional level, teams are often (but not always) composed of students from the same academic institution or state. At the national level, at least one student on a team must be from a different academic institution than the rest of them. One student can satisfy all of these requirements. Students are not allowed to participate in the WGB for more than four years. One student on the team serves as the captain, with the responsibility of challenging questions answers or calls made by judges if concerns emerge. Each team has a coordinator that serves as a coach and ensures the team conduct is within the guidelines and rules of the WGB. The coordinator is generally a faculty member from one of the participating students institutions.

Teams compete against one other team at a time, and progress through rounds generally competing against each other team present. These rounds are divided into two types of question: Toss-up and team questions. In toss-up questions, an individual team member may buzz in when they think they know an answer without the help of the rest of their team, and are allowed to interrupt the reader. If they get the question right they get a point, and if they get it wrong the reader finishes reading the question and a member of the other team is allowed to buzz in. Each team only gets one chance for one of its members to correctly answer. Team questions allow the team to work together to generate an answer. For each set of questions, one team answers first, and if they have an incomplete answer the other is allowed to complete it for the remaining points. Teams take turns answering first. Questions cover topics such as physical, human, and technical geography, and are primarily written by professors involved with the WGB. Both individual and team scores are tracked, and at regional meetings top scoring individuals are invited to participate at the national competition.

== History ==
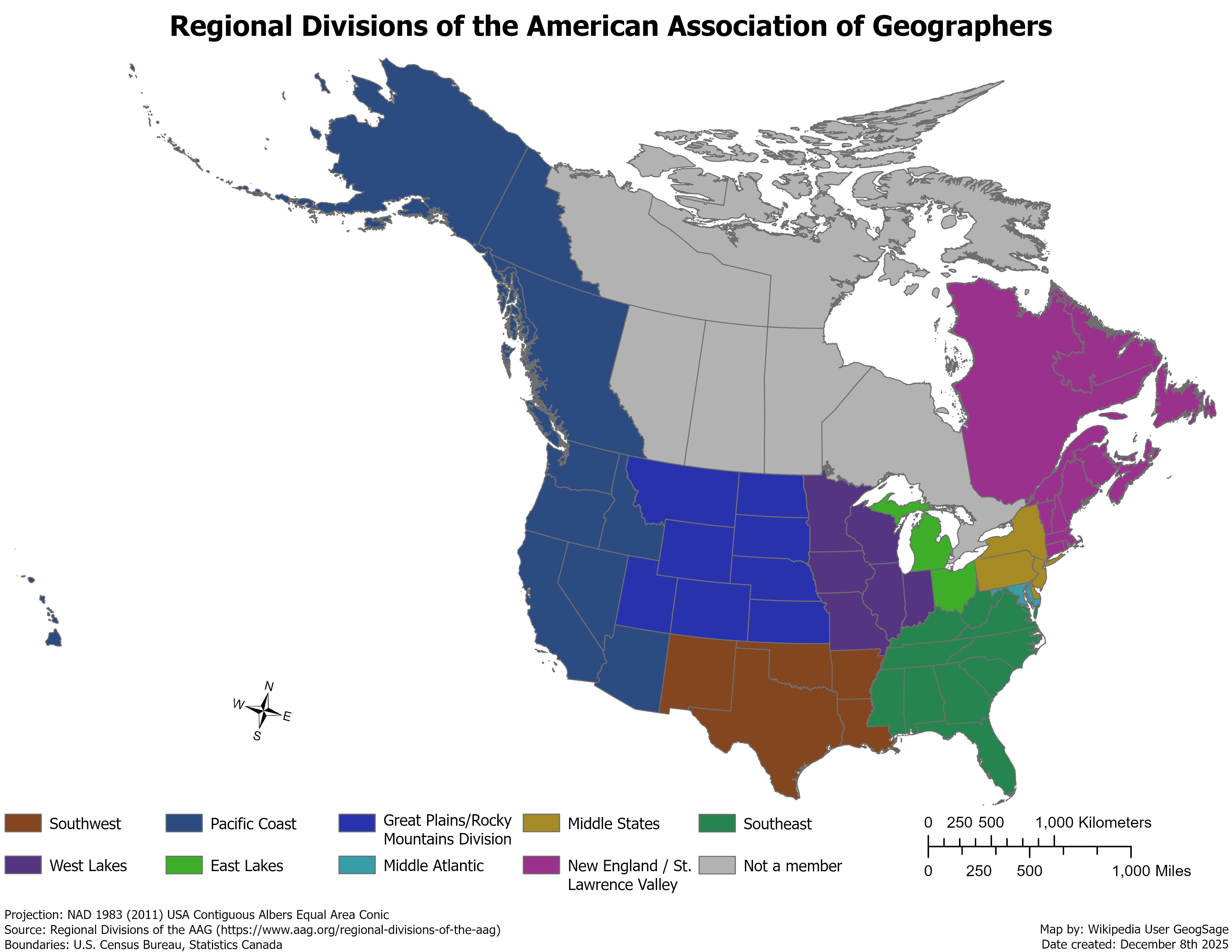
Regional divisions of the American Association of Geographers

The first "Geography Bowl" was at the 1970 South Dakota State Geography Convention and based on the College Bowl show. (Note: It is unclear what impact the South Dakota State Geography Convention Geography Bowl had on the development of the World Geography Bowl.) This bowl consisted of four teams from South Dakota State University and one team from Augustana University, with each team being composed of four students. Subsequent South Dakota State Geography Conventions continued to host some form of a geography bowl. In 1993 and 1994, the Iota Alpha, and Delta Zeta chapters of Gamma Theta Upsilon reported attending the "Geography Bowl" at the South Dakota State Geography Convention in an article published in the Geographical Bulletin.

In 1984, Phyllis Rand published the book Geography Bowl: Quiz Team Book, Mastering Facts Around the World aimed at 6th-grade students, which contained a series of "toss-up" questions and set of rules.

The first "World Geography Bowl" was organized by Bashir Rabat as a Jeopardy!-style tournament, and held in 1987 at North Carolina State University. This first WGB was limited to students from various North Carolina universities, and focused on international affairs. In 1990, the competition was expanded to include other states in the South Eastern Division of the American Association of Geographers (SEDAAG) to participate in a WGB at the regional conference for the first time. In 1991, Bryon Middlekauff from the New England/St. Lawrence Valley Division (NESTVAL) of the AAG attended the SEDAAG WGB, and in 1993 NESTVAL organized a team of students to compete with SEDAAG for the first National WGB at the AAG annual meeting.

In 1992, then president of the AAG Russ Mather suggested in the "Presidents Column" of the AAG Newsletter that the WGB could be expanded to all regional meetings of the AAG, and holding a national championship between regions at the AAG Annual Meeting. In 1993, the SEDAAG WGB Committee was created, consisting of one person from each SEDAAG state. In 1994, the SEDAAG WGB Committee became the WGB sanctioning body for the American Association of Geographers, and adopted a set of rules written by Neal Lineback. To facilitate the game and student participation, the AAG purchased buzzer systems and authorized using AAG funds to support students traveling to participate in the national WGB. In subsequent years, score keeping practices and the formatting of rounds was standardized. In 1994, the AAG purchased electronic buzzer systems to facilitate gameplay which became standard at regional and national events.

By 2000, the East Lakes, Great Plains/Rocky Mountains, New England/St. Lawrence Valley, Middle States, and Southeast Division had annual WGB events at their respective meetings. By 2012, it was estimated that over 12,000 people had participated in WGB events at the national or regional level, including individuals from other countries, with several participants playing for multiple years. In 2014, seven of the nine regions (East Lakes, Great-Plains Rocky Mountains, Middle Atlantic, Middle States, New England-St. Lawrence Valley, Pacific Coast, and Southeast Divisions) had teams participating in the national competition. The Southwest Division began hosting WGB events at their annual meetings in 2016.

The COVID-19 pandemic forced the cancellation of the 2020 WGB, and in 2021 the WGB was held virtually for the first time. In person WGB competition resumed in 2022. In 2021, the AAG requested the World Geography Bowl Executive Committee establish guidelines for the regional competitions. In 2023, the AAG began giving plaques to the winning teams.

== National Competition ==
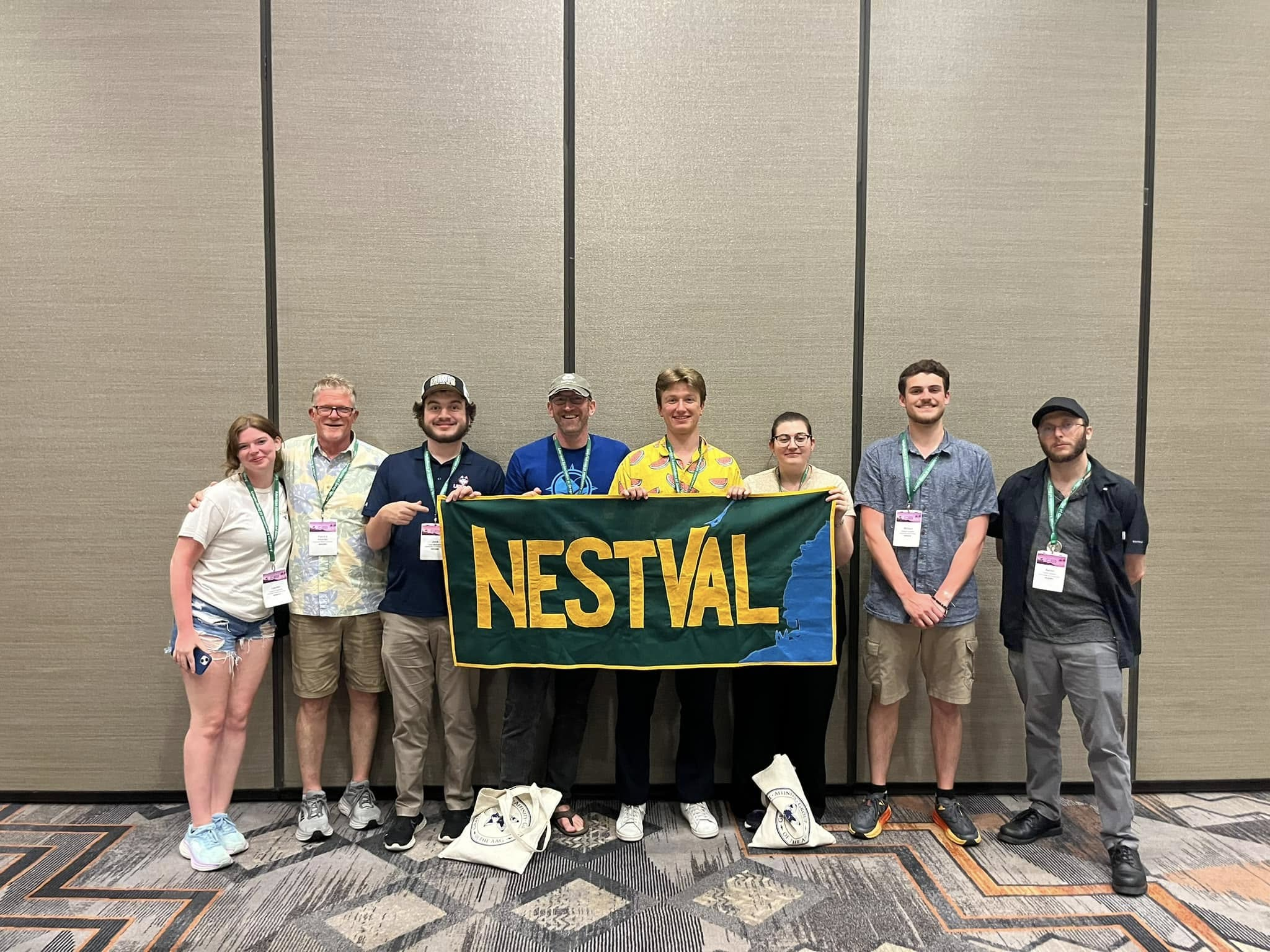
NESTVAL World Geography bowl team at the 2023 AAG annual conference

The WGB national competition has been held at the AAG annual conference since 1993. Teams are composed of students from the nine sub-regions of the AAG, although not every region fields a team every year. Students participating are given travel awards to help cover the cost of attending the conference. According to the SEDAAG World Geography Bowl Committee, "The purpose of the World Geography Bowl is to provide friendly, academic competition among college and university students based on fundamental factual and conceptual geographic knowledge."

National World Geography Bowl winning teams
Year	Winning team	Citation	Note
2026	Middle States Division		
2025	Middle States Division		
2024	Southeast Division		
2023	Great Plains/Rocky Mountain Division		
2022	Southwest Division		(Note: Held virtually due to the COVID-19 pandemic.)
2021	Mid-Atlantic Division		
2020	Canceled		(Note: Canceled due to the COVID-19 pandemic.)
2019	Mid-Atlantic Division		
2018	Mid-Atlantic Division		
2017	Great Plains/Rocky Mountain Division		
2016	Southeast Division		
2015	Association of Pacific Coast Geographers		
2014	East Lakes Division		
2013	Middle States Division		
2012	Great Plains/Rocky Mountain Division		
2011	Great Plains/Rocky Mountain Division		
2010	Southeast Division		
2009	Association of Pacific Coast Geographers		
2008	Middle States Division		
2007	Middle States Division		
2006	Great Plains/Rocky Mountain Division		
2005	Mid-Atlantic Division		
2004	Southeast Division		
2003	Southwest Division		
2002	Middle States Division		
2001	Southeast Division		
2000	Southeast Division		
1999	East Lakes Division		
1998	East Lakes Division		
1997	Middle States Division		
1996	Southeast Division		
1995	Southeast Division		
1994			(Note: Not immediately clear if a World GeoBowl was held at the national AAG conference in 1994.)
1993	Southeast Division		

== Regional competitions ==
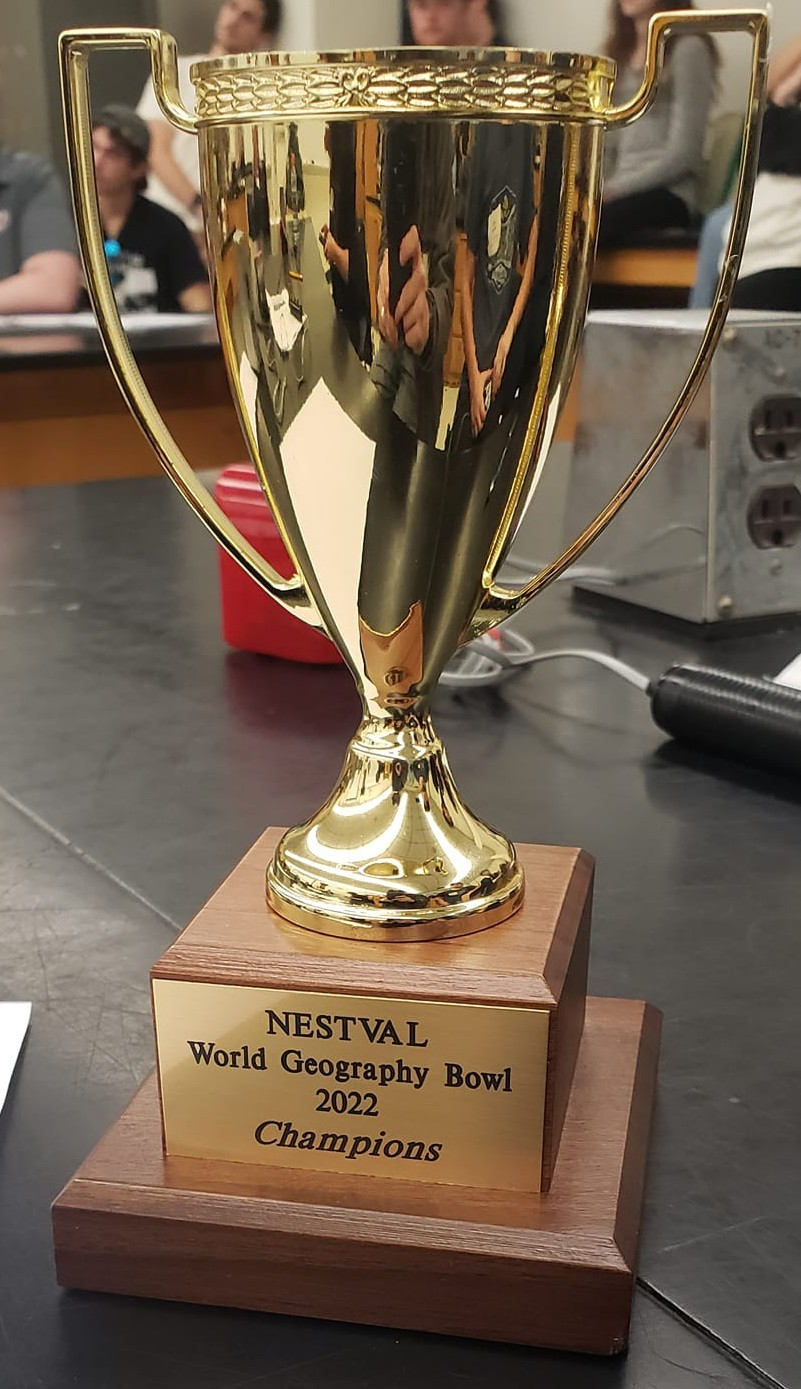
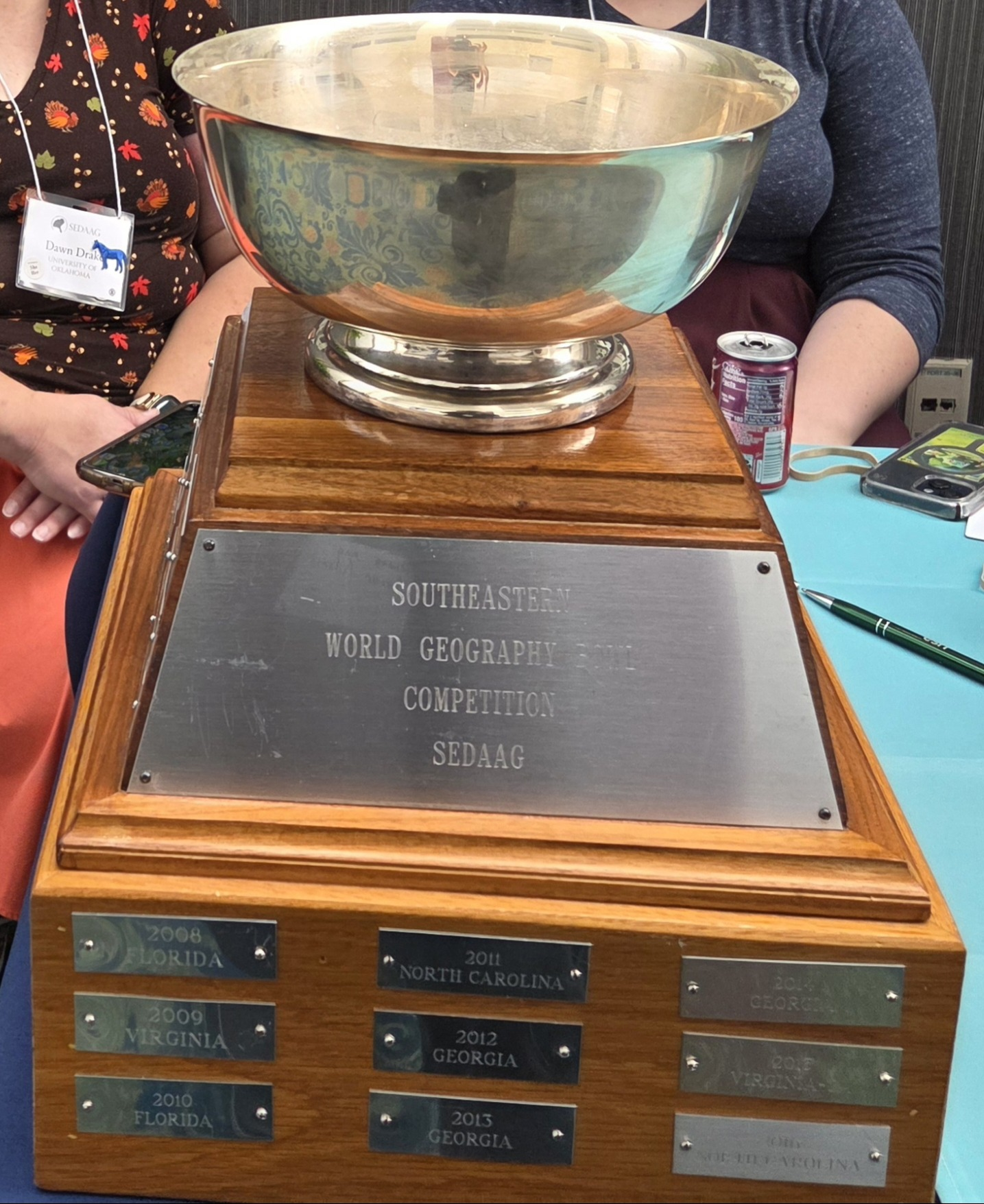
Left: NESTVAL World Geography bowl 2022 regional championship trophy. Right: SEDAAG World Geography bowl 2025 regional championship trophy.

The World Geography Bowl started as a regional event. Every regional division of the AAG hosts a conference, generally in the fall; however, annual meetings for the regions are sometimes combined between regions like the East Lakes and West Lakes divisions. At these meetings, many of the regions host their own WGB. These are formatted the same as the WGB for the national competition, and students with high scores are included in the national team. The way teams are created varies by region and time, with some regions' teams composed only of students from the same school, and others composed of students from the same state. In some cases, states partner to create a single team. The various regions started their local WGB competitions at different times, and not all of them host one regularly. The WGB takes a significant amount of conference time, money, and space to organize; however, in all regions besides West Lakes Division, at least 10% of regional participants stated that the WGB is what they value most about the regional conferences (as compared to journals, meetings, grants & awards, and leadership).

The first WGB was the South Eastern Division in 1990, the East Lakes, Great Plains/Rocky Mountains, New England/St. Lawrence Valley, Middle States, and Southeast Division had annual WGBs by 2000, and the Southwest Division started their tradition in 2015.

Regional World Geography Bowl winning teams
Year	Great Plains/Rocky Mountain Division	Middle Atlantic Division	Middle States Division	New England/St. Lawrence Valley Division	Southeast Division	Southwest Division	Citation	Note
2025			Hofstra University	University of Massachusetts Amherst				
2024	Brigham Young University	Salisbury University	Binghamton University	University of Connecticut				
2023	Brigham Young University			University of Massachusetts Amherst				
2022	South Dakota State University			University of Connecticut				
2021				University of New Hampshire		University of North Texas		
2020				University of Massachusetts Amherst				
2019						Texas State University		
2018						Texas State University		
2017				University of New Hampshire	University of North Carolina Greensboro	Texas State University		
2016					University of North Carolina Greensboro	Texas A&M University		
2015					Virginia			
2014			Montclair State University		Georgia			
2013				Bridgewater State University	Georgia			
2012				Clark University	Georgia			
2011				Concordia University	North Carolina			
2010				University of Connecticut	Florida			
2009				Plymouth State University	Virginia			

== Other Geography bowls ==
Kennesaw State University has hosted WGB events for high school students starting in 2000. Jacksonville, Illinois holds an annual "Geography bowl" for elementary school students, hosted by the Jacksonville High School Geography Club. In the Jacksonville geography bowl, students compete with other elementary schools virtually from their home school. Several chapters from Gamma Theta Upsilon host their own WGB on their campus.

== Criticism and controversy ==
In 2024 an article titled Bowling for Better: Reforming World Geography Bowl to Create a More Inclusive Geography was published in The Professional Geographer and levied several criticisms at the World Geography Bowl, with the authors of the paper relying on their personal experience participating in a World Geography Bowl. The criticisms included "Assumptions About Community Formation", the "Style and Types of Questions", the focus on individual performance, and the way money is distributed to participants. To address these criticisms, the paper suggested alternative activities such as "Geography Karaoke", or a geography "Shark Tank". To improve the questions, the authors suggest expanding the pool of question writers, which currently mostly consist of geography professors, by crowdsourcing. To improve diversity, they suggested using random distribution of players created by drawing numbers instead of the current policy mandating a mix of genders, graduate and undergraduate students, and mix of schools. To address the way funds are distributed, the paper suggests funding the entire winning team at a regional WGB, rather than the individual highest scorers across all teams in the regional WGB. They also suggested holding the WGB using video conference software, so participants do not need to travel to the national annual meeting.

In response, an article titled Commentary on Craig et al.'s "Bowling for Better: Reforming World Geography Bowl" was published in The Professional Geographer in 2025. The commentary synthesized "the perspectives of more than a dozen individuals who have participated in the WGB as competitors, both undergraduate and graduate, volunteers, and directors, from its inception until today to counter the image given by the authors." The commentary addressed factual errors that misrepresented the WGB, criticised the original paper's methodology, and responded to the suggestions. On the distribution of funds, the paper stated the proposed method would result in an insufficient amount of money for anyone to attend. In response to the proposal for alternative formats, the authors of the commentary encouraged the creation of other events in addition to the WGB if money, volunteers, and space could be found to facilitate them.

== See also ==
- Geography Cup – 2006 online geography competition
- GIS Day – Annual geographic information systems public outreach day
- National Geographic Bee – Geography competition held in American schools
- National Geographic World Championship – Biennial, two-day-long international geography competition
