= WGP =

WGP may refer to:

== Arts and entertainment ==
- West German Pottery, an art period; 1941–1990
- WGP Kickboxing, a Brazilian promotion

== Materials ==
- Weapons-grade plutonium
- White gold plating:
  - White gold (plated onto another metal)
  - Colloquially, rhodium plating of gold

== Other uses ==
- Wales Green Party, a UK political party (formed 1990)
- Umbu Mehang Kunda Airport, Indonesia (IATA:WGP)

== See also ==
- WGPS (disambiguation)
- WGB (disambiguation)
- World Justice Project, a non-profit
