= Rebecca Lave =

American critical physical geographer

- Citizenship: United States of America
- Education: University of California, Berkeley, Massachusetts Institute of Technology, Reed College,
- Occupation: Geographer

Rebecca Lave is a geographer, professor of geography at Indiana University Bloomington (IU), and former president of the American Association of Geographers (AAG). Her research focuses on critical geography, as it applies to physical geography, as part of the emerging field of critical physical geography. She has focused on bridging the gap between physical and human geography in her research, as a department chair at IU, and as the president of the AAG.

== Education and field ==
Lave earned their B.A. in Art history and Political science from Reed College in 1993. She earned both her Master of City Planning and Certificate in Urban Design from Massachusetts Institute of Technology in 1997. In 2008, Lave earned her Ph.D. in geography from the University of California, Berkeley. When doing her Ph.D., Lave focused on the interface between human and physical geography, to the chagrin of their advisors. This experience shaped Lave's career as a researcher and in her service at IU and the AAG.

== Career ==
=== Industry ===
Lave's career began with their work as an Urban Planner at Goody, Clancy & Associates in Boston, MA, from 1996 to 1998. Following this, they transitioned into a non-academic role as a Senior Associate in Design, Community & Environment in Berkeley, CA, a position they held from 1999 to 2005.

=== Academic ===
After earning their Ph.D., Lave joined Indiana University's Geography Department as an assistant professor from 2008 to 2014. This marked a significant shift towards academia. Subsequently, they advanced to associate professor in the same department, a position they held from 2014 to 2020. In 2020, they achieved the highest academic rank of Full Professor in the Geography Department at Indiana University. At IU, Lave has served as department chair from 2019 to 2022. They have served on numerous graduate student committees and University positions.

Lave is very involved in professional organizations, especially the American Association of Geographers. From 2022 to 2023, she served as the AAG vice president. In 2023, Lave became the AAG president. Lave has focused on expanding the interdisciplinary nature of geography, and emphasized links between physical and human geography.

== Research and publications ==
Lave's research has focused on environmental restoration, watershed management, agriculture, the Anthropocene, and bridging the gap between human and physical geography. They are instrumental in establishing the discipline of critical physical geography. In 2017, they advocated for the preservation and archiving of government data to prevent it from being lost or deleted.

Title	Author(s) or volume editor(s)	Year first published	ISBN	Refs
Streams of Revenue: The Restoration Economy and the Ecosystems It Creates	Rebecca Lave; Martin Doyle	2021	ISBN 978-0262539197	
The Palgrave Handbook of Critical Physical Geography	Rebecca Lave; Christine Biermann; Stuart N. Lane	2018	ISBN 978-3-319-71460-8	
Doreen Massey: Critical Dialogues	Marion Werner; Jamie Peck; Rebecca Lave; Brett Christophers	2018	ISBN 978-1911116868	
The Routledge Handbook of the Political Economy of Science	David Tyfield; Rebecca Lave; Samuel Randalls; Charles Thorpe	2017	ISBN 9781315685397	
Fields and Streams: Stream Restoration, Neoliberalism, and the Future of Environmental Science (Geographies of Justice and Social Transformation Ser.)	Rebecca Lave	2012	ISBN 978-0820343921	

== Awards, recognition, and professional honors ==
Lave has received many awards and recognitions throughout her professional career, both for her research and teaching. Notable among these awards is the G.K. Gilbert Award from the American Association of Geographers Geomorphology Specialty Group in 2018 for the paper "The morphology of streams restored for market and nonmarket purposes: Insights from a mixed natural-social science approach". (Note: Award shared with coauthors on paper "The morphology of streams restored for market and nonmarket purposes: Insights from a mixed natural-social science approach")

== See also ==
- Gamma Theta Upsilon – International geography honor society
- Marilyn Raphael – Trinidadian climatologist
- Mei-Po Kwan – Geographer
- Mona Domosh – American geographer and academic
- Waldo Tobler – American geographer
- Yi-Fu Tuan – Chinese-American geographer (1930–2022)
