= West German Art Pottery =

20th century pottery style

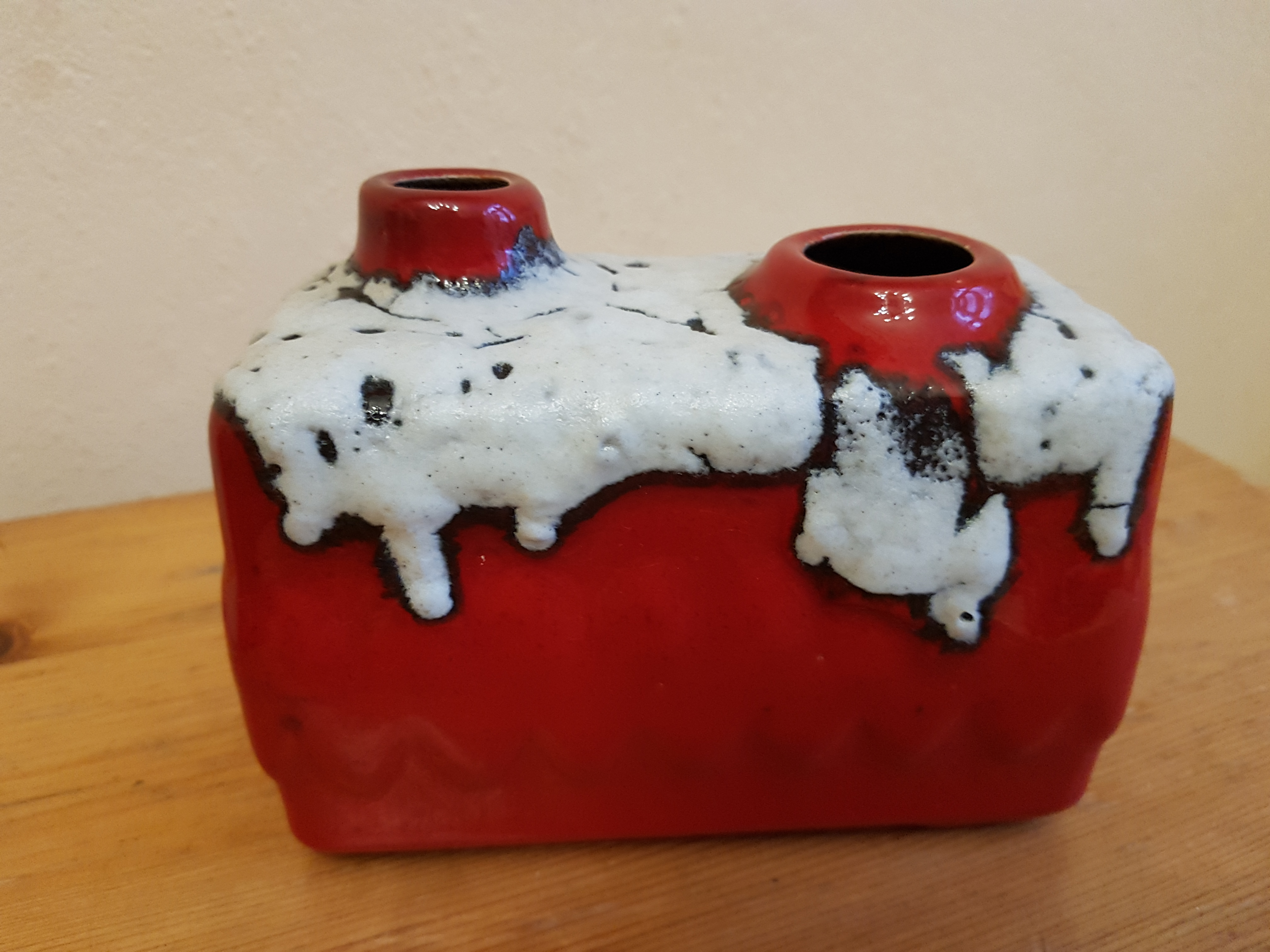
Bay Keramik model 316:10, with classic "Fat Lava" glaze

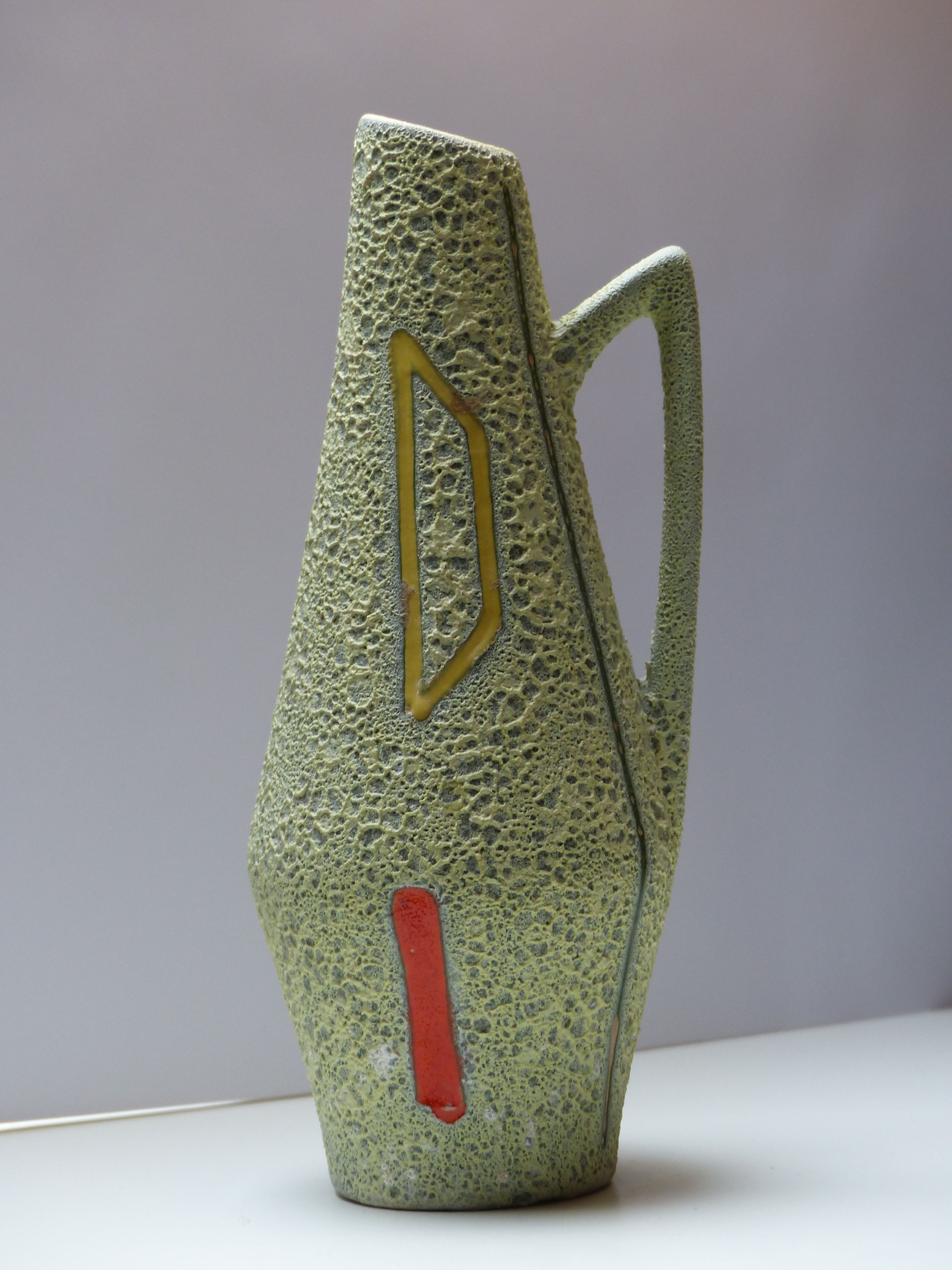
Scheurich vase, model 271, 22 cm tall

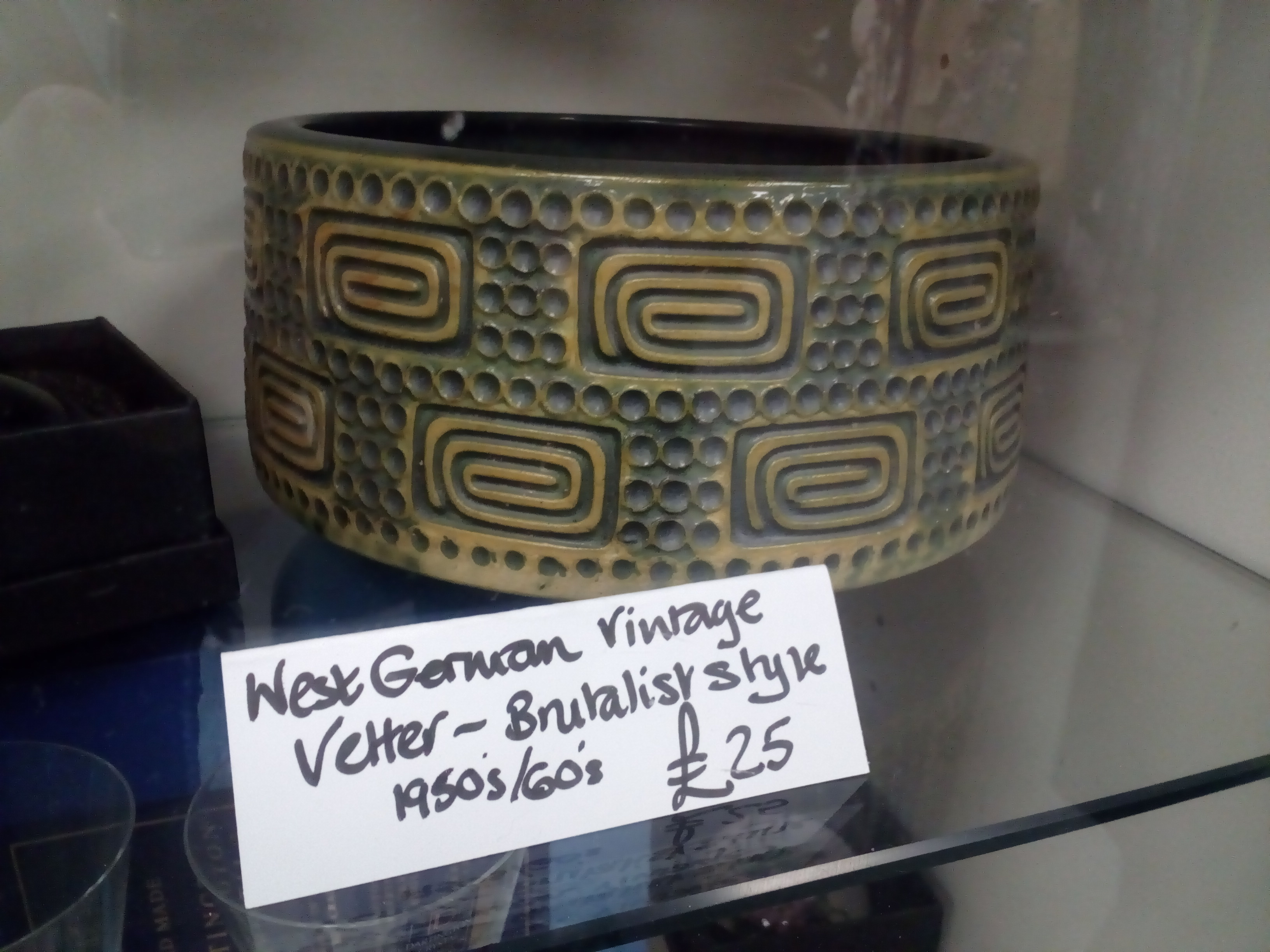
Brutalist style 'Vetter' bowl, for sale at a charity (thrift) shop in Birmingham, England.

West German Art Pottery is essentially a term describing the time period of 1949–1990 and became the early way to describe the pottery because the country of origin, with numbers denoting the shape and size, was often the only "mark" on the base. Even though company names are now better known, and many items are attributed to specific makers, the more generic term "West German pottery" remains in common use. "Fat Lava" is a popular term that strictly refers to a fairly small subcategory of glazes but is all too often improperly used as a synonym for West German pottery. West Germany began in 1949: World War II ended in 1945, the next 4 years were the "zone" era with the country into the "US Zone", "Russian/Soviet Zone", "British Zone", and "French Zone", and it was 1949 when the East/West division replaced the zones.

The work of the main producers in the style concentrated on single decorative items such as vases, jugs and bowls, rather than sets of tableware. There were a relatively large numbers of basic shapes in the plain clay body, and these were heavily decorated, typically with a great variety of glaze effects in more than one colour, many using thick contoured glazes. The bodies sometimes carried moulded patterning or incised decoration (as in the 'Vetter' bowl) but glaze colours usually had the impression of being placed by flowing or brushing, rather than more precise painting. Figurative decoration is not very common, and typically plant-based when it occurs.

A common style of base mark was "W. Germany", xxx shape number / or - xx height in cm. The name of the manufacturer was often carried on an adhesive sticker prominently attached to the body of the piece, which is now usually lost.

== History ==
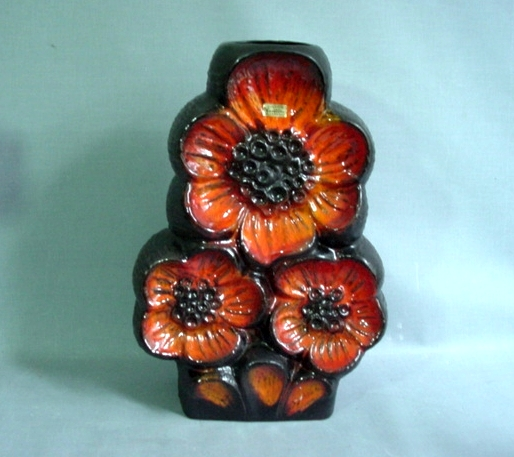
Vase by Carstens, not "fat lava".

After the defeat of Nazi Germany, it took a few years to rebuild the German pottery industry. During its heyday from the 1950s until the 1970s, over 100 pottery and porcelain companies and studio potters were actively producing art pottery in West Germany. Scheurich, Carstens, Bay, ES, and Dümler & Breiden were the most prolific producers, and while production began slowing in the early 1970s, a wide variety of art pottery was produced well in the 1980s.

West German Art Pottery is well known for its great variety of forms and expressive colors. The pottery began getting attention in the mid 1990s, and interest has been growing ever since. Horst Makus published several books in the late 90s and after, but those are in German and limited to the period up to about 1962.

In 2006 Graham Cooley organised the exhibition "Fat Lava: West German Ceramics of the 60s & 70s" at the King’s Lynn Arts Centre from his vast collection. This exhibition popularized the phrase "fat lava" but was not the origin as some believe. The term was in use by eBay sellers years before and may have originated as a mistranslation by computer programs. Mark Hill published "Fat Lava", which is an expanded catalog for Graham Cooley's exhibition and collection. The book has since been revised multiple times. In 2021, a Japanese edition of Fat Lava was also published, further expanding the reach and appreciation of West German art pottery.

Kevin Graham has produced a variety of cds, and Graham and Henrik Aaroe co-produced "German Ceramic 1960–1990" in 2016. However, published work remains scarce and limited in scope. There are also a variety of essays and videos on the Gin-For's Odditiques site. However, a great deal remains undocumented, and some of the early research had significant errors. Attributions continue to be corrected, so information should be checked to make sure it is up to date.

=== Fat Lava ===
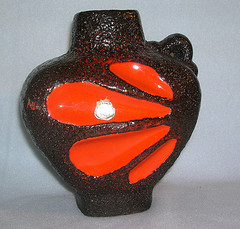
Vase by Es-Keramik with volcanic glaze, but not "fat lava".

The terms Fat Lava and West German Art Pottery are often used interchangeably, but technically have a different meaning. Fat Lava refers specifically to a type of thick glazes that gives the object a thick lava-like look. This type of glaze was commonly used in this period by German pottery manufacturers. The term Fat Lava itself though is of a much more recent date. It has been suggested that the term Fat Lava first emerged with an exhibition curated by Graham Cooley during the King's Lynn Arts Festival in 2006, but the term was actually being used by sellers in Germany at least a decade earlier and may actually be due to a slightly faulty computer translation that came up with "fat" when the more accurate term would be "thick". The precise origin is likely to remain uncertain, but it definitely predates the Fat Lava exhibition and related catalog.

== Well-known producers ==
- Bay Keramik
- Carstens Tönnieshof
- Ceramano
- Dümler & Breiden
- ES Keramik Emons & Söhne
- Fohr Keramik
- Gräflich Ortenburg
- VEB Haldensleben (GDR)
- Hutschenreuther
- Jlkra or Ilkra Edel Keramik
- Jasba
- Jopeko
- Karlsruhe Majolika
- Marei
- Marzi & Remy
- Otto Keramik
- P Keramik
- Roth Keramik
- Ruscha
- Scheurich
- Steuler
- VEB Strehla Keramik (GDR)
- Vetter
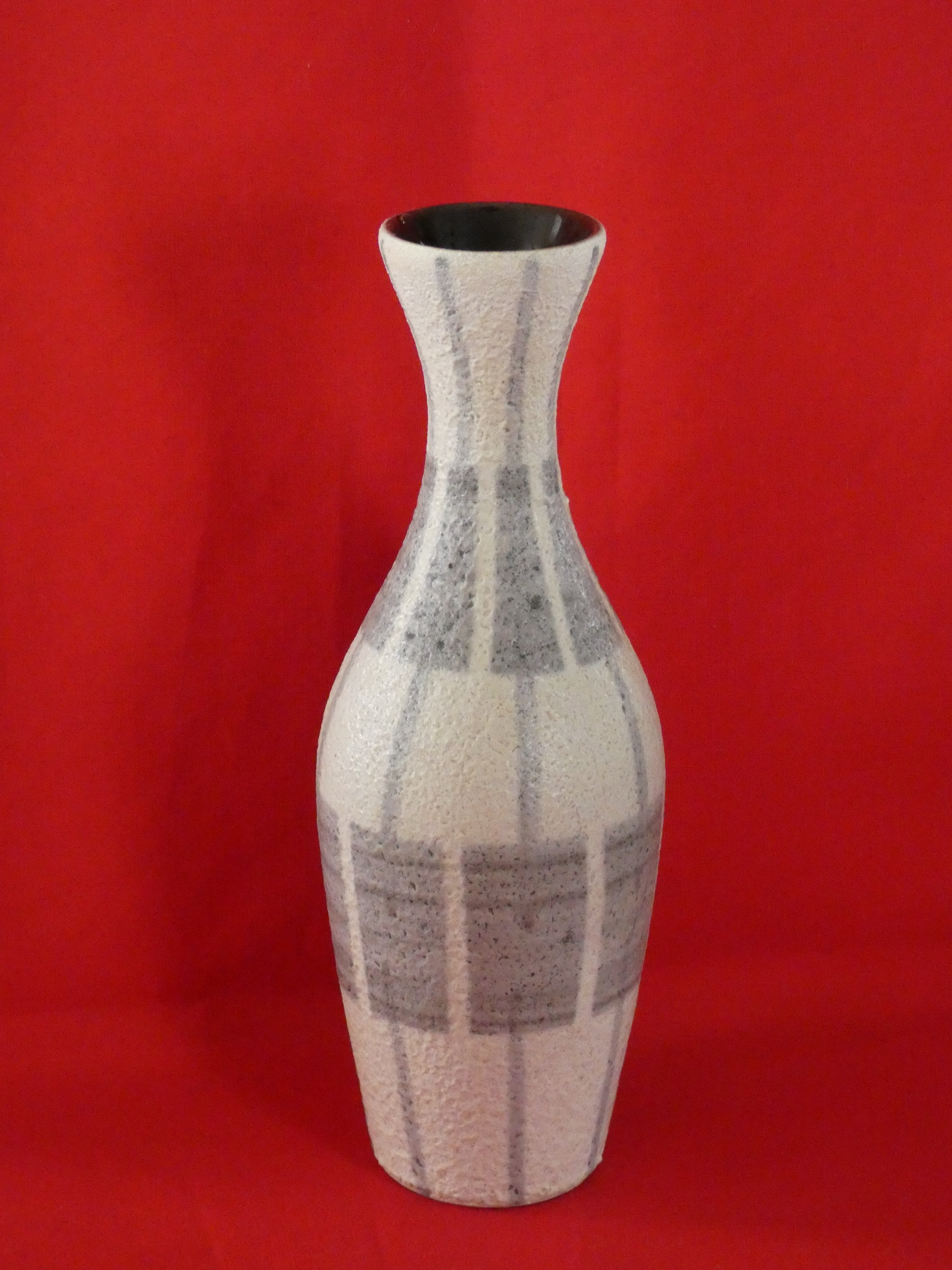
Jlkra or Ilkra Edel Keramik 237-20

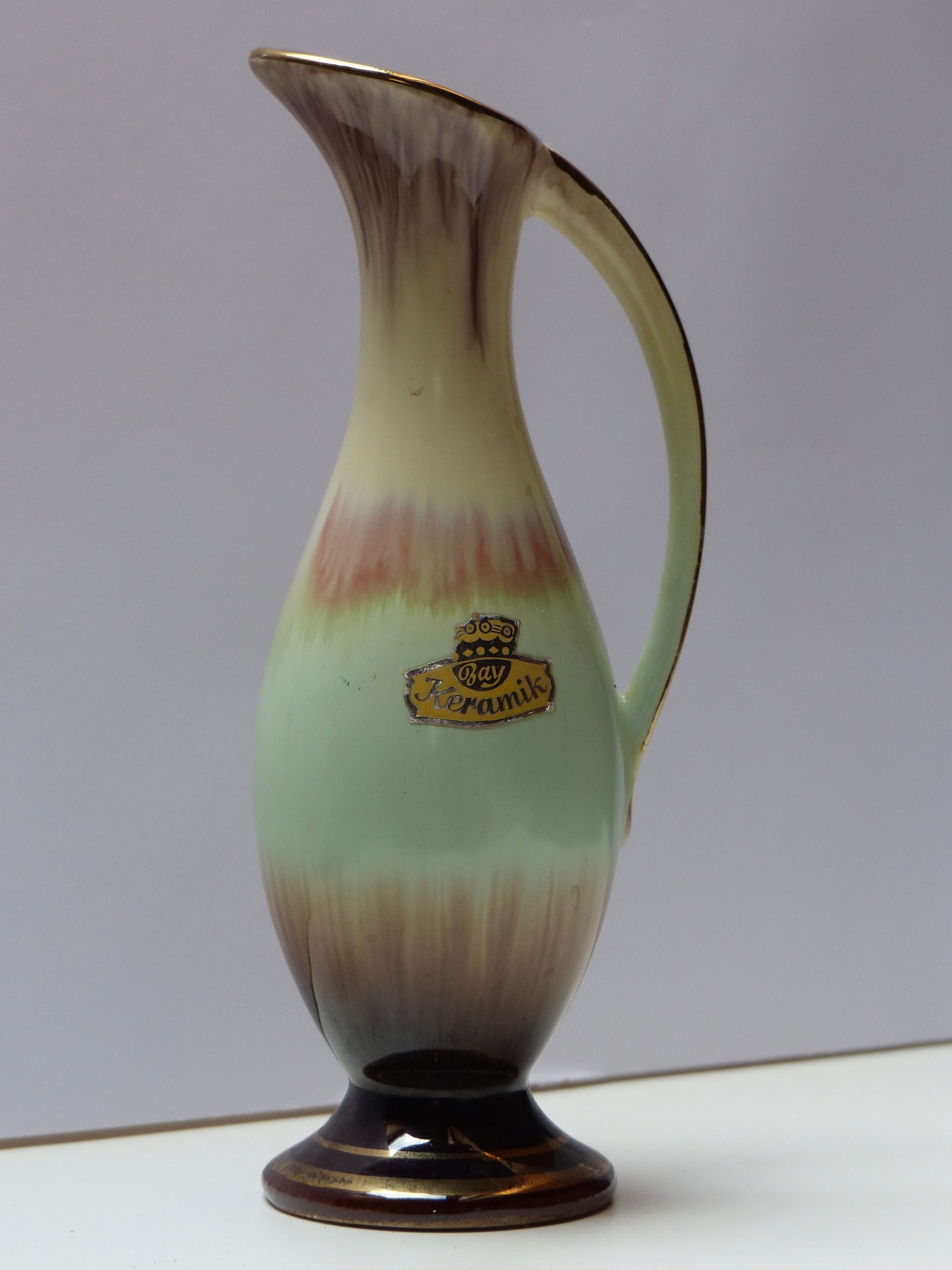
Bay, 1950s, model 523, 20 cm

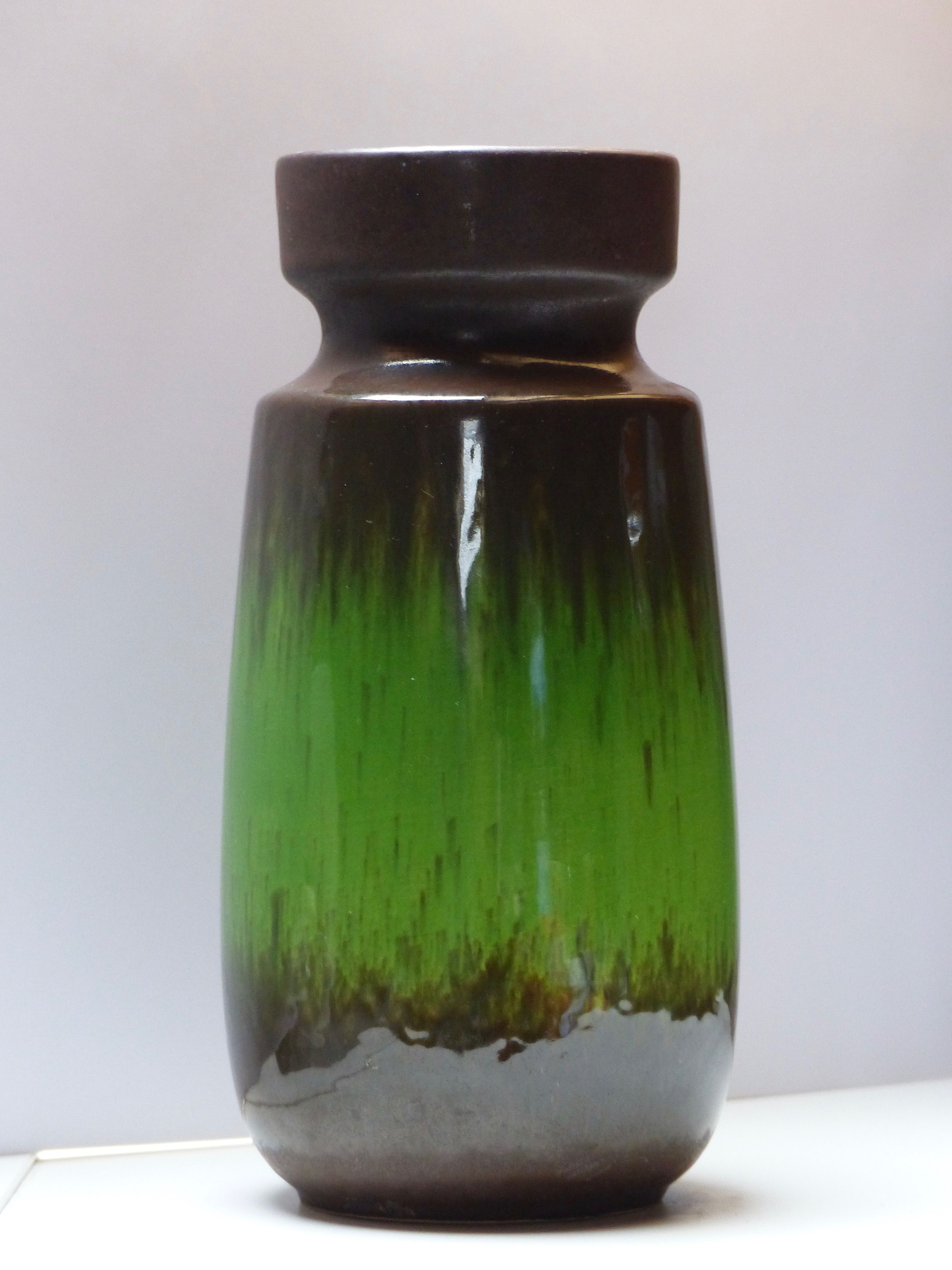
Scheurich, model 242, 22 cm tall

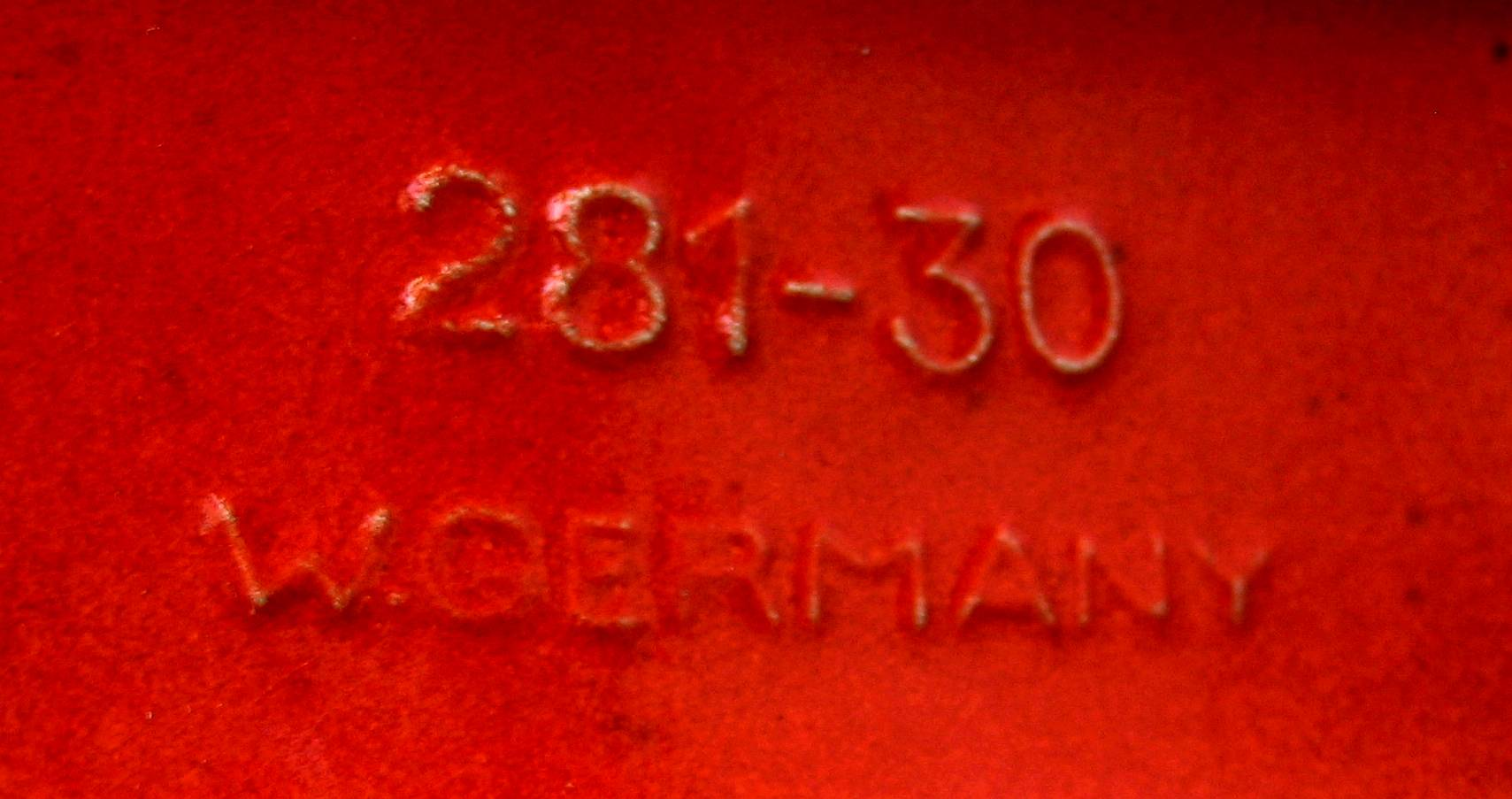
Common Scheurich Base with shape number, size reference, and country

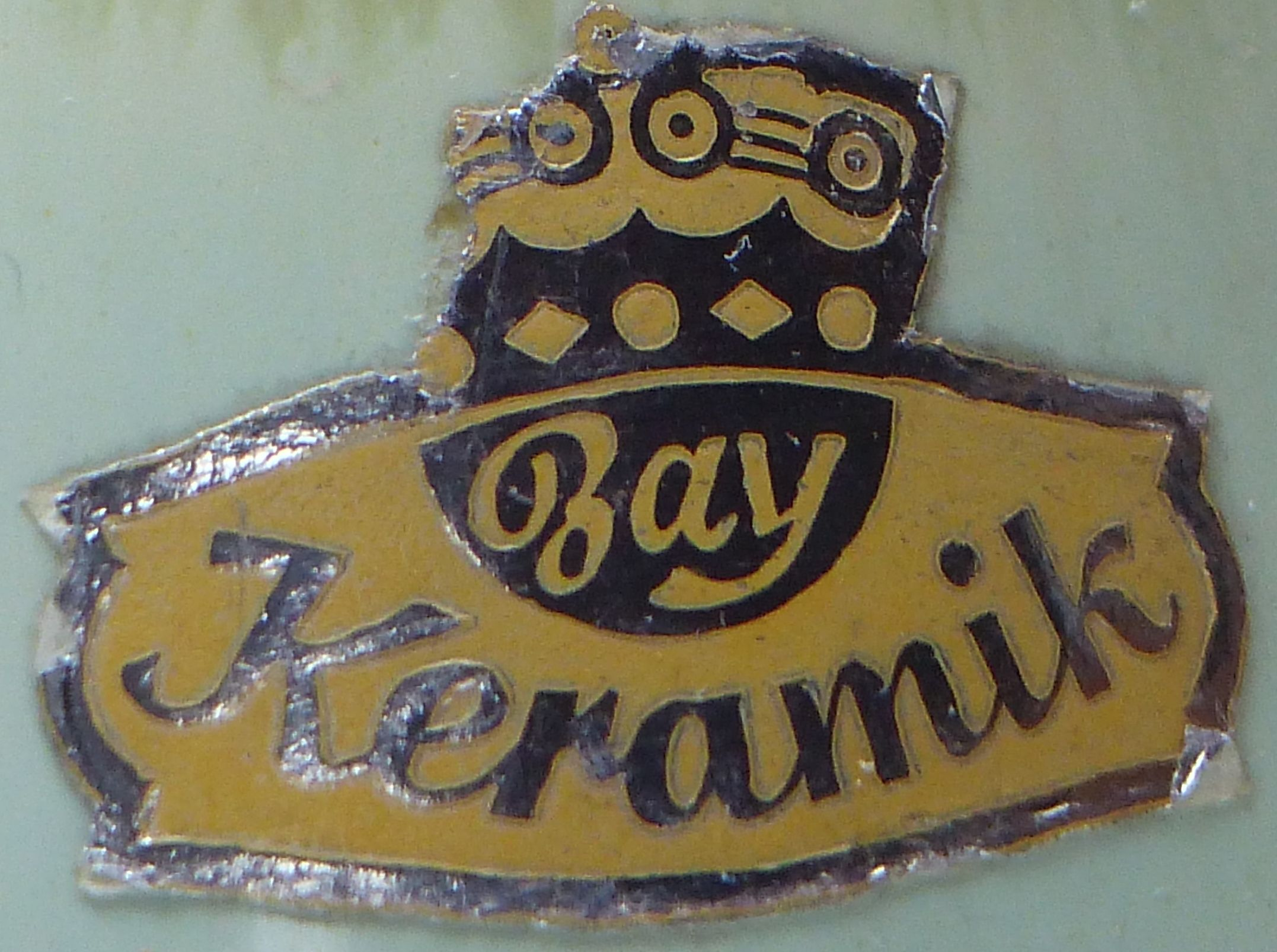
Bay Keramik label, 1950s; typically such sticky labels, now mostly lost, were the only indication of the maker.

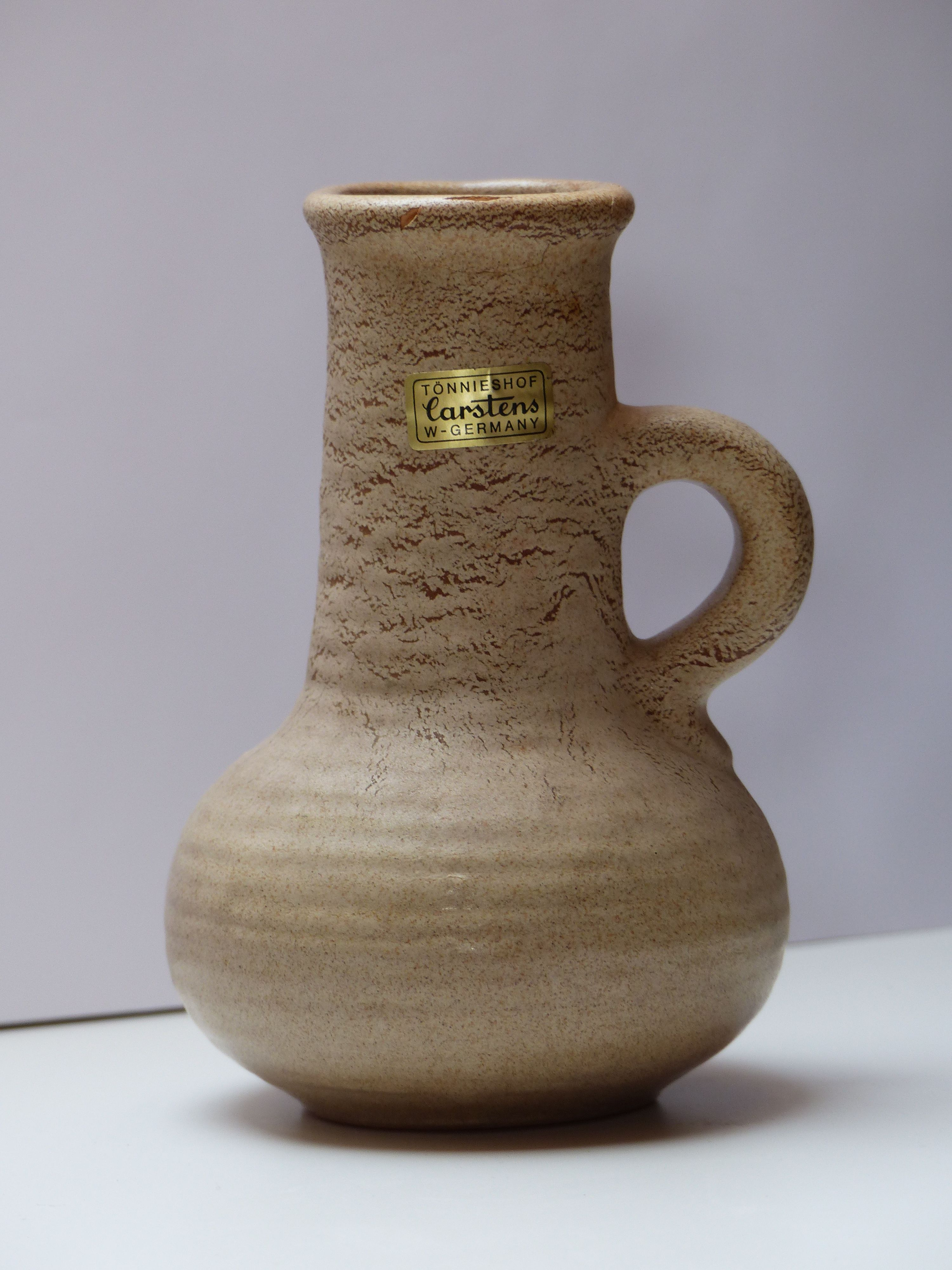
Carstens jug

== Bibliography ==
- Hill, Mark. Fat Lava, West German Ceramics of the 1960s & 70s. ISBN 0-9552-8654-9.
- Thomas, Michael P. (2006). Deutsche Keramik und Porzellane der 60er & 70er Jahre (in German). ISBN 3-00-017329-3.
- Trembley, Nicolas (2011). Sgrafo vs Fat Lava. ISBN 978-3-03764-163-7.
