= WGBS =

WGBS may refer to:

- WGBS-LD, a low-power television station (channel 11) licensed to serve Hampton, Virginia, United States
- WAQI, a radio station (710 AM) licensed to serve Miami, Florida, United States, which used the call sign WGBS until October 1985
- WINS (AM), a radio station (1010 AM) licensed to serve New York, New York, United States, which formerly used the call sign WGBS
- WGBS-TV, a television station (channel 23) licensed to serve Miami, Florida, which operated under this call sign from 1954 to 1957
  - WLTV-DT, a television station (channel 23) licensed to serve Miami, Florida, which operates under the former WGBS-TV license
- WPSG, a television station (channel 57/digital 33) licensed to serve Philadelphia, Pennsylvania, United States, which used the call sign WGBS-TV from October 1985 to December 1995
- WGBS, a fictional television station depicted in DC Comics publications
- Watford Grammar School for Boys, in Watford, Hertfordshire, United Kingdom
- Whole genome bisulfite sequencing, a NGS technology to determine DNA methylation
