= Geographical Bulletin =

American academic journal

- Discipline: Geography
- Language: English
- Edited by: Nancy Hoalst Pullen, Mark Patterson

Publication details
- History: 1970-present
- Publisher: Gamma Theta Upsilon (United States)
- Frequency: Biannually
- Open access: Yes

Standard abbreviations
- ISO 4: Geogr. Bull.

Indexing
- ISSN: 2163-5900

Links
- Journal homepage

Geographical Bulletin is a biannual open-access peer-reviewed academic journal published by the international geographic honor society Gamma Theta Upsilon. It covers all aspects of geography and focuses on student-written and student-led research. The journal was founded in 1970 and migrated to a digital commons platform in 2023.

== History ==
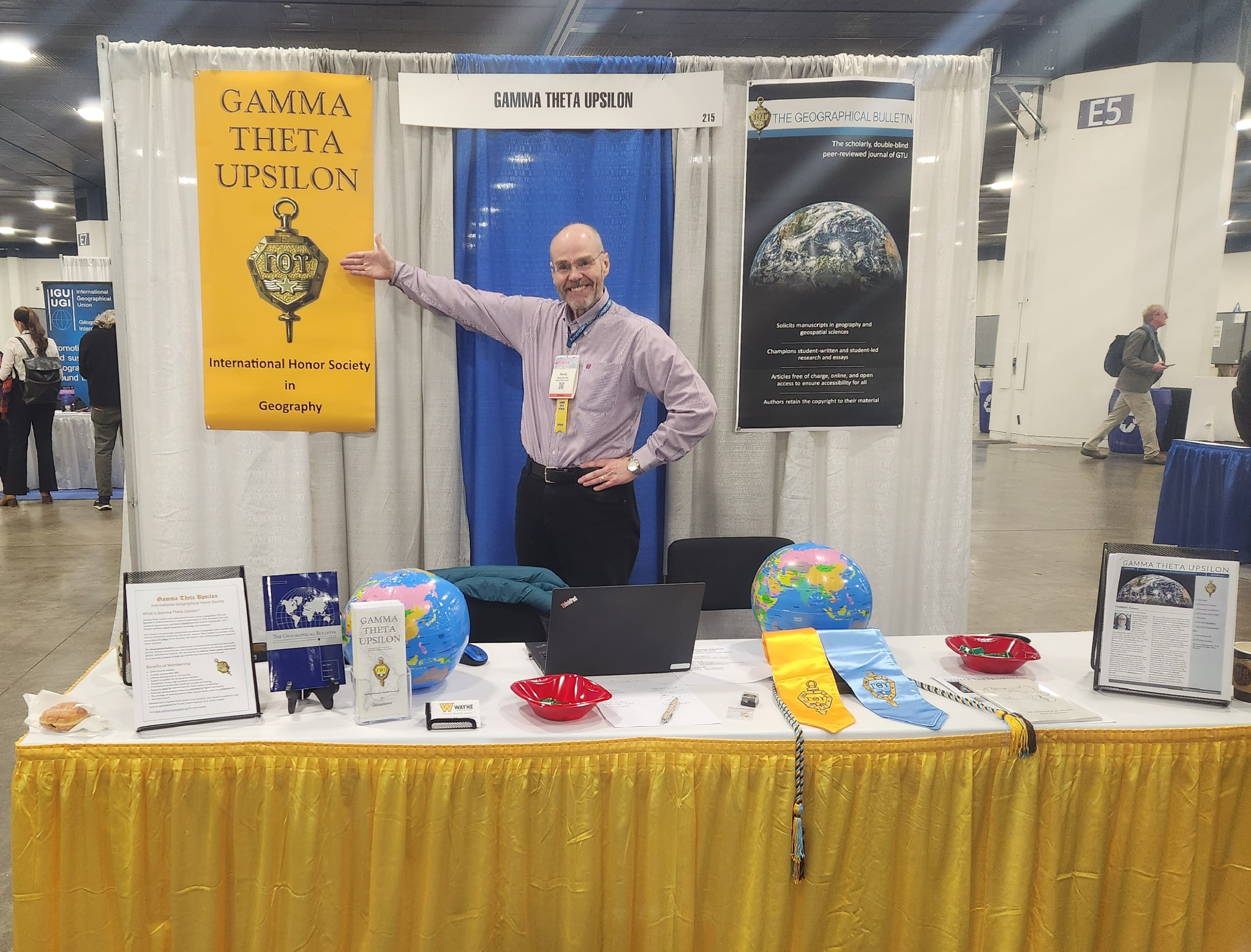
GTU outreach coordinator Dr. Randy Bertolas at the Gamma Theta Upsilon booth, 2025 American Association of Geographers annual conference in Detroit, Michigan

Geographical Bulletin is a biannual open-access peer-reviewed academic journal published by the international geographic honor society Gamma Theta Upsilon (ΓΘΥ or GTU). Gamma Theta Upsilon established the journal in 1970 to provide an outlet for geography-focused student research. The journal covers all aspects of geography and focuses on student-written and student-led research. While the journal focuses on student research, being a student is not a requirement for consideration.

In May 2018, the journal began publishing online-only open access and made the entire archive available for free. In May 2023, the journal migrated to a digital commons platform. Since 2023, the editors-in-chief are Nancy Hoalst Pullen and Mark Patterson of Kennesaw State University.

== See also ==
- American Association of Geographers
- Geographic Information Systems
- National Council for Geographic Education
