= Gamma Theta Upsilon =

International geography honor society

- ΓΘΥ
- Founded: May 15, 1928; 98 years ago Illinois State University
- Type: Honor
- Affiliation: ACHS
- Status: Active
- Emphasis: Geography
- Scope: International
- Colors: Brown, Light blue, and Gold
- Publication: Geographical Bulletin
- Chapters: 312
- Members: 62,000+ lifetime
- Headquarters: c/o Dr. Burrell Montz, Geography, Planning, and Environment, Brewster A-238; East Carolina University; Greenville, North Carolina 27858-4353; United States
- Website: gammathetaupsilon.org

Gamma Theta Upsilon (ΓΘΥ or GTU) is an international honor society in geography. It was established in 1928 as a professional fraternity at Illinois State University and became international in 1969. Gamma Theta Upsilon is a member of Association of College Honor Societies.

== History ==
On May 15, 1928, a local professional fraternity by the name of Gamma Theta Upsilon was formed at Illinois State University under the guidance of Dr. R. G. Buzzard. Before that, it was the Geography Club at Illinois State Normal University. After three years, letters were sent out to other geography clubs suggesting the formation of a national fraternity.

On May 15, 1931, the organization, consisting of four chapters, was announced. On March 5, 1936, Gamma Theta Upsilon was incorporated, then with ten chapters, as a professional fraternity in geography under the laws of Illinois.

The purpose of Gamma Theta Upsilon is:

- To further professional interest in geography by affording a common organization for those interested in this field.
- To strengthen student and professional training through academic experiences other than those of the classroom and laboratory.
- To advance the status of geography as a cultural and practical discipline for study and investigation.
- To encourage student research of high quality and to promote an outlet for publication. To create and administer funds for furthering graduate study and/or research in the field of geography.

Gamma Theta Upsilon became an International Honorary Geographical Society in January 1969. The organization is a college honor society became a member of the Association of College Honor Societies in 1976. As of 2012, it had initiated 62,000 members.

Gamma Theta Upsilon holds an annual business meeting in conjunction with the Association of American Geographers conference or the National Council for Geographic Education conference. Its headquarters is at East Carolina University in Greenville, North Carolina.

== Symbols ==
The initials of Gamma Theta Upsilon, ΓΘΥ, represent three Greek words—Ge, Thalatta, and Hypaithrios— meaning earth, sea, and atmosphere respectively.

The Gamma Theta Upsilon badge is key in the form of a seven-sided shield, the bevel of which carries on each side the initial of one of the continents of the earth. Beginning with Europe at the top, left and going counterclockwise are the symbols for North America, South America, Antarctica, the Old or Eastern World, Australia, Africa, and Asia. Across the base of the key are five wavy blue lines, symbolizing the five oceans— the Atlantic, the Indian, the Pacific, the Arctic, and the Antarctic or Great Southern Ocean. On top of the waves is a white star, symbolic of Polaris which is used for navigation. In the center of the key are the Greek letters ΓΘΥ.

The society's colors are brown for the earth, blue for the oceans, and gold for sunlight.

== Chapters ==
As of December 2012, Gamma Theta Upsilon has chartered 312 chapters and has 163 active chapters.

== Activities ==
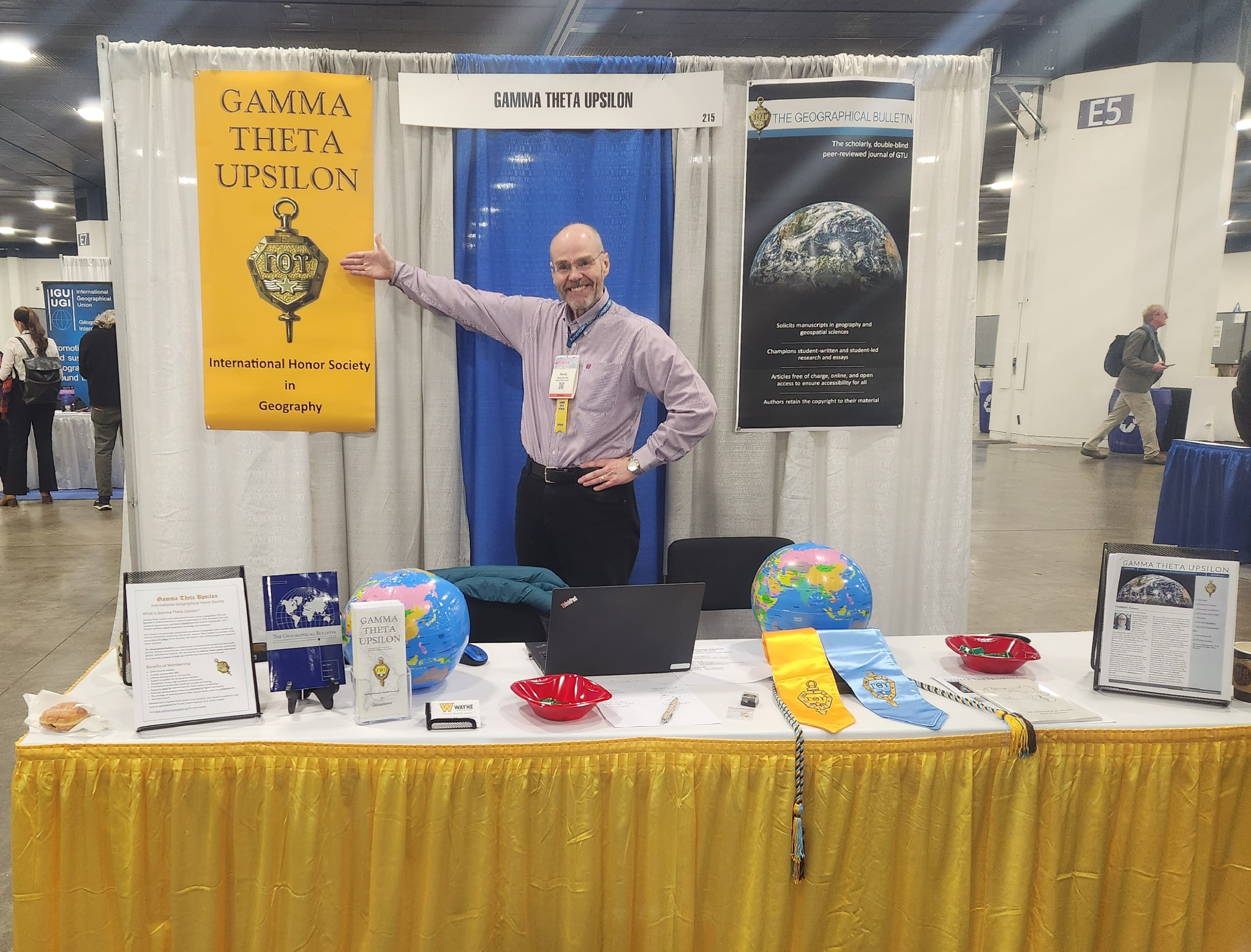
GTU outreach coordinator Dr. Randy Bertolas at the Gamma Theta Upsilon Booth at the 2025 AAG annual conference in Detroit Michigan.

Gamma Theta Upsilon publishes the Geographical Bulletin, a peer-reviewed scholarly journal twice a year. It annually awards four undergraduate scholarships and one graduate scholarship to geography students. The society also funds the Visiting Geographical Scientist Program, which is administered by the Association of American Geographers. The program allows chapters to host a distinguished geographer who presents a lecture on a topic in geography and meets with faculty, students, and administrators.

== Membership ==
Once a chapter has been established, students can be initiated into the society. Initiates must have completed a minimum of three geography courses, must have a GPA of at least 3.3 overall and in geography, and must have completed at least three semesters or five-quarters of college coursework.

== Notable members ==
- Barbara Bedette, paleontologist
- Rebecca Lave, professor of geography at Indiana University Bloomington
- Duane Nellis, president of Ohio University and Texas Tech University

== See also ==
- Honor cords
- Honor society
- List of geographical societies
- Professional fraternities and sororities
