= Critical realism (philosophy of the social sciences) =

Philosophical approach to understanding science

Critical realism is a philosophical approach to understanding science, and in particular social science, initially developed by Roy Bhaskar (1944–2014). It specifically opposes forms of empiricism and positivism by viewing science as concerned with identifying causal mechanisms. In the last decades of the twentieth century it also stood against various forms of postmodernism and post-structuralism by insisting on the reality of objective existence. In contrast to positivism's methodological foundation, and post-structuralism's epistemological foundation, critical realism insists that (social) science should be built from an explicit ontology. Critical realism is one of a range of types of philosophical realism, as well as forms of realism advocated within social science such as analytic realism and subtle realism.

== Main principles ==
A 2016 summary of what various accounts and versions of critical realism have in common, coauthored by nine scholars including Margaret Archer, Philip Gorski, Daniel Little, Christian Smith, and George Steinmetz, drew out four tenets:

- Ontological realism: Critical realists assert that "much of reality exists and operates independently of our awareness or knowledge of it", including social reality.
- Epistemic relativism: Our knowledge of reality is limited and fallible.
- Judgmental rationality: It is possible to judge that some accounts of social reality are better than others.
- Cautious ethical naturalism: Although the is–ought fallacy ought to be avoided, ethical values can be empirically studied.

=== Ontological realism ===
Proponents of critical realism believe an objective reality exists, but they understand this reality as layered. It includes both layers that are observable as well as hidden layers that shape the observable phenomena.

=== Epistemic relativism ===
Critical realists distinguish the transitive (epistemological) dimension and the intransitive (ontological) dimension. In the context of knowledge production, the "transitive object of knowledge" is the concepts used in "reference" to the world and the "intransitive object of knowledge" is the entity of the world that is referred to, the "referent". Depending on the context, a transitive object can become a intransitive object (e.g. a theory can itself be an object of study). This is because knowledge (the transitive) is part of the world rather than exterior to it.

For critical realists, knowledge is relative because all knowledge can potentially be wrong, but also because the definition of what is valuable knowledge can vary and is the product of history and the position of the knower. In addition, knowledge of the world is always mediated by existing stock of knowledge.

=== Judgemental rationality ===
The distinction they make between ontology (intransitive) and epistemology (transitive) allows critical realists to argue that it is possible to identify shared reference points to choose rationally among alternative theories and explanations.

=== Cautious ethical naturalism ===
Although it is not possible to infer a normative value from an empirical finding, it is still possible to use findings to draw conclusions about values. This is because values "have a 'factual' element to them". For example, if we assume that a social policy (which rests on certain values) should produce a particular change in society, then we can examine whether it actually does so. If the policy is effective, then, according to the values that motivated it, the policy should be continued.

== Contemporary critical realism ==
=== Overview ===
Bhaskar developed a general philosophy of science that he described as transcendental realism and a special philosophy of the human sciences that he called critical naturalism. The two terms were combined by other authors to form the umbrella term critical realism.

Transcendental realism attempts to establish that in order for scientific investigation to take place, the object of that investigation must have real, manipulable, internal mechanisms that can be actualized to produce particular outcomes. This is what we do when we conduct experiments. This stands in contrast to empiricist scientists' claim that all scientists can do is observe the relationship between cause and effect and impose meaning. Whilst empiricism, and positivism more generally, locate causal relationships at the level of events, critical realism locates them at the level of the generative mechanism, arguing that causal relationships are irreducible to empirical constant conjunctions of David Hume's doctrine; in other words, a constant conjunctive relationship between events is neither sufficient nor even necessary to establish a causal relationship.

The implication of this is that science should be understood as an ongoing process in which scientists improve the concepts they use to understand the mechanisms that they study. It should not, in contrast to the claim of empiricists, be about the identification of a coincidence between a postulated independent variable and dependent variable. Positivism and naive falsificationism are also rejected on the grounds that a mechanism may exist but either a) go unactivated, b) be activated, but not perceived, or c) be activated, but counteracted by other mechanisms, which results in its having unpredictable effects. Thus, non-realisation of a posited mechanism cannot (in contrast to the claim of some positivists) be taken to signify its non-existence. Falsificationism can be viewed at the statement level (naive falsificationism) or at the theorem level (more common in practice). In this way, the two approaches can be reconciled to some extent.

Critical naturalism argues that the transcendental realist model of science is equally applicable to both the physical and the human worlds. However, it argues, when we study the human world we are studying something fundamentally different from the physical world and must, therefore, adapt our strategy to studying it. Critical naturalism, therefore, prescribes social scientific methods which seek to identify the mechanisms producing social events, but with a recognition that these are in a much greater state of flux than those of the physical world (as human structures change much more readily than those of, say, a leaf). In particular, we must understand that human agency is made possible by social structures that themselves require the reproduction of certain actions/pre-conditions. Further, the individuals that inhabit these social structures are capable of consciously reflecting upon, and changing, the actions that produce them—a practice that is in part facilitated by social scientific research.

Critical realism has become an influential movement in British sociology and social science in general as a reaction to, and reconciliation of postmodern critiques.

=== Developments ===
Since Bhaskar made the first big steps in popularising the theory of critical realism in the 1970s, it has become one of the major strands of social scientific method, rivalling positivism/empiricism, and post-structuralism/relativism/interpretivism.

After his development of critical realism, Bhaskar went on to develop a philosophical system he calls dialectical critical realism, which is most clearly outlined in his weighty book, Dialectic: The Pulse of Freedom.

An accessible introduction to Bhaskar's writings was written by Andrew Collier. Andrew Sayer has written accessible texts on critical realism in social science. Danermark et al. have also produced an accessible account. Margaret Archer is associated with this school, as is the ecosocialist writer Peter Dickens.

David Graeber relies on critical realism, which he understands as a form of 'heraclitean' philosophy, emphasizing flux and change over stable essences, in his anthropological book on the concept of value, Toward an anthropological theory of value: the false coin of our own dreams.

Recently, attention has turned to the challenge of implementing critical realism in applied social research, including its use in studying organizations.). Other authors (Fletcher 2016, Parr 2015, Bunt 2018, Hoddy 2018) have discussed which specific research methodologies and methods are conducive (or not) to research guided by critical realism as a philosophy of science.

== Critical realist meta-theories ==
At its core, critical realism offers a theory of being and existence (ontology), but it takes a more open position in relation to the theory of knowledge (epistemology). As a result, a wide range of approaches have developed that seek to offer a framework for social research. Because they are not theories in specific disciplines nor theories relating to specific aspects of society, these approaches are generally known as 'meta-theories'. Critical realist meta-theories include: the transformational model of social activity, the morphogenetic approach, Cambridge social ontology, critical discourse analysis, cultural political economy, critical realist feminism, and critical realist Marxism.

=== The morphogenetic approach ===
The morphogenetic approach is a critical realist framework for analysing social change originally developed by Margaret Archer in her text Social Origins of Educational Systems and systematised in a trilogy of social theory texts, Culture and Agency (1988), Realist Social Theory (1995), and Being Human (2000). The approach was developed primarily as a critical realist response to the structure-agency problem in which "we are simultaneously free and constrained and we also have some awareness of it". At the centre of Archer's answer to this problem is 'analytical dualism', which entails an analytical separation of structure and agency so that the interaction between them can be studied and modelled by researchers; on this basis, Archer rejects alternative approaches that 'conflate' structure and agency into the single concept of 'practice', primarily directing her critique at Giddens' structuration theory. Archer extends the notion of analytical dualism to the distinction between "the material and the ideational aspects of social life", identifying 'culture' as a third fundamental aspect of society, alongside structure and agency. Therefore, the analysis of social change depends on modelling structure (S), agency (A), and culture (C), so that "social life comes in a SAC – always and everywhere". These concepts form the basis for the 'morphogenetic cycle', which splits social change into three processes: [T1] conditioning → [T2-T3] interaction → [T4] elaboration:

- At T1, agents (as individuals and as groups) are conditioned by the social structure and cultural system.
- From T2 to T3, agents act, react, and interact
- At T4, the social structure and cultural system are changed (morphogenesis) or maintained (morphostasis).

The morphogenetic approach has been advanced by Douglas Porpora, whose Reconstructing Sociology sought to introduce morphogenetic critical realism into the mainstream of American sociology. Before becoming explicitly aligned with the morphogenetic approach and critical realism, Porpora published two papers on the nature of culture and social structure that later had a major influence on morphogenetic critical realism.

=== Cambridge social ontology ===
Cambridge social ontology is an approach to ontology that is primarily associated with the work of philosopher Tony Lawson. The approach is centred on the Cambridge Social Ontology Group (CSOG) and its weekly Realist Workshop hosted by the University of Cambridge and led by Lawson. While the group subscribes to critical realism, it identifies its aims with the study of ontology more generally rather than a necessary allegiance with the critical realist philosophy. At the heart of the Cambridge approach is a theory of social positioning in which any social system creates roles (or 'places' or 'slots') that are occupied by individuals. Each of these roles is attached to a series of rights and obligations; for example, one of the rights of a university lecturer is the right to use a university library and one of their obligations to deliver lectures.

These rights and obligations interlock to form social structures, so that the rights of an individual in one social position usually correspond with the obligations of an individual in another; for example, the rights of the lecturer might correspond to the obligations of a librarian. In some cases, it is not individuals that occupy these social positions but 'communities', which are defined as "an identifiable, restricted and relatively enduring coherent grouping of people who share some set of concerns".

It is important to stress that these communities can exist at a wide range of scales, they are not necessarily attached to a particular geographical space, and they can overlap and nest in various complex ways. Therefore, individuals sit within social systems by occupying a role, and they sit within communities by sharing in the community's interests in some way. A final crucial concept of the Cambridge social ontology approach is the notion of 'collective practices': a collective practice is a way of proceeding that (implicitly) bears the status of being (collectively) accepted within a community. In other words, collective practices are common ways of acting in any given situation that are reinforced through conformity, such as the forming of queues to pay for goods in stores or the etiquette of a particular game or sport.

=== Critical discourse analysis ===
Discourse analysis is the analysis of texts and other meaningful signs with the purpose of understanding and/or explaining social phenomena. Critical discourse analysis (CDA) is primarily concerned with analysing the relationship between discourse and social relations of power in any given context. In contrast to post-structuralist and postmodernist approaches to discourse analysis (such as the Essex school), CDA relies on philosophical distinctions between discourse and other aspects of reality, especially insisting on the relative independence of power relations, material existence and individual agency. While not all CDA explicitly ascribes to critical realism (see, for example the work of Ruth Wodak or Teun van Dijk), a critical realist ontology provides philosophical underpinnings for the social distinctions inherent to its approach to analysis. The main proponent of a critical realist approach to CDA is Norman Fairclough, whose philosophical underpinnings shifted from a Foucauldian perspective in his 1992 book Discourse and Social Change to an explicitly critical realist approach in his 1999 collaboration with Lillian Chouliaraki Discourse in Late Modernity. Fairclough has subsequently published work developing the critical realist foundations of his version of CDA, particularly in collaboration with his Lancaster University colleagues Andrew Sayer and Bob Jessop. Fairclough explains how the main concepts of transcendental realism underpin his approach to the analysis of texts.

Firstly, there is a distinction between the knowledge (the 'transitive dimension') and that which knowledge is about (the 'intransitive dimension'); this underpins the CDA distinction between discourse and other aspects of reality. Secondly, there is the distinction between experienced events (the 'empirical'), events themselves (the 'actual'), and the underlying mechanisms that give rise to events (the 'real'); this underpins the distinction between the reading of a text (the empirical), the text itself (the actual) and the causal structures underpinning the text's social effects (the real). While these critical realist distinctions are not commonly used in the empirical application of Fairlcough's CDA, they are fundamental to the underlying social theory that justifies its application. More recently, other theorists have further developed CDA's critical realist underpinnings by focusing on the distinction between structure and agency, the distinction between discourse and 'non-discourse', and the concept of social practices.

=== Cultural political economy ===
Long-term collaborators Ngai-Ling Sum and Bob Jessop initially developed 'cultural political economy' (CPE) in a forum of the journal New Political Economy, responding to the strict disciplinarity of existing approaches to political economy. CPE also has roots in Jessop's seminal collaboration with Norman Fairclough and Andrew Sayer, which outlined a critical realist approach to 'semiosis', the inter-subjective production of meaning. CPE is most extensively outlined in Sum and Jessop's 2013 book Cultural Political Economy, where critical realism and the strategic-relational approach are identified as the twin foundations of the approach.

These foundations lead to a central distinction at the heart of CPE between the 'semiotic and structural aspects of social life'. The 'semiotic' entails (a) the process by which individuals come to understand, apprehend, and make sense of the natural and social world, and (b) the process by which people (individually and in groups) come to create meaning through communication and signification, especially (though not exclusively) through the formation and use of language. The semiotic is held to be foundational to all social relations and causally efficacious, so that it is both a part of social relations and a causal force in its own right. For the 'structural' aspects of social life, Sum and Jessop adopt the phrase 'structuration' from Anthony Giddens, but reject his broader approach because of its atemporality and its conflation of agents and their actions.

In CPE, as in all critical realist meta-theories, social structure is held to be socially constructed, embedded in semiosis, but also not reducible to those semiotic processes, having its own material existence in social institutions, the actions of individuals, and the physical world. Jessop explains that 'semiotic' and 'structural' aspects of social life change over time through three evolutionary mechanisms: (i) variation - there is constant variation in human practices and social arrangements, but especially at times of crisis; (ii) selection - some practices, semiotic constructions, and structural arrangements are selected, especially as the possible routes to recovery from a crisis; (iii) retention - from the selected arrangements and practices, those that prove to be effective are retained, especially when they help overcome a crisis. This process of variation-selection-retention is not a functionalist account in which society is continuously 'improving', because the process is shaped by the strategies of individual agents and social structures of (unequal) power.

=== Critical realist Marxism ===
A development of Bhaskar's critical realism lies at the ontological root of some contemporary streams of Marxist political and economic theory. These authors consider that realist philosophy described by Bhaskar in A Realist Theory of Science is compatible with Marx's work in that it differentiates between an intransitive reality, which exists independently of human knowledge of it, and the socially produced world of science and empirical knowledge. This dualist logic is present in the Marxian theory of ideology, according to which social reality may be very different from its empirically observable surface appearance.

Notably, Alex Callinicos has argued for a 'critical realist' ontology in the philosophy of social science and explicitly acknowledges Bhaskar's influence (while also rejecting the latter's 'spiritualist turn' in his later work). The relationship between critical realist philosophy and Marxism has also been discussed in an article co-authored by Bhaskar and Callinicos and published in the Journal of Critical Realism.

== Disciplinary applications ==
=== Economics ===
Heterodox economists like Tony Lawson, Lars Pålsson Syll, Frederic Lee or Geoffrey Hodgson have used the ideas of critical realism in economics, especially the dynamic idea of macro-micro interaction.

According to critical realist economists, the central aim of economic theory is to provide explanations in terms of hidden generative structures. This position combines transcendental realism with a critique of mainstream economics. It argues that mainstream economics (i) relies excessively on deductivist methodology, (ii) embraces an uncritical enthusiasm for formalism, and (iii) believes in strong conditional predictions in economics despite repeated failures.

The world that mainstream economists study is the empirical world. But according to critical realists this world is "out of phase" (Lawson) with the underlying ontology of economic regularities. The mainstream view is thus a limited reality because empirical realists presume that the objects of inquiry are solely "empirical regularities"—that is, objects and events at the level of the experienced.

The critical realist views the domain of real causal mechanisms as the appropriate object of economic science, whereas the positivist view is that the reality is exhausted in empirical, i.e. experienced reality. Tony Lawson argues that economics ought to embrace a "social ontology" to include the underlying causes of economic phenomena.

==== Ecological economics ====
The British ecological economist Clive Spash holds the opinion that critical realism offers a thorough basis—as a philosophy of science—for the theoretical foundation of ecological economics. He therefore uses a critical realist lens for conducting research in (ecological) economics.

However, also other scholars base ecological economics on a critical realist foundation, such as Leigh Price from Rhodes University.

=== Ecology, climate change and environmental sustainability ===
Critical realism's implications for ecology, climate change and environmental sustainability were explored by Roy Bhaskar and others in their 2010 book Interdisciplinarity and Climate Change: Transforming Knowledge and Practice for Our Global Future. Nordic ecophilosophers such as Karl Georg Høyer, Sigmund Kvaløy Setreng and Trond Gansmo Jakobsen saw the value of critical realism as a basis for the approach to ecology popularized by the Norwegian philosopher Arne Næss, versions of which are sometimes called deep ecology. Roy Bhaskar, Petter Næss, and Karl Høyer collaborated on an edited volume entitled Ecophilosophy in a World of Crisis: Critical Realism and the Nordic Contributions. Zimbabwean-born ecophilosopher Leigh Price has used critical realism to develop a philosophy for ecology that she calls deep naturalism, and she has argued for a common-sense approach to climate change and environmental management. She also has used Bhaskar's critical realist ontology to arrive at a definition of ecological resilience as "the process by which the internal complexity of an ecosystem and its coherence as a whole – stemming from the relative 'richness' or 'modularity' of emergent structures and behaviours/growth/life-history of species – results in the inter-dependencies of its components or their binding as totalities such that the identity of the ecosystem tends to remain intact, despite intrinsic and/or extrinsic entropic forces". Other academics in this field who have worked with critical realism include Jenneth Parker, Research Director at Schumaker Institute for Sustainable Systems and Sarah Cornell, Associate Professor at Stockholm Resilience Centre.

=== International relations ===
Since 2000, critical realist philosophy has also been increasingly influential in the field of international relations (IR) theory. In 2011, Iver B. Neumann said it was "almost all the rage" among those IR scholars who are concerned with questions of philosophy of science. Bob Jessop, Colin Wight, Milja Kurki, Jonathan Joseph and Hidemi Suganami have all published major works on the utility of beginning IR research from a critical realist social ontology—an ontology they all credit Roy Bhaskar with originating.

=== Education ===
Critical realism (CR) offers a framework that can be used to approach complex questions at the interface between educational theory and educational practice. Nevertheless, CR is not a theory but a philosophical approach intended to under-labour for social science research. As a meta-theory, it does not explain any social phenomenon. Instead, the processes and techniques of the discipline, in this case, education, will provide the means for translating CR principles into a substantive study. This means that for any study framed under a CR approach, there is a need to choose a social theory (that shares a realist ontology) that explains why things are the way they are rather than some other way. As in the different disciplines described above, in educational research under a CR approach, the overall aim is to explain the educational phenomena in terms of the hidden generative mechanisms that make the events we observe happen. Rebecca Eynon of the Oxford Internet Institute believes that when investigating issues in the field of educational technology it is fundamental to address the real problems that as she argues, relate to the more profound and most of the time, imperceptible structural issues that constrain technology use. In the field of educational technology, particularly when exploring how technology is used or appropriated by teachers and students, an understanding of the social world as complex and multi-layered is helpful. Clive Lawson of the Cambridge Social Ontology Group has addressed the topic of technology from a CR perspective.

The book Isolation and Technology (2017) sets out a persuasive 'ontology of technology' and applies this perspective to explain the causal powers of technology, which for educational purposes is highly relevant. His main argument is that technology has the power to enlarge human capabilities but only if the technology/artefact is enrolled in the network of interdependencies in a particular system. He suggests a conception of technical activity "as that activity that harnesses the causal capacities and powers of material artefacts in order to extend human capabilities" (p. 109).

David Scott has written extensively about CR and education. In his book Education, Epistemology and Critical Realism (2010), he argues for a need to pay greater attention to the meta-theories which underpin educational research. An important issue for educational research, Scott argues, is the relationship between structure and agency. The work of Margaret Archer uses the morphogenetic cycle (explained in one of the sections above) as an analytical tool that allows the researcher to explore the interplay between structure and agency at any given moment in time. She uses analytical dualism, a methodological manoeuvre that helps, only for the sake of analysis, to separate structure from agency to explore their interplay at a particular moment in time. The latter was utilised by Robert Archer in his book Education Policy and Realist Social Theory (2002).

=== Health ===
Critical realism has been used widely within health research in several different ways, including (i) informing methodological decisions, (ii) understanding the causes of health and illness, and (iii) informing ways of improving health—whether in healthcare programmes or public health promotion.

In a similar pattern to that seen in other fields, researchers studying health and illness have used critical realism to orient their methodological decisions. Critical realism has been argued to represent a philosophical approach for health sciences that is alternative and preferable to the empirical emphasis within positivism and the relativist emphasis within constructivism. Comparable arguments are made in a range of fields such as the sociology of health and illness, mental health research, and nursing. In the view of Wiltshire, use of critical realism to orient methodological decisions helps to encourage interdisciplinary health research by disrupting long-standing qualitative-quantitative divides between disciplinary traditions. Critical realism has also been discussed in comparison to alternatives within health and rehabilitation science; in this area, DeForge and Shaw concluded that, "critical realists tend to forefront ontological considerations and focus on the hidden, taken-for-granted structures from 'the domain of the real'." One significant methodological implication within health research has been the introduction of evaluation frameworks that are underpinned by critical realist ideas. Evaluation research is important for healthcare research in particular because new health-related interventions and programmes need to be assessed for effectiveness. Clark and colleagues summarise the contribution of critical realism in this domain by claiming that it is useful for

(1) understanding complex outcomes, (2) optimizing interventions, and (3) researching biopsychosocial pathways. Such questions are central to evidence-based practice, chronic disease management, and population health.

In a recent presentation, Alderson positions critical realism as a toolkit of practical ideas that helps researchers to extend and clarify their analyses.

Research that has tried to better understand the causes of health and illness have also turned to critical realism. Scambler has applied sociology to the understanding of medicine, health and illness, where he presents the role of class relations and political power in reproducing and exacerbating health inequalities. Other research into the social determinants of health has drawn on critical realism in understanding, for example, healthcare inequalities, the rural determinants of health, and the non-determinant causal relationship between poor housing and illness. Others have found critical realism useful in seeking an appropriate social theory of health determination through the complex pathways and mechanisms that come to impact health and illness. As well, critical realism has been used to advance an account of the causes of mental ill-health.

Critical realism has also been used in health research to inform ways of improving health—whether in healthcare programmes or public health promotion. Clark and colleagues argue critical realism can help to understand and evaluate heart health programmes, noting that their approach "embraces measurement of objective effectiveness but also examines the mechanisms, organizational and contextual-related factors causing these outcomes." It has also been used as an explanatory framework regarding health decisions, such as the use of home-dialysis for patients with chronic kidney disease. Another useful example in the context of nursing practice argues that critical realism offers a philosophy that is a natural fit with human and health science enquiry, including nursing. At the level of public health, Connelly has strongly advocated for critical realist ideas, concluding that "for health promotion theory and practice to make a difference an engagement with critical realism is now long overdue." Critical realism is also applied in empirical studies, such as ethnographic study in Nigeria arguing that understanding the underlying mechanisms associated with smoking in different societies will enable effective implementation of tobacco control policies that work in various settings.

=== Religion ===
Critical realism contributes to the study of religion by offering a stratified ontology that distinguishes between observable religious practices, institutional events, and the deeper generative mechanisms that shape them. Drawing on the philosophical foundations of Roy Bhaskar and the morphogenetic approach developed by Margaret Archer, it treats religion as an emergent reality arising from the interplay of structure, culture, and agency over time. This perspective allows researchers to move beyond reductionist explanations—whether purely materialist or purely interpretive—by recognizing both the causal power of religious institutions and the reflexivity of believers. Through analytical dualism and temporal sequencing, critical realism makes it possible to examine how religious traditions are reproduced or transformed across historical phases. In this way, it provides a robust explanatory framework for understanding religious continuity, conflict, and change in contemporary societies. Using this framework, Wojciech Sadlon has applied critical realism to the analysis of Polish Catholicism, interpreting post-communist transformations as morphogenetic processes rather than simple secular decline. His research shows how historical conditioning, institutional structures, and the reflexive responses of clergy and laity interact to produce differentiated patterns of religious participation and cultural change.

== See also ==
- Critical realism (philosophy of perception)
