= Philosophy of social science =

Study of the logic, methods, and foundations of social sciences

Philosophy of social science examines how social science integrates with other related scientific disciplines, which implies a rigorous, systematic endeavor to build and organize knowledge relevant to the interaction between individual people and their wider social involvement.

Scientific rationalism tried to dissociate logical transactions from the emotional motivation to so engage, which strategic and tactical objectives work together as heuristic strategies, some of which are explored below.

== Auguste Comte and positivism ==
Comte first described the epistemological perspective of positivism in The Course in Positive Philosophy, a series of texts published between 1830 and 1842. These texts were followed by the 1848 work, A General View of Positivism (published in English in 1865). The first three volumes of the Course dealt chiefly with the natural sciences already in existence (geoscience, astronomy, physics, chemistry, biology), whereas the latter two emphasised the inevitable coming of social science. Observing the circular dependence of theory and observation in science, and classifying the sciences in this way, Comte may be regarded as the first philosopher of science in the modern sense of the term. For him, the physical sciences had necessarily to arrive first, before humanity could adequately channel its efforts into the most challenging and complex "Queen science" of human society itself. His View of Positivism would therefore set out to define, in more detail, the empirical goals of sociological method.

Comte offered an account of social evolution, proposing that society undergoes three phases in its quest for the truth, according to a general "law of three stages". The idea bears some similarity to Marx's view that human society would progress toward a communist peak. This is perhaps unsurprising as both were profoundly influenced by the early Utopian socialist, Henri de Saint-Simon, who was at one time Comte's teacher and mentor. Both Comte and Marx intended to develop, scientifically, a new secular ideology in the wake of European secularisation.

The early sociology of Herbert Spencer came about broadly as a reaction to Comte. Writing after various developments in evolutionary biology, Spencer attempted (in vain) to reformulate the discipline in what we might now describe as socially Darwinistic terms (although Spencer was a proponent of Lamarckism rather than Darwinism).

The modern academic discipline of sociology began with the work of Émile Durkheim (1858–1917). While Durkheim rejected much of the detail of Comte's philosophy, he retained and refined its method, maintaining that the social sciences are a logical continuation of the natural ones into the realm of human activity, and insisting that they may retain the same objectivity, rationalism, and approach to causality. Durkheim set up the first European department of sociology at the University of Bordeaux in 1895. In the same year he argued, in The Rules of Sociological Method (1895): "[o]ur main goal is to extend scientific rationalism to human conduct... What has been called our positivism is but a consequence of this rationalism." Durkheim's seminal monograph Suicide (1897), a case study of suicide rates amongst Catholic and Protestant populations, distinguished sociological analysis from psychology or philosophy.

The positivist perspective, however, has been associated with 'scientism'; the view that the methods of the natural sciences may be applied to all areas of investigation, be it philosophical, social scientific, or otherwise. Among most social scientists and historians, orthodox positivism has long since fallen out of favor. Today, practitioners of both social and physical sciences recognize the distorting effect of observer bias and structural limitations. This scepticism has been facilitated by a general weakening of deductivist accounts of science by philosophers such as Thomas Kuhn, and new philosophical movements such as critical realism and neopragmatism. Positivism has also been espoused by 'technocrats' who believe in the inevitability of social progress through science and technology. The philosopher-sociologist Jürgen Habermas has critiqued pure instrumental rationality as meaning that scientific-thinking becomes something akin to ideology itself.

Durkheim, Marx, and Weber are more typically cited as the fathers of contemporary social science. In psychology, a positivistic approach has historically been favoured in behaviourism.

== Epistemology ==
In any discipline, there will always be a number of underlying philosophical predispositions in the projects of scientists. Some of these predispositions involve the nature of social knowledge itself, the nature of social reality, and the locus of human control in action. Intellectuals have disagreed about the extent to which the social sciences should mimic the methods used in the natural sciences. The founding positivists of the social sciences argued that social phenomena can and should be studied through conventional scientific methods. This position is closely allied with scientism, naturalism and physicalism; the doctrine that all phenomena are ultimately reducible to physical entities and physical laws. Opponents of naturalism, including advocates of the verstehen method, contended that there is a need for an interpretive approach to the study of human action, a technique radically different from natural science. The fundamental task for the philosophy of social science has thus been to question the extent to which positivism may be characterized as 'scientific' in relation to fundamental epistemological foundations. These debates also rage within contemporary social sciences with regard to subjectivity, objectivity, intersubjectivity and practicality in the conduct of theory and research. Philosophers of social science examine further epistemologies and methodologies, including realism, critical realism, instrumentalism, functionalism, structuralism, interpretivism, phenomenology, and post-structuralism.

Though essentially all major social scientists since the late 19th century have accepted that the discipline faces challenges that are different from those of the natural sciences, the ability to determine causal relationships invokes the same discussions held in science meta-theory. Positivism has sometimes met with caricature as a breed of naive empiricism, yet the word has a rich history of applications stretching from Comte to the work of the Vienna Circle and beyond. By the same token, if positivism is able to identify causality, then it is open to the same critical rationalist non-justificationism presented by Karl Popper, which may itself be disputed through Thomas Kuhn's conception of epistemic paradigm shift.

Early German hermeneuticians such as Wilhelm Dilthey pioneered the distinction between natural and social science ('Geisteswissenschaft'). This tradition greatly informed Max Weber and Georg Simmel's antipositivism, and continued with critical theory. Since the 1960s, a general weakening of deductivist accounts of science has grown side-by-side with critiques of "scientism", or 'science as ideology'. Jürgen Habermas argues, in his On the Logic of the Social Sciences (1967), that "the positivist thesis of unified science, which assimilates all the sciences to a natural-scientific model, fails because of the intimate relationship between the social sciences and history, and the fact that they are based on a situation-specific understanding of meaning that can be explicated only hermeneutically … access to a symbolically prestructured reality cannot be gained by observation alone." Verstehende social theory has been the concern of phenomenological works, such as Alfred Schütz's Phenomenology of the Social World (1932) and Hans-Georg Gadamer's Truth and Method (1960). Phenomenology would later prove influential in the subject-centred theory of the post-structuralists.

The mid-20th-century linguistic turn led to a rise in highly philosophical sociology, as well as so-called "postmodern" perspectives on the social acquisition of knowledge. One notable critique of social science is found in Peter Winch's Wittgensteinian text The Idea of Social Science and its Relation to Philosophy (1958). Michel Foucault provides a potent critique in his archaeology of the human sciences, though Habermas and Richard Rorty have both argued that Foucault merely replaces one such system of thought with another.

One underlying problem for the social psychologist is whether studies can or should ultimately be understood in terms of the meaning and consciousness behind social action, as with folk psychology, or whether more objective, natural, materialist, and behavioral facts are to be given exclusive study. This problem is especially important for those within the social sciences who study qualitative mental phenomena, such as consciousness, associative meanings, and mental representations, because a rejection of the study of meanings would lead to the reclassification of such research as non-scientific. Influential traditions like psychodynamic theory and symbolic interactionism may be the first victims of such a paradigm shift. The philosophical issues lying in wait behind these different positions have led to commitments to certain kinds of methodology which have sometimes bordered on the partisan. Still, many researchers have indicated a lack of patience for overly dogmatic proponents of one method or another.

Social research remains extremely common and effective in practise with respect to political institutions and businesses. Michael Burawoy has marked the difference between public sociology, which is focused firmly on practical applications, and academic or professional sociology, which involves dialogue amongst other social scientists and philosophers.

== Ontology ==
Structure and agency form an enduring debate in social theory: "Do social structures determine an individual's behaviour or does human agency?" In this context 'agency' refers to the capacity of individuals to act independently and make free choices, whereas 'structure' refers to factors which limit or affect the choices and actions of individuals (such as social class, religion, gender, ethnicity, and so on). Discussions over the primacy of structure or agency relate to the very core of social ontology ("What is the social world made of?", "What is a cause in the social world, and what is an effect?"). One attempt to reconcile postmodern critiques with the overarching project of social science has been the development, particularly in Britain, of critical realism. For critical realists such as Roy Bhaskar, traditional positivism commits an 'epistemic fallacy' by failing to address the ontological conditions which make science possible: that is, structure and agency itself.

== See also ==
- Hard and soft science
- Intercultural philosophy
- Philosophy of economics
- Philosophy of history
- Philosophy of psychology
- Political philosophy
- Positive economics
- Positivism dispute
- Social constructionism
- Social fact
- Social philosophy
- Sociology of sociology

== Bibliography ==
- Braybrooke, David (1986). Philosophy of Social Science. Prentice Hall. ISBN 0-13-663394-3.
- Bunge, Mario. 1996. Finding Philosophy in Social Science. New Haven, CT: Yale University Press.
- Hollis, Martin (1994). The Philosophy of Social Science: An Introduction. Cambridge. ISBN 0-521-44780-1.
- Little, Daniel (1991). Varieties of Social Explanation : An Introduction to the Philosophy of Social Science. Westview Press. ISBN 0-8133-0566-7.
- Rosenberg, Alexander (1995). Philosophy of Social Science. Westview Harper Collins.
- Kaldis, Byron (ed.) (2013) Encyclopedia of Philosophy and the Social Sciences, Sage

=== Journals ===
- Philosophy of the Social Sciences

=== Conferences ===
- Philosophy of Social Science Roundtable
- EUROPEAN NETWORK FOR THE PHILOSOPHY OF THE SOCIAL SCIENCES

=== Books ===
- Encyclopedia of Philosophy and the Social Sciences, Byron Kaldis, SAGE, 2013
- Philosophy of Social Science by Alexander Rosenberg
- The Philosophy of Social Science: An Introduction by Martin Hollis
- Contemporary Philosophy of Social Science: A Multicultural Approach by Brian Fay
- Philosophy of social science: the methods, ideals, and politics of social inquiry by Michael Root
