= Christian Smith (sociologist) =

American sociologist (born 1960)

- Born: Christian Stephen Smith; October 23, 1960 (age 65)

Academic background
- Education: Gordon College (BA); Harvard University (MA, PhD)
- Thesis: The Emergence of Liberation Theology (1990)
- Academic advisors: Daniel Bell, Steve Rytina, Harvey Cox, Kiku Adatto
- Influences: Alasdair MacIntyre; Charles Taylor; Michael Polanyi; Roy Bhaskar; Daniel Bell; Margaret Archer; Nicholas Wolterstorff; Aristotle

Academic work
- Discipline: Sociology
- Sub-discipline: Cultural sociology; environmental sociology; sociological theory; sociology of religion
- School or tradition: Critical realism
- Institutions: Gordon College; University of North Carolina at Chapel Hill; University of Notre Dame
- Notable ideas: Moralistic therapeutic deism
- Website: christiansmith.nd.edu

Christian Stephen Smith (born 1960) is an American sociologist who was formerly the William R. Kenan Jr. Professor of Sociology at the University of Notre Dame. Smith's research focuses primarily on religion in modernity, adolescents and emerging adults, sociological theory, philosophy of science, the science of generosity, American evangelicalism, and culture. Smith is known for his contributions to the sociology of religion, particularly his research into adolescent spirituality, as well as for his contributions to sociological theory and his advocacy of critical realism.

== Early life and education ==
Smith was born on October 23, 1960. He attended Wheaton College (1978–1979) and received his Bachelor of Arts degree in sociology from Gordon College in 1983. Smith earned his Master of Arts (1987) and Doctor of Philosophy (1990) degrees from Harvard University, where he also spent a year studying theology at Harvard Divinity School.

== Career ==
Smith began his academic career as an instructor, and then assistant professor at Gordon College. In 1994 he joined University of North Carolina at Chapel Hill where he was an assistant professor, full professor, and then Stuart Chapin Professor of Sociology. He remained at North Carolina for 12 years before moving to Notre Dame as the William R. Kenan, Jr. Professor of Sociology and Founding Director of the Center for the Study of Religion and Society. He is also a Faculty Fellow of the Kroc Institute for Peace Studies. Smith has been awarded more than $20 million worth of research grants from the Pew Charitable Trusts, Lilly Endowment Inc., the John Templeton Foundation, the Templeton Religion Trust, and other foundations and institutes.

Smith resigned from his position at Notre Dame at the end of 2025, his essay on the reasons for his resignation provoking considerable debate.

== Awards and honors ==
In 2007, Smith's alma mater, Gordon College, presented him with the "Alumnus of the Year" award in "recognition of his many accomplishments and work as one of the leading Christian sociologists in the country."

In December, Choice Magazine selected What Is a Person? as one of its Top 25 (out of 7000 reviewed) Outstanding Academic Titles of 2011. The book also received the "Cheryl Frank Memorial Prize for 2010," from the International Association for Critical Realism. Smith received for the same book the 2011 Honorable Mention Award for Professional and Scholarly Excellence from American Publisher’s, Philosophy category.

He was awarded the Lilly Fellows Program Distinguished Book Award in 2011 for his 2009 book, co-authored with Patricia Snell, Souls in Transition: the Religious and Spiritual Lives of Emerging Adults. He was also awarded Christianity Today's 2010 Distinguished Book Award for the same book, Souls in Transition. He previously won Christianity Today's 2005 Distinguished Book Award for his 2005 book, co-authored with Melinda Lundquist Denton, Soul Searching: the Religious and Spiritual Lives of American Teenagers.

In 2012, the American Sociological Association section on Altruism, Morality, and Social Solidarity awarded Smith with the Distinguished Career Award.

== Moralistic therapeutic deism ==
In his 2005 book Soul Searching: The Religious and Spiritual Lives of American Teenagers co-written with Melinda Lundquist Denton, he introduced the term moralistic therapeutic deism (abbreviated MTD) to describe the common religious beliefs exhibited by American youth in a survey. It has also been referred to as egonovism. The book summarized the "National Study of Youth and Religion", privately funded by the Lilly Endowment.

They label moralistic therapeutic deism as a religion with the following traits:

1. A God exists who created and ordered the world and watches over human life on earth.
2. God wants people to be good, nice, and fair to each other, as taught in the Bible and by most world religions.
3. The central goal of life is to be happy and to feel good about oneself.
4. God does not need to be particularly involved in one's life except when God is needed to resolve a problem.
5. Good people go to heaven when they die.

== Critical realism ==
Critical realism, as a philosophy of (social) science (not a sociological theory per se), offers an alternative to the problems and limits presented by positivist empiricism, hermeneutical interpretivism, strong social constructionism, and postmodernist deconstruction.

Smith's work in CR involves What is a Person? Rethinking Humanity, Social Life, and the Moral Good from the Person Up (Chicago 2010) (with Moral, Believing Animals (OUP 2003) forming a pre-CR theoretical backdrop); To Flourish or Destruct: A Personalist Theory of Human Goods, Motivations, Failure, and Evil (Chicago 2014), and Religion: What it Is, How it Works, and Why it Matters (Princeton 2017).

== Personal life ==
Smith was born and raised an evangelical, but in 2010 he and his wife Emily converted to Catholicism.

== Selected publications ==
- The Emergence of Liberation Theology: Radical Religion and Social Movement Theory (1991) (Chicago)
- Resisting Reagan: The U.S. Central America Peace Movement (1996) (Chicago)
- American Evangelicalism: Embattled and Thriving (1998), with Michael Emerson, Sally Gallagher, Paul Kennedy, and David Sikkink (Chicago)
- Christian America?: What Evangelicals Really Want (2000) (California)
- Divided by Faith: Evangelical Religion and the Problem of Race in America (2000), with Michael Emerson (Oxford)
- Moral, Believing Animals: Human Personhood and Culture (2003) (Oxford)
- The Secular Revolution (2003) (California)
- Soul Searching: the Religious and Spiritual Lives of American Teenagers (2005), with Melinda Lundquist Denton (Oxford)
- Passing the Plate: Why American Christians Do Not Give Away More Money (2008) (Oxford)
- Souls in Transition: The Religious and Spiritual Lives of Emerging Adults (2009), with Patricia Snell (Oxford)
- What Is a Person?: Rethinking Humanity, Social Life, and the Moral Good from the Person Up (2010) (Chicago)
- The Bible Made Impossible: Why Biblicism Is Not a Truly Evangelical Reading of Scripture (2011) (Brazos)
- How to Go From Being a Good Evangelical to a Committed Catholic in 95 Difficult Steps (2011) (Cascade)
- Lost in Transition: The Dark Side of Emerging Adulthood (2011) (Oxford)
- The Sacred Project of American Sociology (2014) (Oxford University Press)
- To Flourish or Destruct: A Personalist Theory of Human Goods, Motivations, Failure, and Evil (2015) (Chicago)
- Religion: What it Is, How it Works, and Why it Matters (2017) (Princeton)
- Religious Parenting: Transmitting Faith and Values in Contemporary America (with Bridget Ritz and Michael Rotolo) (2019) (Princeton)
- Handing Down the Faith: How Parents Pass Their Religion on to the Next Generation (2021) (Oxford).
- Why Religion Went Obsolete: The Demise of Traditional Faith in America (2025) (Oxford).
