= Rajani Kannepalli Kanth =

American economist and philosopher

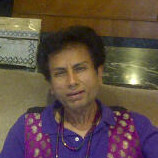
Rajani Kannepalli Kanth

Rajani Kannepalli Kanth is a professor, economist, philosopher, and social thinker. Though born in India, he is a U.S. citizen and has resided overseas for most of his life. His major research interests lie in the fields of Economics, Social Theory and Policy, and Women's Issues. His works have received positive endorsements from iconic intellectuals such as Ravi Batra, Roy Bhaskar, Noam Chomsky, Geoff Harcourt, Robert Heilbroner, John M. Hobson, Jonathan Joseph, Tony Lawson, Ali Mazrui, John McMurtry, Roger Owen, Warren Samuels, Gayatri Chakravorty Spivak, Paul Sweezy, and Immanuel Wallerstein. He has, across plus-three decades, taught in the areas of Anthropology, Sociology, Political Science, History, Economics, and Philosophy. He currently serves as the Trustee of the World Peace Congress that he founded in Salt Lake City, Utah, in 2007. He has also served as an advisor to the United Nations in New York, aside from being on the faculty of major universities around the world.

== Life and education ==
He grew up in Madras, India. He has studied at various institutions in India and overseas, such as St. George's College, Loyola College, the Delhi School of Economics, Columbia University, and the New School for Social Research. He holds a bachelor's degree in Economics/Statistics/Politics, a Master's in Sociology, a second Master's in Economics, and a Ph.D. in Economics.

He has been married, and divorced, twice. He has four daughters, two from each marriage, all living in the USA.

=== The World Peace Congress ===
He founded the World Peace Congress in Salt Lake City in 2007, holding its first Congress. It has since held two further Congresses – in India, and in Thailand. He continues to serve as its Trustee. A poem of his, set to backdrop music, named Millennium, offers his rationale for launching the World Peace Congress.

== Academic career ==
He commenced his academic career teaching political sociology at the newly inaugurated Jawaharlal Nehru University, after obtaining a master's degree in social anthropology from the Delhi School of Economics, in New Delhi in 1971. In 1974, he attended Columbia University, from which he transferred to the New School for Social Research, New York in 1975. In 1979, he taught as Economics Faculty at the UN International School in New York, and at St. John’s University, as well as serving as a teaching fellow at the New School for Social Research. That same Year he earned his second master's, in economics, whilst also serving as a research associate at Columbia University, following it up with a Ph.D. in economics in 1980. His Ph.D. thesis was published as a book titled Political Economy and Laissez-Faire in 1986. After a stint as economic advisor to the United Nations, at the UNFPA, and also the Centre for Transnational Corporations in New York, between 1979–1981, he returned to the academy, joining the State University of New York, at Purchase, where he taught from 1981–1985. From there on, he went on to accept positions in a multitude of Institutions: Providence College, the University of Utah, Oxford University, UK, Bielefeld University, Germany, University of Bremen, Germany, the University of Aarhus (Denmark), the University of New South Wales (Australia), the University of Technology, Australia, Wagner College, New York, the National University of Singapore, Duke University, the University of Massachusetts Amherst, Tufts University, Loras College, Washington College, Bard College, and Harvard University (where he served as a visiting scholar in Economics in 1998, Fellow in the Center for Middle Eastern Studies 2007–2010, associate of the Department of Anthropology 2010–2011, Fellow in the Department of Anthropology 2011–2014, visiting scholar in English 2014–2015) amongst others. In April–May 2012, he visited Jawaharlal Nehru University, India, as a Fellow of the Institute for Advanced Studies.

=== Major theories ===
Rajani Kanth's major philosophical theories include:

a) that Ricardian economics was merely policy advocacy in theoretical guise,

b) that Economics is the crown jewel of the hegemonic ideology of Modernism,

c) that European Modernism, whose derivates are capitalism and socialism, is the real grey eminence that has crafted the alienated misery of our epoch,

d) that we need to "break with the enlightenment" to escape the modernist cage,

e) that gender struggles far predate class and other struggles, with women's oppression being the original paradigm of power and domination, and define the "degree of civilization" of a societal form,

f) that men and women are distinct sub-species embodying a "paradigm of masculinity" and a "paradigm of femininity", respectively, correlated to violence and nurturance, that are basically instinctual in nature despite their cultural variation,

g) that we are, as hominids, basically tribal beings with clan and family being the surrogates for herd and pack in the animal world, of which we are a part,

h) that all our utopias founder on the rock of masculine drives for domination,

i) that only tribal society based on affective ties has managed to contain the predations of masculine drives within the healing matrix of kinship: and remains our best template of a modest amelioration.

== Publications ==
External videos
- The Challenge of Eurocentrism and Beyond Eurocentrism, YouTube video
- Rajani Kannepalli Kanth's Keynote Address at the First World Peace Congress, YouTube video

=== Academic ===
- Kanth, Rajani Kannepalli (1986). Political Economy and Laissez-Faire: Economics and Ideology in the Ricardian Era. New Jersey: Rowman & Littlefield Publishers. ISBN 978-0-8476-7488-6. OL 2548348M.
- Kanth, Rajani Kannepalli (1991). Explorations in Political Economy. New Jersey: Rowman and Littlefield. ISBN 978-0-8476-7617-0.
- Kanth, Rajani Kannepalli (1992). Capitalism and Social Theory: The Science of Black Holes. New York: M E Sharpe Inc. ISBN 978-1-56324-069-0.
- Kanth, Rajani Kannepalli (1994). Paradigms in Economic Development: Classic Perspectives, Critiques, and Reflections. New York: M E Sharpe Inc. ISBN 978-1-56324-330-1.
- Kanth, Rajani Kannepalli (1997). Against Economics: Rethinking Political Economy. London: Avebury. ISBN 978-1-85972-610-5.
- Kanth, Rajani Kannepalli (1997). Breaking with the Enlightenment: The Twilight of History and the Rediscovery of Utopia. New Jersey: Humanity Books. ISBN 978-1-57392-393-4.
- Kanth, Rajani Kannepalli (2005). Against Eurocentrism: A Transcendent Critique of Modernist Science, Society, and Morals. New York: Palgrave Macmillan. ISBN 978-1-4039-6737-4.
- Kanth, Rajani Kannepalli (2009). The Challenge of Eurocentrism: Global Perspectives, Policy, and Prospects. New York: Palgrave Macmillan. ISBN 978-0-230-61227-3.
- Towards Immediacy in World Peace: Papers and Proceedings of the World Peace Congress. Aakar Books.
- Kanth, Rajani Kannepalli (2013). The Post-Human Society: Elemental Contours of the Aesthetic Economy of the United States. Seattle: CreateSpace. ISBN 978-1-4903-1540-9.

=== Literary ===
- Amazon. The 'Forever Young' Regime. CreateSpace Independent Publishing Platform. ISBN 1484095413.
- Revue: A Boutique of Verse. CreateSpace. 2013. ISBN 978-1484819586.
- The Matter With Danny. Amazon. May 2013. ISBN 978-1484843147.
- Kanth, Rajani Kannepalli (May 2013). The Last Journey: A Voyage to the Center of the Soul. CreateSpace Independent Publishing Platform. ISBN 978-1484843215.

=== Articles ===
- Kanth, Rajani (1994). Paradigms in Economic Development: Classic Perspectives, Critiques, and Reflections. New York: M.E. Sharpe. pp. 255–259. ISBN 978-1-56324-330-1.
- Kanth, Rajani (1998). "Against Eurocentred epistemologies: a critique of science, realism and economics". In Fleetwood, Steve (ed.). Critical Realism in Economics: Development and Debate. Routledge. pp. 187–208. doi:10.4324/9780203455807.ch11. ISBN 978-0-415-19567-6.
- Joseph, Jonathan (2007). Realism Discourse and Deconstruction. New York: Routledge. pp. 171–179. ISBN 978-0-415-43686-1.

=== Major lectures ===
- Kanth, Rajani Kannepalli (2009). The Challenge of Eurocentrism: Global Perspectives, Policy and Prospects. New York: Macmillan. p. 237. ISBN 978-0-230-61227-3.
- Kanth, Rajani Kannepalli (2009). The Challenge of Eurocentrism: Global Perspectives, Policy and Prospects. New York: Macmillan. p. 1. ISBN 978-0-230-61227-3.

== Reception ==
"Rajani K. Kanth and Eurocentrism: A Critique" by Nick Hostettler

"A Voyage into America – Discovering the New Wretched of the Earth" by John M. Hobson

"A review of Breaking With The Enlightenment: The Twilight of History and the Rediscovery of Utopia" by Alex Prichard

=== Awards and honors ===
He was honored with a Festschrift at the American Economic Association Meetings in Chicago, January 4, 2007. He received a Curriculum Development Award at the University of Utah and a Rural Utah Research Award on the Status of Utah Women in 1991/92. He won a College Medal at Loyola College.
