= A. H. Halsey =

British sociologist (1923-2014)

Albert Henry "Chelly" Halsey (13 April 1923 – 14 October 2014) was a British sociologist. He was emeritus Professor of Social and Administrative Studies at the Department of Social Policy and Intervention, University of Oxford, and a Fellow of Nuffield College, Oxford.

Halsey 'worked in what he called the "political arithmetic" tradition throughout his career, with the dual tasks of documenting the state of society, and addressing social and political issues through "experimental social administration"'

He presented the BBC's annual Reith Lectures in 1978.

== Education ==
Halsey was an adviser for Anthony Crosland; and on education played an '"activist" role in policy development in the UK and internationally, through his work on educational reform...and as research adviser to Crosland at the DES with the introduction of comprehensive schooling in the UK'.

Generally accepted has been 'A. H. Halsey's assertion that in capitalist industrial societies "It is inevitable that the educational system should come into close relationship with the economy."'

== Social consensus ==
'Halsey's creed of "ethical socialism" springs from a lasting Anglican belief. His background was not just working class, but respectable working class'.

Despite a hankering for social consensus in Britain, "as Halsey confesses, such a consensus became more difficult to sustain as the twentieth century proceeded; unfortunately the 'bases of social integration in Christian belief, national and imperial success, localised kinship and collective self-help institutions...were all to decay.'"

== The Reith Lectures ==
In 1977, the BBC invited Halsey to present its annual Reith Lectures. Across a series of six radio lectures, titled "Change in British Society" and broadcast from 11. January 1978, he explored a sociological perspective on contemporary Britain. The lectures examined topics such as class, status, the rise of organisations, the nuclear family and fraternity.

== Selected works by Halsey ==
- Education, Economy, and Society: A Reader in the Sociology of Education (1961)
- Trends in British Society since 1900: A Guide to the Changing Social Structure of Britain (1972)
- Heredity and Environment (1977)
- Change in British Society BBC Reith Lectures (1978)
- Decline of Donnish Dominion: The British Academic Professions in the Twentieth Century (1992)
- No Discouragement: An Autobiography (1996)
- A History of Sociology in Britain (2004, Oxford University Press)

== Selected works co-authored by Halsey and others ==
- The British Academics (1971), co-authored with Martin A. Trow
- Social Class and Educational Opportunity (1973), co-authored with J. E. Floud and F. M. Martin
- Power and Ideology in Education (1977), co-authored with Jerome Karabel
- English Ethical Socialism (1988), co-authored with Norman Dennis.
- Twentieth-Century British Social Trends (2000), co-authored with Josephine Webb

== See also ==
- Sociology of sociology
