= Ngai-Ling Sum =

British sociologist and political economist

Ngai-Ling Sum PhD, MSocSc, MEd, MA
- 岑艾玲
- Other name

Chinese name
- Traditional Chinese: 岑艾玲
Transcriptions
Standard Mandarin
- Hanyu Pinyin: Cén Àilíng
Yue: Cantonese
- Jyutping: Sam^{4} Ngaai^{6}-ling^{4}
- Title: Honorary Researcher

Academic background
- Education: Lancaster University
- Thesis: Reflections on Accumulation, Regulation, the State, and Societalization: A stylized model of East Asian capitalism and an integral economic analysis of Hong Kong (1994)

Academic work
- Discipline: Sociology
- Website: https://www.lancaster.ac.uk/sociology/people/ngai-ling-sum

Ngai-Ling Sum (born 1952) is a British sociologist and political economist and co-director of the Cultural Political Economy Research Centre at Lancaster University.

== Career ==
Her 2006 book Beyond the Regulation Approach. Putting Capitalist Economies in their Place (co-authored with Bob Jessop) was awarded the Gunnar Myrdal Prize awarded given by the European Association for Evolutionary Political Economy. Geografiska Annaler called the book a good introduction to the theory of Regulation Approach. Sum's contributions to the book were considered "central in pushing its boundaries to the emerging project of cultural political economy" by Ray Hudson in Economic Geography.

She also was awarded a British Academy BARDA Award in 2008 for her work with Jessop on Changing Cultures of Competitiveness: A Cultural Political Economy Approach. Her work has appeared in several academic journals like Competition & Change, Urban Studies, New Political Economy, Critical Policy Studies, Critical Asian Studies, Economy and Society, and Capital & Class, among others.

== Major works ==
- Sum, Ngai-Ling (2003). "Rethinking Globalisation: Re-articulating the Spatial Scale and Temporal Horizons of Trans-Border Spaces". In Brenner, Neil; Jessop, Bob; Jones, Martin; et al. (eds.). State/Space: A Reader. Oxford: Blackwell Publishing. ISBN 978-0631230335.
- Beyond the Regulation Approach. Putting Capitalist Economies in their Place (co-authored with Bob Jessop) Cheltenham: Edward Elgar 2006.
- Towards A Cultural Political Economy. Putting Culture in its Place in Political Economy (co-authored with Bob Jessop) Cheltenham: Edward Elgar 2014.
