= Donna Freitas =

American academic and author (born 1972)

- Education: Georgetown University, Catholic University of America
- Occupations: Writer, scholar
- Notable work: Sex & the Soul (2008); Consent on Campus: A Manifesto (2018); Consent: A Memoir of Unwanted Attention (2019)
- Website: https://www.donnafreitas.com/

Donna Freitas (/ˈfreɪtəs/; born 1972) is a scholar, teacher, writer, and author of fiction and non-fiction for both adults and teenagers. Born in Rhode Island, the most Catholic state in the United States, Freitas's Catholic religion and spirituality inform much of her written work. Her writing also addresses sexuality, consent, and college campus culture.

== Early life and education ==
Freitas was a gymnast for seven years, but at age 15 she retired because of injuries. She received a B.A. in philosophy and Spanish from Georgetown University. She received her Ph.D. in religion from Catholic University of America.

== Career ==
=== Academic institution positions ===
Freitas taught at Boston University in the Department of Religion, St. Michael's College in Religion, and Hofstra University in the Honors College. She has lectured at over 200 college campuses about sexual assault.

She currently serves as a research affiliate at the University of Notre Dame's Center for the Study of Religion and Society.

=== Writing ===
Sex & the Soul: Juggling Sexuality, Spirituality, Romance, and Religion on America's College Campuses (2008) addresses the connections between sexuality and spirituality/religion at seven U.S. universities and colleges, including non-religious public, secular private, Catholic private, and evangelical private institutions. Her research included numerous interviews as well as an online survey, with more than 2,500 responses. 111 students were interviewed: 48 men and 63 women. Freitas concluded that the largest conflicts between sexuality and spirituality are between evangelical and non-evangelical institutions, rather than between religious and non-religious ones. She notes how students enrolled in Catholic institutions responded similarly to those at non-religious institutions. Overall, students did not find that their sexuality and spirituality/religion informed each other very much. On the other hand, she discovered that students in evangelical institutions made conscious efforts to reconcile their sexuality with their spirituality/religion, perhaps because they more often self-identified as religious and spiritual. Sex & the Soul was the first major study to investigate young people's attempts at reconciling spirituality and sexuality.

In Consent on Campus: A Manifesto (2018), Freitas explores the widespread problem of sexual assault on college campuses, which she mainly attributes to a failure of colleges and universities to adequately educate students about sex, consent, and "hookup culture". She aims to provide comprehensive training about consent, and proposes ways to have constructive conversations on the subject. She argues that consensual sex must be communicative. Despite her focus on the inability of large, tradition-bound universities to quickly respond to problems, she is optimistic "that institutions can implement policies to help their students navigate sex responsibly and safely."

In a follow-up book titled Consent: A Memoir of Unwanted Attention (2019), Freitas offers a personal background for why she became interested in the problem of consent on campuses. In the 1990s at Catholic University of America, a professor and priest ("Father L") sexually harassed Freitas. This book details how his mentorship changed into harassment and stalking, and how her university's administration did little to help her.

== Works ==
=== Fiction ===
- The Possibilities of Sainthood (2008) ISBN 9780374360870
- This Gorgeous Game (2010) ISBN 9780374314729
- The Survival Kit (2011) ISBN 9780374399177
- Gold Medal Summer (2012) ISBN 9780545327886
- Gold Medal Winter (2014) ISBN 9780545643771
- The Tenderness of Thieves (2015) ISBN 9780399171369
- Unplugged (2016) ISBN 9780062118615
- The Body Market (2017) ISBN 9780062118646
- The Mind Virus (2017) ISBN 9780062118660
- The Healer (2018) ISBN 9780062662118
- The Nine Lives of Rose Napolitano (2021) ISBN 9781984880598
- Her One Regret (2025) ISBN 9781641296380

=== Non-fiction ===
- Becoming a Goddess of Inner Poise: Spirituality for the Bridget Jones in All of Us (2003) ISBN 9780787976286
- Killing the Imposter God: Philip Pullman's Spiritual Imagination in His Dark Materials (2007) ISBN 9780787982379
- Sex & the Soul: Juggling Sexuality, Spirituality, Romance, and Religion on America's College Campuses (2008) ISBN 9780190221287
- The End of Sex: How Hookup Culture is Leaving a Generation Unhappy, Sexually Unfulfilled, and Confused About Intimacy (2013) ISBN 9780465002153
- Consent on Campus: A Manifesto (2018) ISBN 9780190671150
- Consent: A Memoir of Unwanted Attention (2019) ISBN 9780316450522
- The Happiness Effect: How Social Media is Driving a Generation to Appear Perfect at Any Cost (2019) ISBN 9780190239855
- Wishful Thinking: How I Lost My Faith and Why I Want to Find It (2024) ISBN 9781546004585
