= World Peace Congress =

Non-governmental organization

- Logo, 2012
- Formation: 2007
- Founder: Rajani Kannepalli Kanth

The World Peace Congress, founded by Professor Rajani Kannepalli Kanth in 2007, is a non-governmental organization dedicated to constructing an institutional basis for world peace, unmediated by state, government or politics.

The Congress holds conferences and dialogues, regularly, attended by people with various backgrounds. These dialogues produced resolutions adopted initially at the first Congress in Salt Lake City, to ultimately achieve the goal of the Congress - to renounce war as a means of social and political policy.

Later on, the World Peace Congress asked the United Nations to declare war as illegal by sending the Renunciation of War Resolution, resolutions adopted at the third World Peace Thai Congress in 2010, to UN Secretary-General, Ban Ki-moon, requesting him to ask all Heads of States of the UN to adopt the resolutions by suitably amending their individual Constitutions, or by enacting a special law by their legislatures.

Since its foundation, the World Peace Congress has a wide range of participants, including Martin Almada, Shabana Azmi, A. Balasubramaniam, Roy Bhaskar, Oliver DeMille, Robert Jensen, Yinhe Li, Rajiv Malhotra, Ruth Manorama, N. Radhakrishnan, Sulak Sivaraksa, Tenzin Tethong, and John Zerzan.

== History ==
=== The First Congress ===
The World Peace Congress was instituted in Salt Lake City, Utah, in 2007. The first Congress was held in Salt Lake City, the United States from August 24 to 26, 2007. Participants, including social activists, scholars, artists, politicians, and lay people, gathered together to discuss ways for the realization of world peace and drafted the Congress 2007 Resolutions as the basis for the future quest for peace.

=== The Second Congress ===
The Second Congress was held in Bangalore, India from February 27 to March 1, 2009. It sought to build upon the Resolutions of Congress 2007 and, in particular, to devise peace-oriented grassroots projects worldwide.

=== The Third Congress ===
The Third Congress was held in Thailand from July 9 to 11, 2010. Panelists participated in further discussions about the quest for world peace and, collectively, constructed the Congress 2010 Resolutions.

== World Peace Congress Sponsored Events ==
=== The WPC Health/Medicine Workshop ===
The World Peace Congress held a three-day Medicine Workshop from June 2 to 4, 2012 in Thailand. The workshop's purpose was to educate the public in non-allopathic methods of healing. The workshop was facilitated by Morkeaw (Jaipetch Klajon), a natural medicine practitioner, and was attended by 130 participants.

== Important Documents ==
=== Resolution Renouncing War ===
This key Resolution of the World Peace Congress, emanating from the Third Congress in Thailand in 2010, points out the ubiquity of war after the signing of UN Charter (in the City of San Francisco on 26 June 1945), the Preamble to which states that members of the United Nations are "determined to save succeeding generations from the scourge of war.” To re-focus attention to world peace and help accomplish this goal set by UN Charter, the World Peace Congress unanimously approved this Resolution and asked the United Nations, via a communication to its Secretary General, to similarly endorse the declaration renouncing “War as an instrument of State Policy.” This objective is to be further advanced by positive policies and practices in the form of educational aids, media events, and other promotions organized by the World Peace Congress collaborators worldwide.

=== The Congress 2007 Resolutions ===
Participants of the World Peace Congress assembled in Salt Lake City, Utah in August 2007, and formulated Resolutions for a global action plan to ensure world peace. These Resolutions derived from the labors of twelve panels covering varied topics such as gender, culture, kinship /community, et al.

=== The Congress 2010 Resolutions ===
The Congress 2012 Resolutions followed the lead established by the 2007 Resolutions: however, they proposed even more detailed action plans geared towards world peace. These Resolutions, produced in similar fashion to the 2007 Resolutions, were submitted by 10 panels with different themes, with one panel specifically focused on the then extant Thai Crisis.

== See also ==
- Conflict resolution
