= Transcendental realism =

Initially developed by Roy Bhaskar in his book A Realist Theory of Science (1975), transcendental realism is a philosophy of science that was initially developed as an argument against epistemic realism of positivism and hermeneutics. The position is based on Bhaskar's transcendental arguments for certain ontological and epistemological positions based on what reality must be like in order for scientific knowledge to be possible.

The overview of transcendental realism that follows is largely based on Andrew Sayer's Realism and Social Science.

== Transitive and intransitive domains ==
A Realist Theory of Science starts with a proposed paradox: how it is that people create knowledge as a product of social activities and at the same time knowledge is 'of' things that are not produced by people at all.

The former is inspired by Kuhnian arguments of how scientific communities develop knowledge and asserts all observation is theory-laden based on previously acquired concepts. As such, it is not a naïve realist perspective that knowledge is a direct acquisition of facts through observation of the real world, but rather that knowledge is fallible. This ontological position is described as the transitive domain of knowledge, in that knowledge can change over time.

The second part of the paradox is asserted to be based on a real world, which exists and behaves in the same manner regardless of whether or not people exist or whether they know about the real world. This is described as the intransitive domain of knowledge. Reducing ontology to epistemology is referred to as the epistemic fallacy, a fallacy that Bhaskar asserts has been made repeatedly over the last 300 years of philosophy of science.

== Real, actual, and empirical ==
The exposition of transcendental realism continues that not only is the world divided into a real world and our knowledge of it, but it is further divided into the real, the actual and the empirical. The real is the intransitive domain of things that exist (i.e. the real world): objects, their structures and their causal powers. Even though these objects and structures may be able to perform certain action, those actions may go unrealized. This gives rise to the actual, which is the events that actually occur, regardless of whether or not people are aware of them. The empirical contains the events that people have actually experienced.

== Stratification and emergence ==
Transcendental realism further argues for a stratified reality. The relationships between objects and the combinations of their causal powers may create entirely new structures with new causal powers. The typical example of this is of water, which has a causal power of extinguishing fire, but is made up of hydrogen and oxygen that have causal powers of combustion. This stratification spans through all sciences: physics, chemistry, biology, sociology, etc. This implies that objects in sociology – labor markets, capitalism, etc. – are just as real as that of physics. This is not a reductionist position: while each stratum is dependent on the objects and their relationships in the strata below it; the difference in causal powers means that they are necessarily different objects.

== Causality and mechanisms ==
Other philosophies of science based on the Humean tradition assert that causality is based on regularity among sequences of events. For transcendental realism, this explanation of causation holds little weight — "what causes something to happen has nothing to do with the number of times we have observed it happening".{Sayer, 2000, p.14} Instead of referring to events, transcendental realism refers to causal mechanisms, the internal processes of objects which give rise to events. These mechanisms may lie dormant or may counteract each other and prevent events from occurring.

== See also ==
- Critical naturalism
