= Ronald Barnett =

British philosopher of education (born 1947)

Ronald Barnett (born 1947) is a philosopher, theorist and analyst of higher education. He is emeritus professor of higher education at University College London.

Barnett's first publication, The Idea of Higher Education (1990), attempted to found a new conception of higher education by drawing upon the Critical Theory of Jurgen Habermas. Barnett's interests in Critical Theory were reflected in a more practical manner in his Higher Education: A Critical Business (1997). In Realizing the University in an Age of Supercomplexity (2000) and A Will to Learn: Being a Student in Age of Uncertainty (2007), Barnett outlined the dispositions and epistemic virtues required by students, teachers and universities to engage with rapidly changing social and pedagogical conditions.

In Being a University (2011) and Imagining the University (2013) Barnett turned to ontological concerns and the importance of the imagination and poetry (under the influence of Martin Heidegger and Roy Bhaskar). Understanding the University (2015) constitutes the final volume of Barnett's 'University trilogy'.

Barnett's most recent books include The Ecological University: A Feasible Utopia (2018) and The Philosophy of Higher Education: A Critical Introduction (2022). The latter reflects upon the history of the philosophy of higher education since the late 1980s and the publication of Barnett's The Idea of Higher Education in 1990. A collection of Barnett's essays, written over a 30 year period, was published as Thinking and Revisiting the University: the selected works of Ronald Barnett (2015).

== Major publications ==
- 2021 - The Philosophy of Higher Education: A Critical Introduction (Routledge) (300pp)
- 2018 - The Ecological University: A Feasible Utopia (Routledge) (220pp)
- 2015 - Understanding the University (Routledge) (210pp)
- 2014 - Thinking and Rethinking the University (Routledge World Library of Educationalists) (280pp)
- 2013 - Imagining the University. (Routledge) (190pp)
- 2011 - Being a University. (Routledge) (190pp)
- 2007 - Will to Learn: Being a Student in an Age of Uncertainty (McGraw-Hill/ Open University Press) (200pp)
- 2003 - Beyond All Reason: Living with Ideology in the University (Open University Press) (220pp)
- 2000 - Realizing the University in an age of supercomplexity (Open University Press)
- 1997- Higher Education: A Critical Business (Open University Press) (200pp)
- 1994 - The Limits of Competence (OU Press) (200pp) (October) (reprinted)
- 1992 - Improving Higher Education: Total Quality Care (OU Press) (240pp) (reprinted)
- 1990 - The Idea of Higher Education (Open University Press) (244pp) (reprinted)
