= Elisionism =

Elisionism is a philosophical standpoint encompassing various social theories. Elisionist theories are diverse; however, they are unified in their adherence to process philosophy as well as their assumption that the social and the individual cannot be separated. The term elisionism was coined by Margaret Archer in 1995 in the book Realist Social Theory: The Morphogenetic Approach. Elisionism is often contrasted with holism, atomism, and emergentism.
