= Sociology of sociology =

Branch of sociology

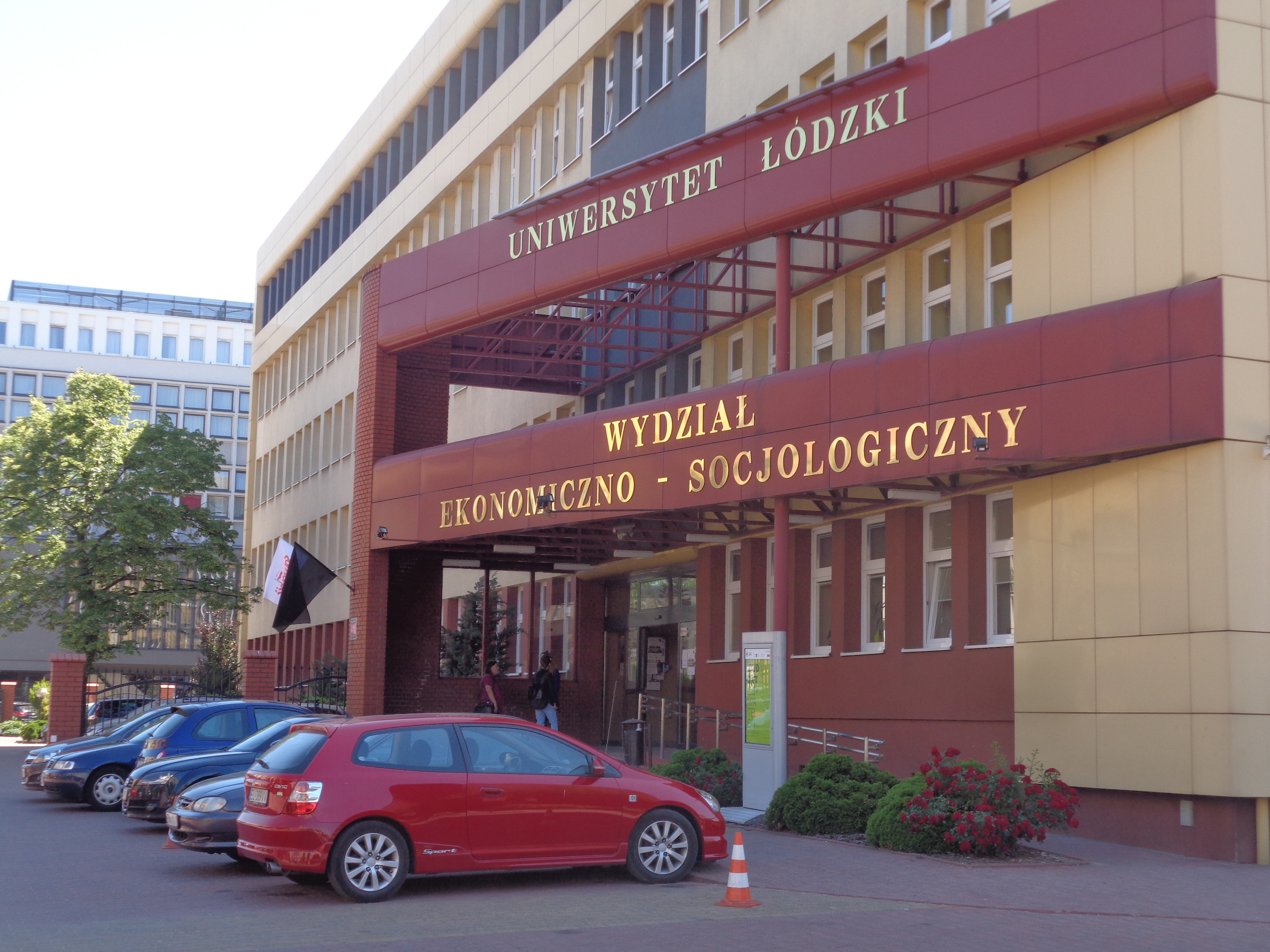
University of Łódź, Poland. Faculty of Economics and Sociology main entrance.

Sociology of sociology or metasociology is an area of sociology that combines social theories with analysis of the effect of socio-historical contexts in sociological intellectual production.

For the French sociologist Pierre Bourdieu, the task of the sociology of sociology is to debrief accepted truths, focusing on the questioning of canons and acting towards new epistemologies.

In his book A History of Sociology in Britain, published 2004, British sociologist Andrew Halsey outlines a sociology of sociology. He suggests a connection between political economic regimes in the 20th century and the development of sociology as an academic discipline.

== See also ==
- Metatheory
- Philosophy of social science
