= Tony Lawson =

British philosopher and economist

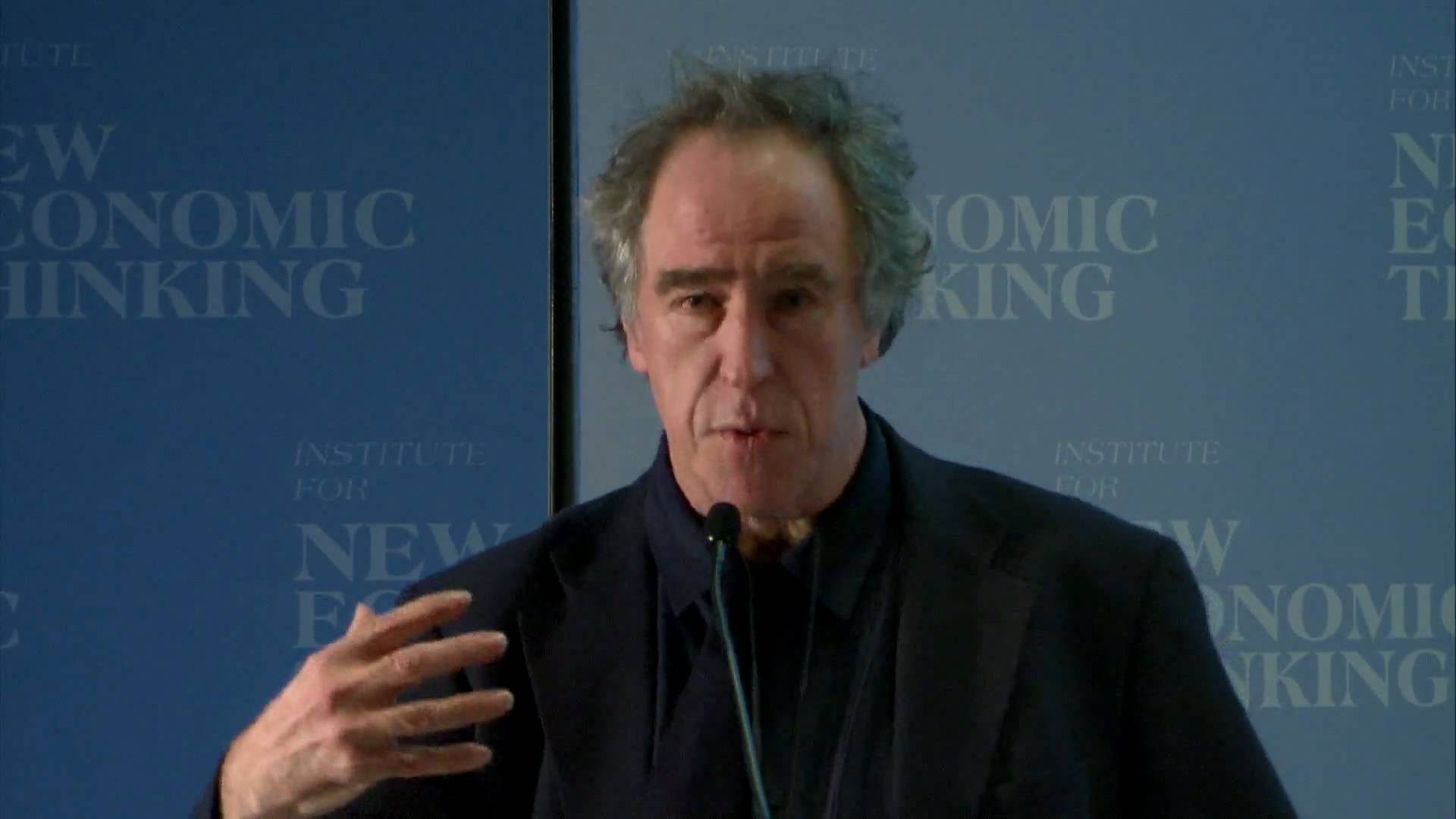
- Lawson in 2010
- Born: Minehead, Somerset, England

Education
- Education: University of Cambridge

Philosophical work
- Era: Contemporary philosophy
- Region: Western philosophy
- School: Critical realism, Cambridge social ontology
- Main interests: Philosophy of economics, ontology, ethics, gender studies
- Notable ideas: Social positioning theory, critical ethical naturalism, contrast explanation, neoclassical economics as a (contradictory) position in social ontology, quantum social theorising with relational depth, irrelevance of mathematical economic modelling
- Website: Homepage

Tony Lawson is a British philosopher and economist. He is professor of economics and philosophy in the Faculty of Economics at the University of Cambridge. He is a co-editor of the Cambridge Journal of Economics, a former director of the University of Cambridge Centre for Gender Studies, and co-founder of the Cambridge Realist Workshop and the Cambridge Social Ontology Group. Lawson is noted for his contributions to heterodox economics and to philosophical issues in social theorising, most especially to social ontology.

== Contributions ==
=== Economics ===
Lawson's early contributions were on philosophical topics such as uncertainty, knowledge and prediction as well as on substantive analyses of the labour process and the industrial decline of the United Kingdom. Lawson's further work has focussed on achieving greater relevance in social theorising, especially economics. This has involved developing an ontologically informed critique of mainstream economics and elaborating methods more relevant to social analysis. Perhaps most importantly, Lawson has introduced ontological reflection into all aspects of economic discussion, including methodology, basic theory and history of economic thought. Lawson argues repeatedly that if social science is to be successful then it must fashion methods that are appropriate to its subject matter. He argues that this requires an explicit orientation to social ontology. The reason that mathematical modelling in economics fails to provide insight, he reasons, is simply because such methods are quite inappropriate, given the nature of social material. Lawson develops dialectical methods that he systematises as contrast explanation. More basically Lawson advocates pluralism in method for modern economics.

Lawson has also argued that the notion of a neoclassical economics is not coherent. Thorstein Veblen (who coined the label neoclassical economist) identified neoclassical economists as those who made two mutually incompatible commitments. First, they used methods that implicitly presuppose (often unrecognised) a social reality of a static, non-relational nature. These methods were associated with economists that Veblen deemed to be classical. Second, they partially broke with classical economists in that they simultaneously (and so inconsistently) explicitly embraced a vision wherein social reality is of a processual, relational, nature. So, these economists were interpreted not as straightforwardly classical but, in seeking or wanting to move forward (in a direction Veblen regarded as positive), as neo-classical. Lawson argues that this incompatibility of (ontological) commitments lives on today, albeit largely unnoticed, not least in many (typically ‘heterodox’) economic modellers.

Lawson has also developed a conception of the human individual person that, in contrast to the isolated atom of most of modern economics, always stands within a multitude of social relations. However, in contrast to the posits of postmodern conceptions, in particular of those conceptions that identify as quantum social theories, Lawson’s individual does not reduce to these social relations. Indeed, Lawson’s conception turns out (though not by design) to qualify as a quantum social theory itself, but does so (and unlike competing conceptions) without losing sight of human subjectivity, relational depth, or giving up on explanatory power.

=== Philosophy ===
As a result of his argument that economics should concern itself with ontology, Lawson has developed and defended his own theory of the constitution and nature of social reality. The main philosophical influence for this is the Cambridge Social Ontology Group. An early influence was the work of Roy Bhaskar. Indeed, in his early work, Lawson joined Bhaskar and others in referring to the account of social reality defended as critical realism. Since 1997, however, Lawson has developed his own conception of social ontology, largely in collaboration with the Cambridge Social Ontology Group. The project is known as Cambridge Social Ontology and its central conception is systematised as social positioning theory.

==== Social ontology ====
Lawson's conception of social ontology has been in part derived through transcendental argument. He defines as social anything "whose formation/coming into existence and/or continuing existence necessarily depend at least in part upon human beings and their interactions”. Lawson argues that there is a level of emergent – from human interaction – reality that is reasonably demarcated as social. In general, however, Lawson argues, “we human beings for the most part do not create social reality, but rather, on finding it given to us at each moment, each draw upon it in acting in always situated ways, pursuing our particular situated concerns, in conditions clearly not of our own making, with understandings that are always fallible and extremely partial at best, and in so doing thereby contribute, along with the simultaneous actions of all others, to the continuous reproduction and transformation of social reality in a manner that is mostly unintended and poorly understood”.

The result is a world in which human agency and social structure each presuppose the other though neither is reducible to, or completely explicable in terms of, the other. More specifically, Lawson argues that social reality is everywhere constituted through positioning people and things as components of social totalities, whereupon human actions and uses of positioned objects are guided by rights and obligations associated with the positions. Whole communities can also be so positioned, as in the formation of corporations. The result is a social realm organised by various forms of social structure of which there are different types such as communities, collective practices, norms, social rules, social positions, powers, social relations, and artefacts.

==== Ethics ====
Lawson defends a conception of ethics named critical ethical naturalism in which the goal is a society in which we all flourish in our differences, and the mechanism ever nudging us towards it turns on the fact that the flourishing of any one of us depends on the flourishing of all and at some level we all recognise this.

==== Debates ====
Lawson has engaged in numerous debates with various contributors, many of which are published, including, early on, over the use of econometrics and indeed mathematical economic modelling of any sort as practiced, and later, regarding the value of ontology to social theorising, including to feminist theorising. In addition, Edward Fullbrook’s Ontology and Economics: Tony Lawson and his Critics, contains a series of debates between Lawson and leading heterodox economists. Recently Lawson has debated the relative advantages of competing conceptions of social ontology with several ontologists such as John Searle, Doug Porpora and Colin Wight. Moreover, he has debated the nature of specific social existents, such as money, with Searle and Geoffrey Ingham.

== Bibliography ==
=== Books ===
- Lawson, Tony (2019). The Nature of Social Reality: Issues in Social Ontology. London: Routledge. ISBN 978-0367188931. OCLC 1082243306.
- Lawson, Tony (2015). Essays on the Nature and State of Modern Economics. London: Routledge. ISBN 978-1138851023. OCLC 907773349.
- Lawson, Tony (2003). Reorienting Economics. London: Routledge. ISBN 978-0415253369. OCLC 810086031.
- Lawson, Tony (1997). Economics and Reality. London: Routledge. ISBN 978-1134735105. OCLC 225574891.

=== Selected articles ===
- Lawson, Tony (2022). "Social positioning theory". Cambridge Journal of Economics. 46 (1): 1–39. doi:10.1093/cje/beab040.
- Lawson, Tony (2018). "The Constitution and Nature of Money". Cambridge Journal of Economics. 42 (3): 851–873. doi:10.1093/cje/bey005.
- Lawson, Tony (2016). "Social positioning and the nature of money". Cambridge Journal of Economics. 40 (4): 961–996. doi:10.1093/cje/bew006.
- Lawson, Tony (2016). "Comparing Conceptions of Social Ontology: Emergent Social Entities and/or Institutional Facts?". Journal for the Theory of Social Behaviour. 46 (4): 359–399. doi:10.1111/jtsb.12126.
- Lawson, Tony (2016). "Some Critical Issues in Social Ontology: Reply to John Searle". Journal for the Theory of Social Behaviour. 46 (4): 426–437. doi:10.1111/jtsb.12129.
- Lawson, Tony (2016). "Ontology and Social Relations: Reply to Doug Porpora and to Colin Wight". Journal for the Theory of Social Behaviour. 46 (4): 438–449. doi:10.1111/jtsb.12128.

=== Secondary sources ===
- "Special issue: Cambridge Social Ontology: Clarification, Development and Deployment". Cambridge Journal of Economics. 41 (5). 2017.
- Fullbrook, Edward (2009). Ontology and economics : Tony Lawson and his critics. New York: Routledge. ISBN 978-0415546492. OCLC 227191562.
- "Cambridge social ontology, the philosophical critique of modern economics and social positioning theory: an interview with Tony Lawson, part 1". Journal of Critical Realism. 20:1, 72–97. 2021.
- "Cambridge social ontology, the philosophical critique of modern economics and social positioning theory: an interview with Tony Lawson, part 2". Journal of Critical Realism. 20:2, 201–237. 2021.
