= Philosophy of the Social Sciences (journal) =

- Discipline: Philosophy of social science
- Language: English
- Edited by: Ian C. Jarvie

Publication details
- History: 1971-present
- Publisher: SAGE Publications
- Frequency: Quarterly
- Impact factor: 0.559 (2017)

Standard abbreviations
- ISO 4: Philos. Soc. Sci.

Indexing
- ISSN: 0048-3931
- LCCN: 72623701
- OCLC no.: 470191354

Links
- Journal homepage; Online access; Online archive

Philosophy of the Social Sciences is a peer-reviewed academic journal that covers philosophy of social science. Its editor-in-chief is Ian C. Jarvie (York University). The journal was established in 1971 and is currently published by SAGE Publications.

== Abstracting and indexing ==
Philosophy of the Social Sciences is abstracted and indexed in Scopus and the Social Sciences Citation Index. According to the Journal Citation Reports, the journal has a 2017 impact factor of 0.559, ranking it 40th out of 51 journals in the category "Ethics".

== See also ==
- List of ethics journals
