= Bob Jessop =

British academic (born 1946)

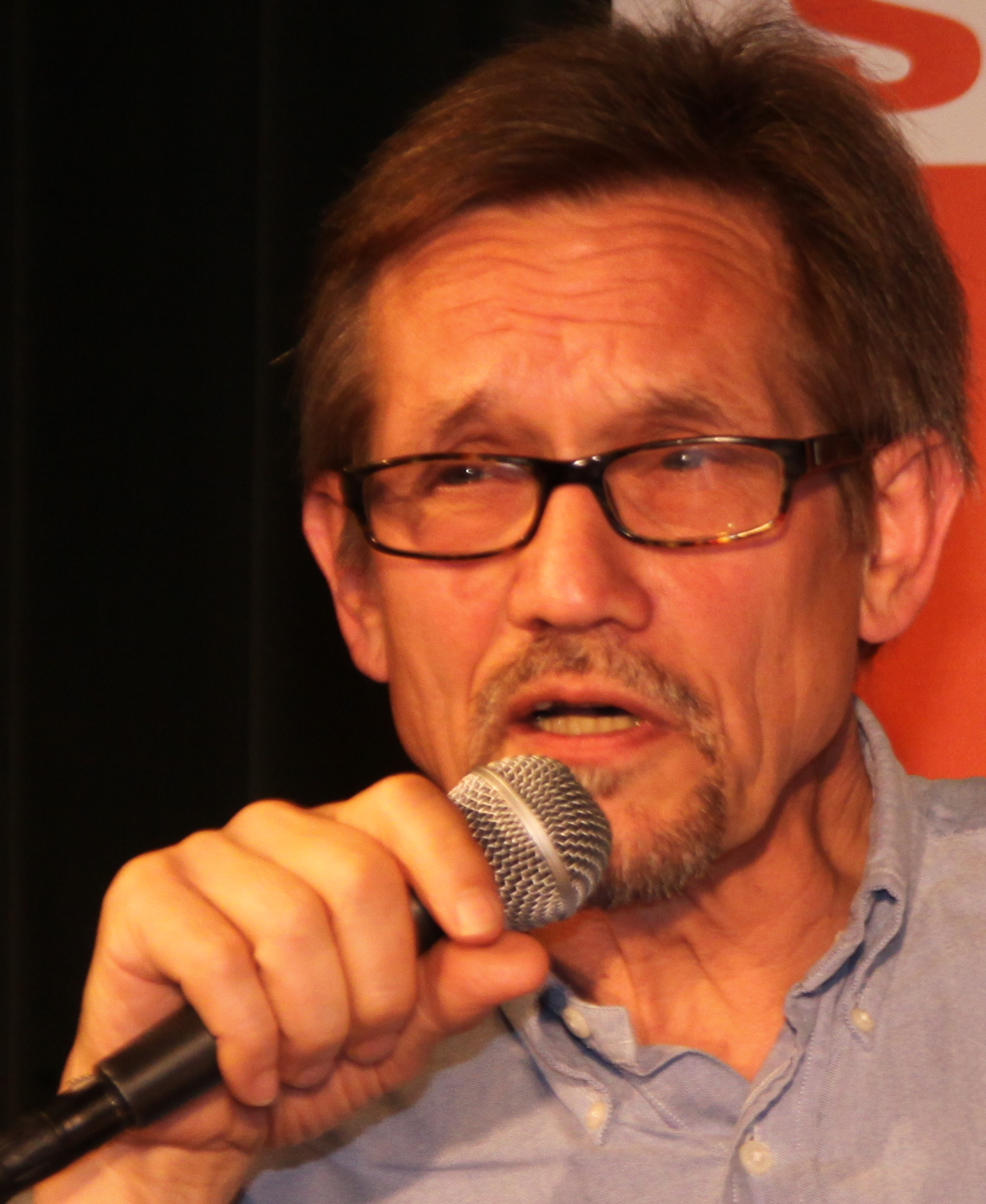
- Bob Jessop (2012)
- Born: Robert Douglas Jessop; March 3, 1946 (age 80)

Academic background
- Education: University of Exeter (BA); University of Cambridge (PhD)
- Thesis: Deference, Traditionalism, and Civility in English Political Culture with Special Reference to Five Constituencies (1973)
- Doctoral advisor: Philip Abrams

Academic work
- Discipline: Sociology
- Institutions: University of East Anglia (1968–1969); Downing College, Cambridge (1970–1975); University of Essex (1975–1990); University of Lancaster (1990–)
- Notable ideas: Structural selectivity Time sovereignty
- Website: http://www.bobjessop.org

Bob Jessop FAcSS (born 3 March 1946) is a British academic who has published extensively on state theory and political economy. He is currently Distinguished Professor of Sociology at the University of Lancaster.

== Biography ==
Jessop graduated with a BA in sociology from the University of Exeter in 1967. He received his PhD from the University of Cambridge in 1973 with a dissertation on conservatism in English political culture, supervised by Philip Abrams.

He taught sociology as a part-time lecturer at the University of East Anglia from 1968 to 1969, and was a research fellow and director of studies in social and political sciences at Downing College, Cambridge from 1970 to 1975. He then joined the University of Essex as a lecturer in government, achieving promotion to senior lecturer in 1988 and reader in 1989. He became a professor of sociology at the University of Lancaster in 1990 and was appointed distinguished professor in 2007.

== Work ==
Jessop's major contribution to state theory is in treating the state not as an entity but as a social relation with differential strategic effects. This means that the state is not something with an essential, fixed property, such as a neutral coordinator of different social interests, an autonomous corporate actor with its own bureaucratic goals and interests, or the "executive committee of the bourgeoisie", as often described by pluralists, elitists/statists, and conventional Marxists, respectively. Rather, what the state is essentially determined by is the nature of the wider social relations in which it is situated, especially the balance of social forces.

The state can thus be understood as follows: First, the state has varied natures, apparatuses, and boundaries according to its historical and geographical developments as well as its specific conjunctures. One of these apparatuses is state projects, which include a mechanism that Jessop calls structural selectivity. He claims that state structures "offer unequal chances to different forces within and outside that state to act for different political purposes". However, there is a strategic limit to this variation, imposed by the given balance of forces at specific time and space. Thus, second, the state has differential effects on various political and economic strategies in a way that privileges some over others, but at the same time, it is the interaction among these strategies that results in such exercise of state power. This approach is called the "strategic-relational approach" and can be considered as a creative extension and development of Marx's concept of capital not as a thing but as a social relation and of Antonio Gramsci's and Nicos Poulantzas's concept of the state as a social relation, something more than narrow political society.

Jessop uses the term "time sovereignty" (or "temporal sovereignty") to stand for a government's right to have at its disposition the time that is required for considered political decision-making. He states that this "time sovereignty" is endangered as governments see themselves pressured to compress their own decision-making cycles so that they can make more timely and appropriate interventions.

== Major works ==
- Traditionalism, Conservatism and British Political Culture, London: George Allen & Unwin, 1974.
- The Capitalist State: Marxist Theories and Methods, Oxford: Blackwell, 1982.
- Nicos Poulantzas: Marxist Theory and Political Strategy, London: Macmillan, 1985.
- Thatcherism: A Tale of Two Nations (with Kevin Bonnett, Simon Bromley, Tom Ling), Cambridge: Polity, 1988.
- State Theory: Putting the Capitalist State in Its Place, Cambridge: Polity, 1990.
- The Future of the Capitalist State, Cambridge: Polity, 2002.
- Beyond the Regulation Approach: Putting Capitalist Economies in their Place (with Ngai-Ling Sum), Cheltenham: Edward Elgar 2006. Winner of the Gunnar Myrdal Prize awarded given by the European Association for Evolutionary Political Economy for the best book published in 2006 broadly in line with its aims and objectives.
- State Power: A Strategic-Relational Approach, Cambridge: Polity, 2007.
- Towards a Cultural Political Economy: Putting Culture in its Place in Political Economy (with Ngai-Ling Sum), Cheltenham: Edward Elgar, 2014.
- The State: Past, Present, Future, Cambridge: Polity, 2016.
- Putting Civil Society in Its Place: Governance, Metagovernance and Subjectivity, Bristol: Policy Press, 2020.

== See also ==
- Critical realism
