= Norman Dennis =

British sociologist (1929 –2010)

- Born: 16 August 1929; Sunderland, Durham
- Died: 13 November 2010 (aged 81); Sunderland, Tyne and Wear
- Education: Bede Collegiate Boys' School; London School of Economics
- Occupation: Sociologist
- Spouse: Audrey Robson (1954–2010)
- Children: John Dennis; Julia Hodkinson

Norman Dennis (16 August 1929 – 13 November 2010) was a British sociologist.

== Early life and education ==
Born one of four sons to a tram driver, Norman Dennis was educated at Bede Collegiate Boys' School. He was offered a place at Corpus Christi College, Oxford, but declined it in favour of the London School of Economics, where he achieved a first-class honours degree in economics.

== Academic career ==
Dennis held academic posts at the Universities of Leeds, Bristol and Birmingham before finally holding a long-term post as Lecturer, later Reader, in Social Studies at Newcastle University, where he worked for 35 years.

He was a lifelong Labour supporter and was a Labour councillor in Millfield, Sunderland, in the early 1970s. He was driven to do this by his disgust at the planned slum clearances in Sunderland at the time, which he opposed strongly. It was this that also inspired him to write about economic pressures and how they shape society.

The Daily Telegraph news blogger Ed West described Dennis as "a key analyst of late 20th-century British society whose influence, I suspect, will stretch long into the 21st".

== Death ==
Dennis died of leukaemia on 13 November 2010 in Sunderland, at the age of 81.

== Bibliography ==
- Coal Is Our Life - An Analysis of a Yorkshire Mining Community (1956)
- People and Planning (Society Today & Tomorrow) (1970)
- Public Participation and Planner's Blight (1972)
- English Ethical Socialism: Thomas More to R.H. Tawney (with A.H. Halsey) (1988)
- Families Without Fatherhood (1992)
- Rising Crime and the Dismembered Family (1993)
- The Invention of Permanent Poverty (1997)
- Racist Murder and Pressure Group Politics (2000)
- Cultures and Crimes: Policing in Four Nations (2005)
