= Andrew Sayer =

(R.) Andrew Sayer (born 1949) is Emeritus Professor of Social Theory and Political Economy at Lancaster University, UK. He is known for significant contributions to methodology and theory in the social sciences.

== Education ==
Andrew Sayer studied a BA (University of London, external) in Geography at Cambridgeshire College of Arts and Technology (now Anglia Ruskin University) in the late 1960s, and then did an MA and D.Phil. in Urban and Regional Studies at Sussex University in the early 1970s. He was lecturer in the School of Social Sciences at Sussex until he moved to a lectureship at Lancaster University in 1993. Although affiliated with sociology, he has affinities with other disciplines, particularly philosophy, human geography, urban and regional studies and political economy, and defines himself as 'post-disciplinary'.

== Scholarship ==
Sayer's early work was on radical understandings of uneven development in Western societies, and urban and regional change. His book with Kevin Morgan, Microcircuits of Capital (1988), was a result. He reworked aspects of political economy and Marxist thought (Radical Political Economy: A Critique, 1995). In the late 1990s he incorporated a cultural understanding of political-economic change, building on Pierre Bourdieu's work on economic and cultural capital. The Moral Significance of Class (2005) analyses the ethical aspects of people's experience of class inequalities: how people value one another and themselves. Since then most of his work has been on moral economy and its links to political economy, and on the ethical dimension of everyday life. These interests are reflected in his Why Things Matter to People: Social Science, Values and Ethical Life (2011), and his Why we can't afford the rich (2014).

He is perhaps best known for his effort to recast the philosophy and methodology of the social sciences, developing critical realism as a philosophy of and for the social sciences (Method in Social Science, 1984, and Realism and Social Science, 2000). Critical realism argues for "theoretically informed concrete research". Method in Social Science has been cited over 4230 times as of Feb. 2016. Debates about Sayer's approach have been extensive, particularly regarding his view that empirical modelling techniques in the social sciences cannot show real causal relationships, and his dissatisfaction with social constructionism and postmodernism.

== Moral economy ==
The concept of moral economy is central to many aspects of Sayer’s work. He uses it with several different senses:

First, he argues that our economies are moral economies, in the sense that when people take economic action, that action is not only driven by self-interested calculation as mainstream economics suggests, but also affected by the actor’s normative commitments and social relationships. This argument builds on E.P. Thompson’s well-known work on early modern food riots in England, in which he argued that these disturbances were provoked by breaches of customary expectations that food should be affordable for the poor. As Sayer puts it, “The moral economy embodies norms and sentiments regarding the responsibilities and rights of individuals and institutions with respect to others”.

Second, he thinks of moral economy as an approach to studying this kind of economy (by analogy with political economy). It “studies the moral norms and sentiments that structure and influence economic practices, both formal and informal, and the way in which these are reinforced, compromised or overridden by economic pressures”. He tends, however, to reject treatments of normativity as self-interested responses to systems of sanctions and instead sees it as driven at least in part by our ethical commitments to caring for the flourishing of others.

Third, he thinks of moral economy as itself an evaluative approach to the economy. Because social scientists themselves are also ethical beings, “in paying close attention to how economic arrangements affect well-being, [we] can hardly avoid normative implications”. He argues that our evaluative stances are influenced by our cultural context, but also by transcultural understandings of what human beings need in order to flourish or indeed what causes them to suffer. He is particularly concerned by the tendency for critical social scientists to suppress the ethical evaluative basis of their arguments: “Critical social science, needs to acknowledge its often hidden or repressed premise – that its evaluations of practices imply a conception of human flourishing”.

Having formulated these variants of the concept in a series of papers, Sayer went on to apply them in a number of the books discussed elsewhere in this article, notably The Moral Significance of Class (2005), Why Things Matter to People (2011), and Why We Can't Afford the Rich (2014).

== Awards ==
- Honorary Doctorate, Lund University, 2009
- Peter Townsend Prize, British Academy, 2015 (for Why we can't afford the rich)

== Main publications ==
- Sayer, A. 2014. Why We Can't Afford the Rich. Polity Press.
- Sayer, A. 2011. Why Things Matter to People: Social Science, Values and Ethical Life. Cambridge University Press.
- Sayer, A. 2011. 'Habitus, work and contributive justice', Sociology, 45(1): 7-21.
- Sayer, A. 2009. 'Who's afraid of critical social science?', Current Sociology. 57(6): 767-786
- Sayer, A. 2005. The Moral Significance of Class. Cambridge: Cambridge University Press, published in Chinese 2008
- Sayer, A. 2005. 'Class, worth and recognition' Sociology, 39 (5) 947-963 reprinted in Lovell, T. 2007 Misrecognition, Social Inequality and Social Justice, Routledge, pp. 88–102.
- Sayer, A. 2000. Realism and social science. London: Sage.
- Ray, L. and Sayer, A. (eds.). 1999. Culture and Economy After the Cultural Turn. London: Sage.
- Sayer, A. 1995. Radical Political Economy: Critique and Reformulation. Oxford: Blackwell.
- Sayer, A. and Walker, R.A. 1992. The new social economy. Oxford: Blackwell.
- Morgan, K. and Sayer, A. 1988. Microcircuits of capital. Cambridge: Polity.
- Sayer, A. 1984/1992. Method in Social Science: a realist approach. Hutchinson/Routledge.
- Sayer, A. 1982. ‘Explanation in economic geography’ Progress in Human Geography 6: 68-88
- Sayer, A. 1981. ‘Abstraction: a realist interpretation’ Radical Philosophy 28: 6-15
