= Center for the Study of Religion and Society =

Research center of the University of Notre Dame

Coordinates: 41°41′44.8″N 86°14′16.0″W

The Center for the Study of Religion and Society (CSRS) is a research center at the University of Notre Dame in the United States that is dedicated to advancing social scientific understanding of religion in society through scholarly research, training, and publications. The center brings a variety of faculty, students, and other researchers together into a community of scholars engaged in empirical investigations, intellectual interchange and teaching crucial for advancing the sociological study of religion. Activities facilitated by CSRS include major data collection projects, seminars, colloquia, lectures, conferences, grant writing, and the building of an infrastructure for survey, interviews-based, and participant-observation social research. The center combines an emphasis on the insight and richness of cultural analysis with the strength of large-scale survey research.

Christian Smith of the University of Notre Dame is the director of CSRS and the principal investigator on a number of the center's current research projects.
