= Structure and agency =

Debate in social sciences

In the social sciences, there is a standing debate over the primacy of structure or agency in shaping human behaviour. Structure is the recurrent patterned arrangements which influence or limit the choices and opportunities available. Agency is the capacity of individuals to act independently and to make their own free choices. The structure versus agency debate may be understood as an issue of socialization against autonomy in determining whether an individual acts as a free agent or in a manner dictated by social structure.

== Overview of Debate ==
The debate over the primacy of structure or of agency relates to an issue at the heart of both classical and contemporary sociological theory: the question of social ontology: "What is the social world made of?" "What is a cause of the social world, and what is an effect?" "Do social structures determine an individual's behaviour or does human agency create societal normalcy?"

Structural functionalists such as Émile Durkheim see structure and hierarchy as essential in establishing the very existence of society. Theorists such as Karl Marx, by contrast, emphasize that the social structure can act to the detriment of the majority of individuals in a society. In both these instances, "structure" may refer to something both material (or "economic") and cultural (i.e. related to norms, customs, traditions and ideologies).

Some theorists put forward that what we know as our social existence is largely determined by the overall structure of society. The perceived agency of individuals can also mostly be explained by the operation of this structure. Theoretical systems aligned with this view include:

- structuralism – understanding human culture by the structure of their interrelations.
- functionalism – looking at societal norms as functions for the society as a whole.
- base and superstructure – a Marxist theory that examined an economic base and the social structures around it.
- holism – looking at everything together with the notion that "the whole is greater than the sum of its parts".

On the other hand, other theorists stress the capacity of individual "agents" or "persons" to construct and reconstruct their own worlds. In this sense, the individual can be viewed as more influential than the system. Theoretical systems aligned with this view include:

- methodological individualism – explaining social situations with the decisions of the individuals involved.
- social phenomenology – understanding sociology from an intersubjective standpoint.
- interactionism – looking at social processes by first understanding the social interaction subjectively.
- ethnomethodology – examining how an individual person changes or creates social orders.

Lastly, a third option, taken by many modern social theorists, attempts to find a point of balance between the two previous positions. They see structure and agency as complementary forces – structure influences human behaviour, and humans are capable of changing the social structures they inhabit. Structuration issue one prominent example of this view.

The first approach (emphasizing the importance of societal structure) dominated in classical sociology. Theorists saw unique aspects of the social world that could not be explained simply by the sum of the individuals present. Durkheim strongly believed that the collective had emergent properties of its own and saw the need for a science which would deal with this emergence. The second approach (methodological individualism, etc.), however, also has a well-established position in social science. Many theorists still follow this course (economists, for example, tend to disregard any kind of holism).

The central debate, therefore, pits theorists committed to the notions of methodological holism against those committed to methodological individualism. The first notion, methodological holism, is the idea that actors are socialized and embedded into social structures and institutions that constrain, or enable, and generally shape the individuals' dispositions towards, and capacities for, action, and that this social structure should be taken as primary and most significant. The second notion, methodological individualism, is the idea that actors are the central theoretical and ontological elements in social systems, and social structure is an epiphenomenon, a result and consequence of the actions and activities of interacting individuals.

== Major theorists ==
=== Georg Simmel ===
Georg Simmel (1858–1918) was one of the first generation of German nonpositivist sociologists. His studies pioneered the concepts of social structure and agency. His most famous works today include The Metropolis and Mental Life and The Philosophy of Money.

=== Norbert Elias ===
Norbert Elias (1897–1990) was a German sociologist whose work focused on the relationship between power, behaviour, emotion, and knowledge over time. He significantly shaped what is called process sociology or figurational sociology.

=== Talcott Parsons ===
Talcott Parsons (1902–1979) was an American sociologist and the main theorist of action theory (misleadingly called "structural functionalism") in sociology from the 1930s in the United States. His works analyze social structure but in terms of voluntary action and through patterns of normative institutionalization by codifying its theoretical gestalt into a system-theoretical framework based on the idea of living systems and cybernetic hierarchy. For Parsons there is no structure–agency problem. It is a pseudo-problem. His development of Max Weber's means-end action structure is summarized in Instrumental and value-rational action

=== Pierre Bourdieu ===
Pierre Bourdieu (1930–2002) was a French theorist who presented his theory of practice on the dichotomic understanding of the relation between agency and structure in a great number of publications, beginning with An Outline of the Theory of Practice in 1972, where he presented the concept of habitus. His book Distinction: A Social Critique of the Judgement of Taste (1979), was named as one of the 20th century's 10 most important works of sociology by the International Sociological Association.

The key concepts in Bourdieu's work are habitus, field, and capital. The agent is socialized in a "field", an evolving set of roles and relationships in a social domain, where various forms of "capital" such as prestige or financial resources are at stake. As the agent accommodates to their roles and relationships in the context of their position in the field, they internalize relationships and expectations for operating in that domain. These internalized relationships and habitual expectations and relationships form, over time, the habitus.

Bourdieu's work attempts to reconcile structure and agency, as external structures are internalized into the habitus while the actions of the agent externalize interactions between actors into the social relationships in the field. Bourdieu's theory, therefore, is a dialectic between "externalizing the internal", and "internalizing the external".

=== Berger and Luckmann ===
Peter L. Berger and Thomas Luckmann in their Social Construction of Reality (1966) saw the relationship between structure and agency as dialectical. Society forms the individuals who create society – forming a continuous loop.

=== James Coleman ===
The sociologist James Samuel Coleman (1926–1995) famously diagramed the link between macrosociological phenomena and individual behaviour in what is commonly referred to as Coleman's Boat. A macro-level phenomenon is described as instigating particular actions by individuals, which results in a subsequent macro-level phenomenon. In this way, individual action is taken in reference to a macro-sociological structure, and that action (by many individuals) results in change to that macro-structure.

=== Anthony Giddens ===
Contemporary sociology has generally aimed toward a reconciliation of structure and agency as concepts. Anthony Giddens has developed structuration theory in such works as The Constitution of Society (1984). He presents a developed attempt to move beyond the dualism of structure and agency and argues for the "duality of structure" – where social structure is both the medium and the outcome of social action, and agents and structures as mutually constitutive entities with "equal ontological status". For Giddens, an agent's common interaction with structure, as a system of norms, is described as structuration. The term reflexivity is used to refer to the ability of an agent to consciously alter his or her place in the social structure; thus globalization and the emergence of the 'post-traditional' society might be said to allow for "greater social reflexivity". Social and political sciences are therefore important because social knowledge, as self-knowledge, is potentially emancipatory.

=== Klaus Hurrelmann ===
Klaus Hurrelmann's (1944–present) access to research on structure and agency is characterized by socialization theory. Central to the theory is the life-long interaction between the individual and his/her longing for freedom and autonomy, and society with its pressure of order and structure. As he states in his "Model of Productive Processing of Reality (PPR)", personality "does not form independently from society any of its functions or dimensions but is continuously being shaped, in a concrete, historically conveyed life world, throughout the entire space of the life span". The PPR model places the human subject in a social and ecological context that must be absorbed and processed subjectively. The human being as an autonomous subject has the lifelong task to harmonize the processes of social integration and personal individualization. This task is mastered in specific steps that are typical for the respective age and the achieved developmental stage ("developmental tasks").

=== Roberto Unger ===
The social theorist and legal philosopher Roberto Mangabeira Unger (1947–present) developed the thesis of negative capability to address this problem of agency in relation to structure. In his work on false necessity – or anti-necessitarian social theory – Unger recognizes the constraints of structure and its molding influence upon the individual, but at the same time finds the individual able to resist, deny, and transcend their context. The varieties of this resistance are negative capability. Unlike other theories of structure and agency, negative capability does not reduce the individual to a simple actor possessing only the dual capacity of compliance or rebellion, but rather sees him or her as able to partake in a variety of activities of self empowerment.

== Recent developments ==
A recent development in the debate is the critical realist structure/agency perspective embodied in Roy Bhaskar's transformational model of social action (TMSA) which he later expanded into his concept of four-planar social being. A major difference between Giddens' structuration theory and the TMSA is that the TMSA includes a temporal element (time). The TMSA has been further advocated and applied in other social science fields by additional authors, for example in economics by Tony Lawson and in sociology by Margaret Archer. In 2005, the Journal of Management Studies debated the merits of critical realism.

Kenneth Wilkinson in the Community in Rural America took an interactional/field theoretical perspective focusing on the role of community agency in contributing to the emergence of community.

With critical psychology as a framework, the Danish psychologist Ole Dreier proposes in his book Psychotherapy in Everyday Life that we may best conceptualize persons as participants in social practices (that constitute social structures) who can either reproduce or change these social practices. This indicates that neither participants, nor social practices can be understood when looked at in isolation (in fact, this undermines the very idea of trying to do so), since practice and structure is co-created by participants and since the participants can only be called so, if they participate in a social practice.

The structure/agency debate continues to evolve, with contributions such as Nicos Mouzelis's Sociological Theory: What Went Wrong? and Margaret Archer's Realist Social Theory: The Morphogenetic Approach continuing to push the ongoing development of structure/agency theory. Work in information systems by Mutch (2010) has emphasized Archer's Realist Social Theory as well as Robert Archer's (2018) application in the field of education policy and organization theory. In entrepreneurship a discussion between Sarason et al. and Mole & Mole (2010) used Archer's theory to critique structuration by arguing that starting a new business organization needs to be understood in the context of social structure and agency. However, this depends upon one's view of structure, which differs between Giddens and Archer. Hence if strata in social reality have different ontologies, then they must be viewed as a dualism. Moreover, agents have causal power, and ultimate concerns which they try to fallibly put into practice. Mole and Mole propose entrepreneurship as the study of the interplay between the structures of a society and the agents within it.

An alternative evolution of the debate, proposed by Casanova (2026), aims to question the terms of the traditional debate, and rejects the view that agents and structures constitute an ontological feature of social reality, arguing that this antinomy "is a historically specific social form produced by and through capitalist relations of objectification", and that "an adequate sociological account of the antinomy requires understanding it not as the basis of explanation, but as what must itself be theoretically constituted and historically explained."

== Purported differences in approach between European and American thinkers ==
While the structure–agency debate has been a central issue in social theory, and recent theoretical reconciliation attempts have been made, structure–agency theory has tended to develop more in European countries by European theorists, while social theorists from the United States have tended to focus instead on the issue of integration between macrosociological and microsociological perspectives. George Ritzer examines these issues (and surveys the structure agency debate) in greater detail in his book Modern Sociological Theory (2000).

== See also ==
- Actor–network theory – Theory within social science
- Base and superstructure – Concepts in Marxist theory
- Free will – Ability to make choices voluntarily
- Great man theory – Approach to the study of history
- Nature versus nurture – Long-standing debate in biology and society
- Principal–agent problem – Conflict of interest when one person acts on another's behalf
- Social ontology – Branch of philosophy
- Social philosophy – Ethical analysis of social phenomena
