= Critical Policy Studies =

- Discipline: Public policy, social policy, political theory
- Language: English
- Edited by: Kathrin Braun, Jennifer Dodge, Dieter Plehwe

Publication details
- Former name(s): Critical Policy Analysis
- History: 2006-present
- Publisher: Routledge
- Frequency: Quarterly
- Impact factor: 1.868 (2019)

Standard abbreviations
- ISO 4: Crit. Policy Stud.

Indexing
- ISSN: 1946-0171 (print); 1946-018X (web)

Links
- Journal homepage; Online access; Online archive

Critical Policy Studies is a quarterly peer-reviewed academic journal that relates political theory to the fields of public and social policy. According to the Journal Citation Reports, the journal had a 2019 impact factor of 1.868.

== Abstracting and indexing ==
The journal is abstracted and indexed in the following databases:

- EBSCO databases
- Emerging Sources Citation Index
- Scopus
