= Margaret Archer =

English sociologist (1943–2023)

Margaret Archer FAcSS MAE
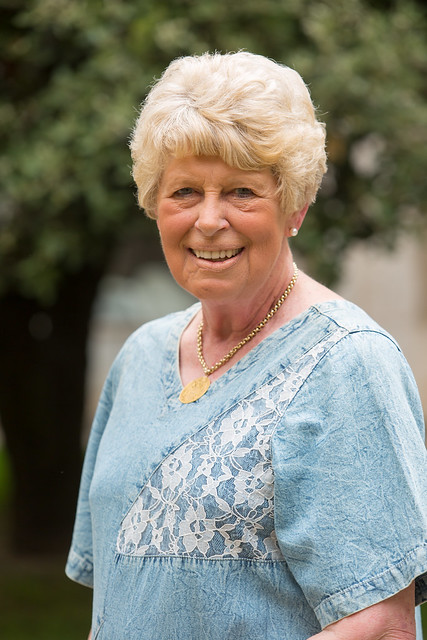
- Archer in 2019
- Born: Margaret Scotford Archer; 20 January 1943; Grenoside, England
- Died: 21 May 2023 (aged 80)
- Other name: Margaret Scotford Archer

Academic background
- Education: London School of Economics
- Thesis: The Educational Aspirations of English Working Class Parents (1967)
- Doctoral advisor: David Glass
- Influences: Roy Bhaskar; Lord Giddens

Academic work
- Discipline: Sociology
- Sub-discipline: Social theory; sociology of education
- School or tradition: Critical realism
- Institutions: University of Reading; University of Warwick
- Main interests: Structure and agency
- Notable works: Culture and Agency (1988); Realist Social Theory (1995); Being Human (2000)
- Notable ideas: Elisionism

Margaret Scotford Archer (20 January 1943 – 21 May 2023) was a British sociologist, who spent most of her academic career at the University of Warwick where she was for many years Professor of Sociology. She was also a professor at l'Ecole Polytechnique Fédérale de Lausanne, Switzerland. She is best known for coining the term elisionism in her 1995 book Realist Social Theory: The Morphogenetic Approach. On 14 April 2014, Archer was named by Pope Francis to succeed former Harvard law professor and US Ambassador to the Holy See Mary Ann Glendon as President of the Pontifical Academy of Social Sciences, and served in this position until her retirement on 27 March 2019.

== Life ==
Archer studied at the University of London, graduating BSc in 1964 and PhD in 1967 with a thesis on The Educational Aspirations of English Working Class Parents. She was a lecturer at the University of Reading from 1966 to 1973.

Archer was one of the most influential theorists in the critical realist tradition. At the 12th World Congress of Sociology, she was elected as the first female President and the 11th president of the International Sociological Association (1986–1990), was a founding member of both the Pontifical Academy of Social Sciences and the Academy of Learned Societies in the Social Sciences. She was a trustee of the Centre for Critical Realism.

Archer supervised a number of PhD students, some of whom went on to contribute towards the substantive development of critical realism in the social sciences, including Robert Archer, author of Education Policy and Realist Social Theory, Sean Creaven, author of Marxism and Realism, and Justin Cruickshank, author of Realism and Sociology.

On 3 November 2020, she received the international prize entitled in honour of don Oreste Benzi, which has been given in Bologna by hand of the patriarch Francesco Moraglia. Her praiseworthy work of mercy was the creation of a female structure for the recovery of poor people.

Archer died on 21 May 2023, at the age of 80.

== Analytical dualism ==
Archer argues that much social theory suffers from the generic defect of conflation where, due to a reluctance or inability to theorize emergent relationships between social phenomena, causal autonomy is denied to one side of the relation. This can take the form of autonomy being denied to agency with causal efficacy only granted to structure (downwards conflation). Alternatively it can take the form of autonomy being denied to structure with causal efficacy only granted to agency (upwards conflation). Finally it may take the form of central conflation where structure and agency are seen as being co-constitutive i.e. structure is reproduced through agency which is simultaneously constrained and enabled by structure. The most prominent example of central conflation is the structuration theory of Anthony Giddens. While not objecting to this approach on philosophical grounds, Archer does object to it on analytical grounds: by conflating structure and agency into unspecified movements of co-constitution, central conflationary approaches preclude the possibility of sociological exploration of the relative influence of each aspect.

In contradistinction Archer offers the approach of analytical dualism. While recognizing the interdependence of structure and agency (i.e. without people there would be no structures) she argues that they operate on different timescales. At any particular moment, antecedently existing structures constrain and enable agents, whose interactions produce intended and unintended consequences, which leads to structural elaboration and the reproduction or transformation of the initial structure. The resulting structure then provides a similar context of action for future agents. Likewise the initial antecedently existing structure was itself the outcome of structural elaboration resulting from the action of prior agents. So while structure and agency are interdependent, Archer argues that it is possible to unpick them analytically. By isolating structural and/or cultural factors which provide a context of action for agents, it is possible to investigate how those factors shape the subsequent interactions of agents and how those interactions in turn reproduce or transform the initial context. Archer calls this a morphogenetic sequence. Social processes are constituted through an endless array of such sequences but, as a consequence of their temporal ordering, it is possible to disengage any such sequence in order to investigate its internal causal dynamics. Through doing so, argues Archer, it is possible to give empirical accounts of how structural and agential phenomena interlink over time rather than merely stating their theoretical interdependence.

Archer discussed morphogenetic social theory, structure agency and culture, and her later work on the morphogenic society in a useful interview in the Journal of Critical Realism.

== Controversy ==
In an interview with Bloomberg, Archer discussed the attendance of US presidential candidate Bernie Sanders at a conference of the Pontifical Academy of Social Sciences that she had organized. Archer accused Sanders of a "monumental discourtesy", claiming he sought to politicize his attendance after having lobbied for an invitation to the conference, failing to notify her office. Marcelo Sánchez Sorondo, the Chancellor of the academy, and senior to Archer, took issue with Archer's version of events. After repeatedly refusing to tell a Bloomberg reporter which party had initiated contact, Sánchez Sorondo insisted that proper protocol had been followed in issuing the invitation: "This is not true and she knows it. I invited him with her consensus." The invitation in question bore his signature as well as Archer's name (but not her signature) and stated that Sánchez Sorondo was inviting Sanders "on behalf of" Archer.

== Bibliography ==
- M. Archer, M. Vaughan M (1971) "Social Conflict and Educational Change in England and France: 1789–1848", Cambridge University Press
- M. Archer (1984) "Social Origins of Educational Systems", London: Sage
- M. Archer (1988) Culture and Agency: The Place of Culture in Social Theory, Cambridge University Press, Cambridge.
- M. Archer (1995) Realist Social Theory: The Morphogenetic Approach, Cambridge University Press, Cambridge.
- M. Archer, R. Bhaskar, A. Collier, T. Lawson and A. Norrie (eds) (1998) Critical Realism: Essential Readings, Routledge, London.
- M. Archer (2000) Being Human: The Problem of Agency, Cambridge University Press, Cambridge.
- M. Archer and J. Tritter (eds) (2000) Rational Choice Theory: Resisting Colonisation, Routledge, London.
- M. Archer (2003) Structure, Agency and the Internal Conversation, Cambridge University Press, Cambridge.
- M. Archer, A. Collier and D. Porpora (eds) (2004) Transcendence: Critical Realism and God, Routledge, London.
- M. Archer (2007) Making Our Way Through the World, Cambridge University Press, Cambridge.
- M. Archer (2012) The Reflexive Imperative in Late Modernity, Cambridge University Press, Cambridge

Catholic Church titles
Preceded by Mary Ann Glendon	President of the Pontifical Academy of Social Sciences; 2014–2019	Succeeded by Stefano Zamagni
Professional and academic associations
Preceded by Fernando Henrique Cardoso	President of the International Sociological Association; 1986–1990	Succeeded by T. K. Oommen
