= Competition & Change =

- Discipline: Political economy
- Language: English
- Edited by: Hulya Dagdeviren, Leo McCann

Publication details
- History: 1995-present
- Publisher: SAGE Publications
- Frequency: 5/year
- Impact factor: 3.9 (2022)

Standard abbreviations
- ISO 4: Compet. Change

Indexing
- CODEN: COCHFM
- ISSN: 1024-5294 (print); 1477-2221 (web)
- LCCN: sn96017162
- OCLC no.: 450990081

Links
- Journal homepage; Online access; Online archive

Competition & Change is a peer-reviewed academic journal that covers the fields of political economy, globalization, financialization, global value chains and Critical Management Studies. The editors-in-chief are Hulya Dagdeviren (University of Hertfordshire) and Leo McCann (University of Manchester). In 1995, the journal was released and established in partnership with Maney Publishing. They switched to SAGE Publications in 2015. The journal is abstracted and indexed in Scopus.
