= Andrew Collier (philosopher) =

British philosopher (1944–2014)

Andrew Collier (1944 – 2014) was Professor of Philosophy at the University of Southampton. He is known for his work on objectivity in the social sciences.

== Biography ==
Born in 1944 in Enfield, London, Collier studied at Bedford College, London and completed his M.Phil. on Sartre at the University College London in 1971. He taught philosophy at the University of Warwick, University of Sussex, and the Bangor University, before taking up a post at the University of Southampton in 1988.

A festschrift was published in Collier's honor, edited by Margaret Archer and William Outhwaite, entitled Defending Objectivity (2007).

Collier lived with cancer for more than a decade and died on 3 July 2014.

== Publications ==
- R. D. Laing: The Philosophy and Politics of Psychotherapy (1971)
- Scientific Realism and Socialist Thought (1988)
- Socialist Reasoning: An Enquiry into the Political Philosophy of Scientific Socialism (1990)
- Critical Realism: An Introduction to Roy Bhaskar’s Philosophy (1994)
- Being and Worth (1999)
- Christianity and Marxism: A Philosophical Contribution to their Reconciliation (2001)
- On Christian Belief: A Defence of a Cognitive Conception of Religious Belief in a Christian Context (2003)
- In Defence of Objectivity (2003)
- Transcendence: Critical Realism and God (with Margaret Archer and Doug Porpora, 2004)
- Marx (2004)
