= Roy Bhaskar =

English philosopher (1944–2014)

- Born: Ram Roy Bhaskar; 15 May 1944; Teddington, England
- Died: 19 November 2014 (aged 70); Leeds, England

Education
- Education: Balliol College, Oxford; Nuffield College, Oxford
- Doctoral advisor: Rom Harré

Philosophical work
- Era: Contemporary philosophy
- Region: Western philosophy
- School: Critical realism (philosophy of the social sciences)
- Institutions: University of Edinburgh
- Main interests: Epistemology; social ontology; philosophy of social science
- Notable ideas: Critical naturalism; Transcendental realism

Ram Roy Bhaskar (/bəˈskɑːr/; 15 May 1944 – 19 November 2014) was an English philosopher of science who is best known as the initiator of the philosophical movement of critical realism (CR). Bhaskar argued that the task of science is "the production of the knowledge of those enduring and continually active mechanisms of nature that produce the phenomena of the world", rather than the discovery of quantitative laws, and that experimental science makes sense only if such mechanisms exist and operate outside the lab as well as inside it.

Roy Bhaskar is certainly the most prominent advocate for "critical realism," but he did not initiate either the term or the concept. The term was used earlier by Donald Campbell (1974/1988, p. 432), and the concept of combining ontological realism and epistemological constructivism goes back at least to Herbert Blumer (1969). Bhaskar went on to apply that realism about mechanisms and causal powers to the philosophy of social science, and he also elaborated a series of arguments to support the critical role of philosophy and the human sciences. According to Bhaskar, it is possible and desirable for the study of society to be scientific.

Bhaskar was a World Scholar at the Institute of Education, University College London. In 2003–2004, he was a Fellow at the Swedish Collegium for Advanced Study in Uppsala, Sweden.

== Background ==
Bhaskar was born on 15 May 1944 in Teddington, London, the first of two sons. His Indian father and English mother were Theosophists. Bhaskar said his childhood was unhappy, with his father having high expectations of him.

In 1963, Bhaskar attended Balliol College, Oxford, on a scholarship to read philosophy, politics and economics. The scholarship freed him from his father's influence over his chosen academic path. Having graduated with first-class honours in 1966, he began work on a PhD thesis about the relevance of economic theory for under-developed countries. His DPhil changed course and was written at Nuffield College, Oxford, where Rom Harré became his supervisor, on the philosophy of social science and then the philosophy of science. His thesis was failed twice, which he believed to be partly for political reasons, but the second version was published largely unchanged in 1975 as his influential text, A Realist Theory of Science.

Bhaskar lectured at the University of Edinburgh from 1975 and later moved to the University of Sussex. He held visiting positions in several Scandinavian universities - adjunct professor in philosophy at the Centre for Peace Studies at the University of Tromsø, Norway, and guest professor in philosophy and social science, Department of Caring Sciences, Örebro University, Sweden. From 2007, Bhaskar was employed at the Institute of Education, in London, where he was working on the application of CR to Peace Studies. He was a founding member of the Centre for Critical Realism, International Association for Critical Realism and the International Centre for Critical Realism (2011), the latter at the Institute of Education.

Bhaskar married Hilary Wainwright in 1971. The couple remained close lifelong friends after their separation and never divorced. He died in Leeds with his partner, Rebecca Long, by his side on 19 November 2014.

== Influences ==
Bhaskar himself lists ten main influences on his early work, including philosophical work on the philosophy of science and language; the sociology of knowledge; Marx (particularly his conception of praxis); structuralist thinkers including Lévi-Strauss, Chomsky and Althusser; the metacritical tradition of Hegel, Kant, and even Descartes; and perspectivalism in the hands of Nietzsche, Fanon, Gramsci and Gandhi.

His dialectical turn engaged more deeply with Hegel, and he called his work in that phase "a non-preservative sublation of Hegelian dialectic" since it draws heavily on Hegel's work but moves beyond and improves on it. He also saw it as preserving and building on his own earlier work and on Marx's work and claimed that "Marx was a proto-dialectical critical realist" but that there remained residues of Hegelian thought in his work.

He abandoned further work on dialectical critical realism, however, after he experienced transcendental meditation. He turned his attention to a variety of Eastern traditions of philosophy, which were the major influences on his later turn to the philosophy of metareality.

== Critical realism ==
Bhaskar's consideration of the philosophies of science and social science resulted in the development of critical realism, a philosophical approach that defends the critical and emancipatory potential of rational (scientific and philosophical) enquiry against both positivist, broadly defined, and 'postmodern' challenges. Its approach emphasises the importance of distinguishing between epistemological and ontological questions and the significance of objectivity properly understood for a critical project. Its conception of philosophy and social science is socially situated but not socially determined; it maintains the possibility for objective critique to motivate social change, with the ultimate end being a promotion of human freedom.

The term "critical realism" was not initially used by Bhaskar. The philosophy began life as what Bhaskar called "transcendental realism" in A Realist Theory of Science (1975), which he extended into the social sciences as critical naturalism in The Possibility of Naturalism (1978). The term "critical realism" is an elision of transcendental realism and critical naturalism and was accepted by Bhaskar after it had been proposed by others.

Critical Realism should not be confused with various other critical realisms, including Georg Lukács' aesthetics, and Alister McGrath's Scientific Theology (or Theological Critical Realism) although they share common goals. In contemporary critical realist texts, "critical realism" is often abbreviated to CR.

Bhaskar's critical realism can be divided into several phases, but he insisted that the later phases preserved and extended the earlier phases of his work, rather than invalidating them. The simplest and most common division is into three phases: original, dialectical, and transcendental. However, original critical realism can also be divided further into transcendental realism and critical naturalism.

== Original critical realism ==
The first 'phase' of Critical Realism accrued a large number of adherents and proponents in Britain, many of whom were involved with the Radical Philosophy Group and related movements. The Radical Philosophy journal was where much of the early CR scholarship first appeared. It argued for an objectivist realist approach to science based on a Kantian transcendental analysis of scientific experimental activity. Stressing the need to retain both the subjective epistemological, or 'transitive', side of knowledge and the objective ontological, or 'intransitive', side, Bhaskar developed a theory of science and social science that he thought would sustain the reality of the objects of science and their knowability but would also incorporate the insights of the 'sociology of knowledge' movement, which emphasised the theory-laden, historically contingent and socially-situated nature of knowledge.

What emerged was a marriage of ontological realism with epistemological relativism that formed an objectivist yet fallibilist theory of knowledge. Bhaskar's main strategy was to argue that reality has depth and that knowledge can penetrate more or less deeply into reality without ever reaching the bottom. Bhaskar said that he reintroduced ontology into the philosophy of science when that was almost heresy. He argued for an ontology of stratified emergence and differentiated structure, which supported the ontological reality of causal powers independent of their empirical effects. Such a move opened up the possibility for a non-reductivist and non-positivistic account of causal explanation in the human and social domain.

That explanatory project was linked with a critical project, the main idea of which is the doctrine of Explanatory Critique. Bhaskar developed it fully in Scientific Realism and Human Emancipation (1987), which developed the critical tradition of ideology critique within a CR framework by arguing that certain kinds of explanatory accounts could lead directly to evaluations and so science could function normatively, not just descriptively, as positivism has assumed since Hume's law. Such a move, it was hoped, would provide the Holy Grail of critical theory, an objective normative foundation.

== Transcendental realism ==
'Transcendental realism' was the term used by Bhaskar to describe the argument that he developed in his first book, A Realist Theory of Science (1975). (Not to be confused with F. W. J. Schelling's transcendental realism, or Arthur Schopenhauer's transcendental realism.) The position is based on Bhaskar's transcendental arguments for certain ontological and epistemological positions based on what reality must be like for scientific knowledge to be possible.

=== Transitive and intransitive domains ===
A Realist Theory of Science starts with a proposed paradox: how do people create knowledge as a product of social activities since knowledge is of things that are not at all produced by people?

The former is inspired by Kuhnian arguments of how scientific communities develop knowledge and asserts all observation is theory-laden based on previously acquired concepts. As such, it is not a naïve realist perspective of knowledge being a direct acquisition of facts through observation of the real world, but it rather considers knowledge to be fallible. That aspect of knowledge is described as the transitive domain of knowledge in that knowledge can change over time.

The second part of the paradox is asserted to be based on a real world, which exists and behaves in the same manner regardless of whether or not people exist or whether they know about the real world. That is described as the intransitive objects of knowledge.

Bhaskar refers to the elimination of the intransitive objects of knowledge and thus the reduction of ontology to epistemology as the epistemic fallacy, which Bhaskar asserts has been made repeatedly over the last 300 years of philosophy of science. The epistemic fallacy "consists in the view that statements about being can be reduced to or analysed in terms of statements about knowledge".

=== Transcendental argument from experimental science ===
The core argument of A Realist Theory of Science begins as a critique of positivist/empiricist understandings of how science works. Bhaskar focuses on the empiricist argument that science produces true knowledge of invariant causal laws by observing causal regularities: "a constant conjunction of events perceived". Bhaskar develops what he calls an immanent critique of empiricism in which he takes some of its core assumptions as correct for the purpose of the argument and then shows that to lead to an incoherence in the empiricist argument. In particular, he accepts the premise that experimental science produces useful knowledge (although he does not commit himself to the claim that the knowledge that it produces is true) and then asks what the world must be like if that is the case. In that sense, his arguments take a similar form to Kant's transcendental arguments, a term that he employs to describe them.

He argues that experimental science is necessary only when and because "the pattern of events forthcoming under experimental conditions would not be forthcoming without it". In experiments, scientists manipulate the conditions to exclude some causal factors so that they can focus on others. Any causal regularity observed is then in part the product of their activity, which is necessary only because the causal regularities do not occur consistently in the outside world, which Bhaskar calls open systems. The regularities are therefore not constant conjunctions in the sense required by empiricism. They are however believed to produce useful knowledge of how the world works, and in particular, scientists form beliefs about how the world outside the laboratory works on the basis of their experiment; however, scientists know that outside the laboratory, the constant conjunctions do not occur. Indeed, doing experimental science makes sense only if it tells us something useful about what occurs beyond the laboratory.

What experimental scientists are learning about, therefore, cannot be causal laws, which are understood as invariant patterns of events. Instead, Bhaskar argues that they are learning about causal mechanisms, which operate as tendencies in the sense that they tend to but do not always bring about certain outcomes. They may operate only under certain conditions, or they may be obstructed by other causal mechanisms since multiple mechanisms interact to produce any given event. The role of experimental scientists is to prevent such obstructions to allow the isolation of a particular mechanism. Mechanisms, or generative mechanisms, as he often calls them, are in turn properties of things (objects), and he usually identifies them as well with the causal powers of those things.

=== Real, actual and empirical domains ===
On that basis, Bhaskar argues that the world can be divided into nested domains of the real, the actual and the empirical.

The domains of depth ontology
	Domain of Real	Domain of Actual	Domain of Empirical
Mechanisms	x		
Events	x	x	
Experiences	x	x	x

The empirical contains the events that people actually experience. It is a subset of the actual, the full set of events that actually occur, regardless of whether or not people are aware of them. That, in turn, is a subset of the real which includes objects, their structures and their causal powers as well. The objects and structures may be able to exert certain causal powers, but the powers may not affect a given situation if the triggering conditions are not present, and even if they are triggered, their characteristic effects may not be actualized if other causal powers obstruct them. The error of empiricism, then, is to build its ontology purely on the category of experience and thus to collapse all three domains into one.

=== Stratification and emergence ===
For Bhaskar, the causal powers of things depend on their structure as complex objects. They are emergent in the sense that they are properties of the whole that appear only as a result of the parts being structured as they are in this type of whole. As Collier explains in his book on Bhaskar's critical realism, that leads to a view of wholes as composed of parts, which are themselves wholes with their own emergent powers. Reality is thus stratified in two senses: in the sense implicit in the division between the empirical, the actual and the real and also in the sense that it consists of things composed of parts that are themselves things at a lower level of stratification.

The relationships between objects and the combinations of their causal powers may create entirely new structures with new causal powers. A typical example is water, which has a causal power of extinguishing fire, but it is made up of hydrogen and oxygen that have causal powers of combustion. That stratification spans in all sciences: physics, chemistry, biology, sociology etc. That implies that objects in sociology (labour markets, capitalism etc.) are just as real as those in physics. The position is not reductionist: each stratum depends on the objects and their relationships in the strata below it, but the difference in causal powers means that they are necessarily different objects.

== Critical naturalism ==
Critical naturalism is the term that Bhaskar used to describe the argument that he develops in his second book The Possibility of Naturalism (1979). He defines naturalism as the view that "social objects can be studied in essentially the same way as natural ones, that is, 'scientifically'". On one hand, Bhaskar argues for naturalism in the sense that the transcendental realist model of science is equally applicable to both the physical and the human worlds. On the other hand, however, he argues that studying the human world is studying something fundamentally different from the physical world and so the strategy to study it must be adapted. Critical naturalism, therefore, implies social scientific methods that seek to identify the mechanisms producing social events but with a recognition that they are in a much greater state of flux than events of the physical world (human structures change much more readily than those of, say, a leaf). In particular, it must be understood that human agency is made possible by social structures that themselves require the reproduction of certain actions/preconditions. Further, the individuals that inhabit the social structures are capable of consciously reflecting upon and changing the actions that produce them, a practice that is in part facilitated by social scientific research.

=== Transformational model of social activity (TMSA) ===
The Transformational Model of the Society/Person Connection

Bhaskar rejects the methodological individualist doctrine that social events can be explained purely in terms of facts about individual persons, but accepts that society has no other material presence than persons and the products of their actions. Equally, he rejects the collectivist notion, which he associated with Émile Durkheim, that reifies social groups and explains the social in terms of the influence of groups to the exclusion of the influence of persons. In fact, Durkheim does not reject psychology in toto. Durkheim spends two chapters of Suicide on psychological explanations of suicide. Durkheim's real position is that not only psychology but also social facts play a role in explaining suicide rates. Instead, Bhaskar argues for an iterative relation between people and society, which he understands as "an ensemble of structures, practices and conventions". People never create society from scratch because it always pre-exists them and provides the context in which they act, but society depends on human activity for its reproduction and/or transformation over time. Society is thus a necessary condition of human action and influences it, but human action is in turn a necessary condition of society, which it continually shapes and reshapes. Bhaskar initially saw the work of Anthony Giddens on duality of structure as consistent with the TMSA, but he later accepted the critique of Giddens by Margaret Archer, who argued that Giddens conflated structure and agency. Archer's own concept of the morphogenetic cycle, which was developed independently, is remarkably similar to the TMSA. That led to both working together under the banner of critical realism.

=== Social structures ===
Bhaskar sees social structures as having emergent properties on the same model as structures in the natural world. However, he enumerates three key differences between social and natural structures, which affect both how they may behave and how they may be studied. Firstly, as described in the TMSA, they "do not exist independently of the activities they govern", which implies that they cannot be empirically identified independently of those activities. Secondly, they depend on "agents' conceptions of what they are doing", which gives a somewhat constructionist understanding of social structures and their dependence on human beliefs and thus the potentials for transforming them. Thirdly, that dependency on beliefs tends to make them less enduring and more easily transformed than natural structures.

=== Agency ===
Bhaskar understands human beings primarily as material beings who have the capacity of intentional action as an emergent consequence of their neurophysiological complexity. On that basis, he rejects reductionist explanations of human action as determined purely physiologically, and he argues instead for what he calls "synchronic emergent powers materialism". He concludes, "The powers associated with the mind are both real, that is, causally efficacious... and irreducible, that is, emergent from matter". That enables him to argue that reasons can be causes of human behaviour since reasons are examples of emergent mental powers, which entails that humans can explain human action (at least partly) in terms of intentionality.

=== Explanatory critique and ethical naturalism ===
One of the core themes of Bhaskar's work, which he returns to several times across its different phases, is that philosophical arguments can be provided to support sociopolitical critique. His first attempt to provide such support comes in the form of the concept of explanatory critique, which was first introduced in The Possibility of Naturalism but developed more fully in Scientific Realism and Human Emancipation (1987). His argument is that if other things are equal, if something (S) is responsible for producing a false belief, one may proceed to a negative ethical evaluation of S and to a positive evaluation of action directed at its removal. It helps to explain the argument to think of it as related to Marxist ideology critique in which S is some sort of social structure, say capitalism, that produces false beliefs (ideology) but in which the basis of the critical response is not the harms caused by capitalism but that it misleads people about its true nature. The importance of that argument, Bhaskar suggests, is that it underpins the critical potential of the human sciences since they can provide a basis for political action by revealing the falsity of beliefs and their sources.

Bhaskar later extends the argument from that cognitive form of explanatory critique, which argues that the sources of false knowledge should be removed, to a needs-based form, which applies a similar argument to sources of failures to meet human needs. In terms of the previous example, that would be like arguing that capitalism should be removed because it causes human suffering, rather than because it misleads people.

Bhaskar claims that argument refutes what is sometimes known as 'Hume's Law': the claim that an ethical conclusion cannot be derived from purely-factual premises. Indeed, he argues that as long as a belief is known to be false, there is sufficient grounds for a negative evaluation of it and for action directed at its removal. That, on his account, provides sufficient grounds for ethical naturalism, the belief that ethical conclusions can be derived from purely-factual premises, which also seems to entail moral realism, the belief that some ethical claims are objectively correct.

== Dialectical critical realism ==
The second phase of Critical Realism, the dialectic turn initiated in Dialectic: the Pulse of Freedom (1993) and developed further in Plato, etc (1994), won some new adherents but drew criticism from some critical realists. It argued for the 'dialecticising' of CR, by an elaborate reading of Georg Wilhelm Friedrich Hegel and Karl Marx. Arguing against Hegel and with Marx that dialectical connections, relations and contradictions are themselves ontological (objectively real), Bhaskar developed a concept of real absence, which he claimed could provide a more robust foundation for the reality and the objectivity of values and criticism. He attempted to incorporate critical rational human agency into the dialectic figure with his 'Fourth Dimension' of dialectic, which would ground a systematic model for rational emancipatory transformative practice.

== Transcendental dialectical critical realism ==
In 2000, Bhaskar published From East to West: The Odyssey of a Soul in which he first expressed ideas related to spiritual values that came to be seen as the beginning of his so-called 'spiritual' turn, which led to the final phase of critical realism, dubbed 'Transcendental Dialectical Critical Realism'. That publication and the ones that followed it were highly controversial and led to something of a split among Bhaskar's proponents. Some respected Critical Realists cautiously supported Bhaskar's 'spiritual turn', but others took the view that the development had compromised the status of critical realism as a serious philosophical movement.

In his Reflections on Meta-Reality, he describes meta-reality as "a new philosophical standpoint". The main departure, it seems, is an emphasis on the shift away from Western dualism to a non-dual model in which emancipation entails "a breakdown, an overcoming, of the duality and separateness between things." Jamie Morgan's paper 'What is Meta-Reality' provides a very clear introduction to that phase of Bhaskar's work.

== Politics ==
Bhaskar's programme was intensely political. He thought of it as "underlabouring" for the work done in the human sciences in pursuit of "the project of human self-emancipation". One of the threads that unites the different phases of his work is a continuing commitment to providing philosophical support for emancipatory politics.

He is sometimes described as a Marxist thinker, but his relationship to Marxism was ambivalent. In a debate with Bhaskar, a well-known Marxist, Alex Callinicos, identified him as "a significant contributor to contemporary Marxist thought, broadly understood". In the same discussion, Bhaskar endorsed some key elements of Marx's thought, including his explanatory account of the deep structures of the capitalist mode of production. Bhaskar clearly admired Marx as a philosopher of emancipation and both drew on and built on aspects of that work, at least up to and including the period of dialectical critical realism.

However, during the same debate with Callinicos, Bhaskar referred to "The Marxists", as if the term did not include himself, and criticised them for neglecting the role of women in domestic labour. When he pinned his colours to a political flag, it was the more general flag of socialism. Despite his endorsement in the debate with Callinicos, he rarely paid much attention to the less philosophical aspects of Marx's work, including political economy and class politics. It might be fairer to see Bhaskar's work as intersecting with the Marxist tradition, rather than as being part of it. His work relates to politics primarily at a philosophical level. He rarely involved himself with questions of practical politics, with the exception of his late collaborative work on climate change.

== Criticism ==
=== Transcendental realism ===
Criticisms have been levelled at the substance of Bhaskar's arguments at various points.

One objection, raised by Callinicos and others, is that Bhaskar's so-called "transcendental arguments" are not really that. They are not typical transcendental arguments as philosophers such as Charles Taylor have defined them, the distinguishing feature of which is the identification of some putative condition on the possibility of experience. (However, his arguments function in an analogous way since they try to argue that scientific practice would be unintelligible and/or inexplicable in the absence of the ontological features he identifies.)

On the other hand, some critics have taken Bhaskar at his word by criticising his use of transcendental arguments on the grounds that the term suggests (because of its usage by Kant) that such arguments provide foundational conclusions with absolute certainty, but Bhaskar elsewhere advocated a fallibilist view of knowledge. Bhaskar, however, repeatedly clarified that "transcendental realism is fallible, as corrigible as the outcome of any other piece of human argument".

Bhaskar's claim that the theory of explanatory critique justifies ethical naturalism and/or moral realism has also been criticised, including by other critical realists, as committing the naturalistic fallacy. Martyn Hammersley argues, for example, that the needs-based version of explanatory critique smuggles a value premise into the supposedly purely-factual premises of the argument because the concept of need already carries an ethical implication that the need should be met. Similarly, Dave Elder-Vass argues that the cognitive version of explanatory critique rests on the ethical premise that false knowledge is a bad thing. If Bhaskar's argument rests on ethical premises like either of these, then it fails to provide examples of the derivation of ethical conclusions from purely-factual premises, which would appear to disprove his claim that the theory of explanatory critique provides a justification for ethical naturalism.

=== Dialectical critical realism ===
His early books were considered "models of clarity and rigour", but Bhaskar has been criticised for the "truly appalling style" (Alex Callinicos, 1994) in which his "dialectical" works were written. He won the Bad Writing Contest in 1996, for a passage taken from Plato etc. (1994).

Bhaskar's concept of real absence has been questioned by some like Andrew Collier, who argues that it fails to distinguish properly between real and nominal absences.

=== Transcendental dialectical critical realism ===
Bhaskar's most recent 'spiritual' phase has been criticised by many adherents of early critical realism for departing from the fundamental positions that had made it important and interesting without providing philosophical support for his new ideas. Jamie Morgan's summary of meta-reality provides a number of careful challenges to Bhaskar's argument.

== Bibliography ==
- Bhaskar, R., 1997 [1975], A Realist Theory of Science, London: Verso. ISBN 1-85984-103-1
- Bhaskar, R., 1998 [1979], The Possibility of Naturalism (3rd edition), London: Routledge. ISBN 0-415-19874-7
- Bhaskar, R., 1987, Scientific Realism and Human Emancipation, London: Verso. (ch.1)
- Bhaskar, R., 1989, Reclaiming Reality: A Critical Introduction to Contemporary Philosophy, London: Verso. ISBN 0-86091-951-X
- Bhaskar, R., 1990, Philosophy and the Idea of Freedom, London: Blackwell.
- Bhaskar, R. (Ed.). 1990, Harre and his critics: Essays in honour of Rom Harre with his commentary on them. Oxford: Blackwell.
- Bhaskar, R., & Edgley, R. (Eds.). 1991. A meeting of minds: Socialists discuss philosophy. London: Socialist Society.
- Bhaskar, R., 1993, Dialectic: The Pulse of Freedom, London: Verso. ISBN 0-86091-583-2
- Bhaskar, R., 1994, Plato, etc.: The Problems of Philosophy and Their Resolution, London: Verso. ISBN 0-86091-649-9
- Bhaskar, R., 2000, From east to west: Odyssey of a soul. London: Routledge.
- Bhaskar, R., 2002, Reflections on Meta-Reality: A Philosophy for the Present, New Delhi/London Sage. ISBN 0-7619-9691-5
- Bhaskar, R., 2002, From science to emancipation: Alienation and the actuality of enlightenment. London: SAGE.
- Bhaskar, R., 2002, The Philosophy of Meta-Reality: Creativity, Love and Freedom. New Delhi: Sage Publications.
- Bhaskar, R., 2002, Reflections on Meta-Reality: Transcendence, Enlightenment, and Everyday Life. Thousand Oaks, Calif.: Sage Publications.
- Bhaskar, R., 2002, Beyond east and west: spirituality and comparative religion in an age of global crisis. New Delhi; Thousand Oaks, CA: Sage Publications.
- Bhaskar, R., 2006, Understanding Peace and Security. Routledge.
- Bhaskar, R., et al. 2007, Interdisciplinary and Health. Routledge.
- Bhaskar, R., 2008, Fathoming the depths of reality. London: Routledge.
- Bhaskar, R. et al. 2008, The formation of critical realism: a personal perspective. London; New York: Routledge.
- Bhaskar, R. et al. (eds.) 2010, Interdisciplinarity and climate change: transforming knowledge and practice for our global future. Abingdon, Oxon; New York: Routledge.
- Bhaskar, R. 2016. Enlightened Common Sense: the Philosophy of Critical Realism. Abingdon, Oxon; New York: Routledge.
- Bhaskar, R. et al. 2018. Interdisciplinarity and Wellbeing: A Critical Realist General Theory of Interdisciplinarity. Abingdon, Oxon; New York: Routledge.

== See also ==
- Critical realism
- Structure and agency
