= Transcendental argument =

Deductive philosophical argument

A transcendental argument is a kind of deductive argument that appeals to the necessary conditions that make something else possible. They are often anti-skeptical arguments referring to the conditions making experience or knowledge possible. The philosopher Immanuel Kant gave transcendental arguments both their name and their notoriety. The influence of Ludwig Wittgenstein also made transcendental arguments popular.

== The arguments ==
Typically, a transcendental argument starts from some proposition, and then makes the case that its truth or falsehood contradicts the necessary conditions for it to be possible to know, think or argue about it.

So-called progressive transcendental arguments begin with an apparently indubitable and universally accepted statement about people's experiences of the world. They use this to make substantive knowledge-claims about the world, e.g., that it is causally and spatiotemporally related. They start with what is left at the end of the skeptic's process of doubting.

Progressive transcendental arguments take the form of modus ponens with modal operators:

If possibly P, then necessarily Q.
Actually P.
Therefore, necessarily Q.

Regressive transcendental arguments, on the other hand, begin at the same point as the skeptic, e.g., the fact that we have experience of a causal and spatiotemporal world, and show that certain notions are implicit in our conceptions of such experience. Regressive transcendental arguments are more conservative in that they do not purport to make substantive ontological claims about the world.

Regressive transcendental arguments take the form of modus tollens with modal operators:

If possibly P, then necessarily Q.
Actually not Q.
Therefore, necessarily not P.

Transcendental arguments are often used to refute skepticism. For example:

1. If we have knowledge, universal skepticism is false.
2. We have knowledge. (If we did not, we couldn't possibly argue that universal skepticism is true)
3. Universal skepticism is false.

Kant uses an example in his refutation of idealism. Idealists believe that objects have no existence independent of the mind. Briefly, Kant shows that:

1. since idealists acknowledge that we have an inner mental life, and
2. an inner life of self-awareness is bound up with the concepts of objects which are not inner, and which interact causally,
3. We must have legitimate experience of outer objects which interact causally.

He has not established that outer objects exist, but only that the concept of them is legitimate, contrary to idealism.

Robert Lockie makes a transcendental argument for libertarian free will:

1. If we want to know truth, we have free will.
2. We want to know the truth about free will.
3. We have free will.

However, not all use of transcendental arguments is intended to counter skepticism. The Dutch philosopher Herman Dooyeweerd used transcendental critique to establish the conditions that make a theoretical (or scientific) attitude of thought (not just the process of thinking, as in Kant) possible. In particular, he showed that theoretical thought is not independent (or neutral) of pre-commitments and relationships but are rather grounded in commitments, attitudes, and presuppositions that are "religious" in nature.

C.S. Lewis made transcendental arguments to prove the existence of God and refute naturalism.

== Kant ==
It was Immanuel Kant who gave transcendental arguments their name and notoriety. It is open to controversy, though, whether his own transcendental arguments should be classified as progressive or regressive.

In the Critique of Pure Reason (1781) Kant developed one of philosophy's most famous transcendental arguments in 'The Deduction of the Pure Concepts of the Understanding'. In the 'Transcendental Aesthetic', Kant used transcendental arguments to show that sensory experiences would not be possible if we did not impose their spatial and temporal forms on them, making space and time "conditions of the possibility of experience".

== Criticisms of transcendental arguments ==
One of the main uses of transcendental arguments is to appeal to something that cannot be consistently denied to counter skeptics' arguments that we cannot know something about the nature of the world. One need not be a skeptic about those matters, however, to find transcendental arguments unpersuasive. There are a number of ways that one might deny that a given transcendental argument gives us knowledge of the world. The following responses may suit some versions and not others.

- First, critics respond by claiming that the arguer cannot be sure that he or she is having particular experiences. That a person cannot be sure about the nature of his or her own experiences may initially seem bizarre. However, it may be claimed that the very act of thinking about or, even more, describing our experiences in words, involves interpreting them in ways that go beyond so-called 'pure' experience.
- Second, skeptics object to the use of transcendental arguments to draw conclusions about the nature of the world by claiming that even if a person does know the nature of his or her experiences, that person cannot know that the reasoning from these experiences to conclusions about the world is accurate.
- Lastly, critics have debated whether showing that we must think of the world in a certain way, given certain features of experience, is tantamount to showing that the world answers to that conception. Perhaps transcendental arguments show only the necessities of our cognitive apparatus rather than the realities of the world apart from us. This objection may amount to throwing doubt on whether transcendental arguments are ever more than merely "regressive".

== See also ==
- Transcendental idealism
- Transcendental argument for the existence of God

== Bibliography ==
- Brueckner, Anthony. " Transcendental Arguments I". Nous 17 (4): 551-575. and "Transcendental Arguments II". Nous 18 (2): 197-225.
- Stapleford, Scott Kant's Transcendental Arguments: Disciplining Pure Reason - Continuum Publishing 2008 (ISBN 978-0-8264-9928-8 - hb)
- Stern, Robert, ed.Transcendental Arguments: Problems and Prospect. Oxford: Clarendon.
- Stroud, Barry. "Transcendental Arguments". Journal of Philosophy 65 (1968) 241-56.
- Taylor, Charles. "The Validity of Transcendental Arguments". Reprinted in Philosophical Arguments. Cambridge, MA: Harvard University Press, 1955.
