= Outline of sociology =

Overview of and topical guide to sociology

The following outline is provided as an overview of and topical guide to the discipline of sociology:

Sociology is the systematic study of society, human social behavior, and patterns of social relationships, social interaction, and culture. The term sociology was coined in the late 18th century to describe the scientific study of society. It uses a range of methods — from qualitative interviews to quantitative data analysis — to examine how social structures, institutions, and processes shape individual and group life. Sociology encompasses various subfields such as criminology, medical sociology, education, and increasingly, digital sociology, which studies the impact of digital technologies on society. Digital sociology examines the impact of digital technologies on social behavior and institutions, encompassing professional, analytical, critical, and public dimensions. The internet has reshaped social networks and power relations, illustrating the growing importance of digital sociology. Sociologists seek to understand how identities, inequalities, norms, and institutions evolve across time and context.

== Nature of sociology ==
=== Definition ===
Sociology can be described as all of the following:

- The study of society.
- Academic discipline – body of knowledge given to - or received by - a disciple (student); a branch or sphere of knowledge, or field of study, that an individual has chosen to specialise in.
- Field of science – widely recognized category of specialized expertise within science, and typically embodies its own terminology and nomenclature. Such a field will usually be represented by one or more scientific journals, where peer reviewed research is published. There are many sociology-related scientific journals.
  - Social science – field of academic scholarship that explores aspects of human society.

=== Essence of sociology ===
==== Overall ====
Sociology

==== Key themes across sociological research ====
- Society
- Globalization
- Human behavior
- Human environmental impact
- Identity
- Industrial revolutions 3 & 4
- Social complexity
- Social environment
- Social equality
- Social equity
- Social power
- Social stratification
- Social structure

== Branches of sociology ==
- Sociology of aging
- Sociology of architecture
- Sociology of art
- Sociology of autism
- Sociology of the body
- Sociology of culture
- Sociology of death
- Sociology of deviance
- Sociology of disaster
- Sociology of education
- Economic sociology
- Sociology of emotions
- Environmental sociology
- Feminist sociology
- Sociology of the family
- Sociology of food
- Sociology of gender
- Sociology of generations
- Sociology of health and illness
- Historical sociology
- Sociology of human consciousness
- Humanistic sociology
- Sociology of immigration
- Industrial sociology
- Sociology of the Internet
- Jealousy sociology
- Sociology of Jewry
- Sociology of knowledge
- Sociology of language
- Sociology of law
- Sociology of leisure
- Sociology of literature
- Marxist sociology
- Mathematical sociology
- Medical sociology
- Military sociology
- Sociology of music
- Real utopian sociology
- Sociology of peace, war, and social conflict
- Sociology of philosophy
- Social psychology (sociology)
- Public sociology
- Sociology of punishment
- Sociology of race and ethnic relations
- Sociology of religion
- Sociology of scientific knowledge (Sociology of the history of science)
- Sociology of sociology
- Sociology of space
- Sociology of sport
- Sociology of terrorism
- Urban sociology
- Visual sociology

== Digital sociology ==
Digital sociology is a growing subfield that examines how digital media and technologies affect social behavior, institutions, and patterns of interaction. The field draws on classical and contemporary sociological theory to analyze the influence of the internet, social media, algorithms, and digital surveillance on daily life and social systems.

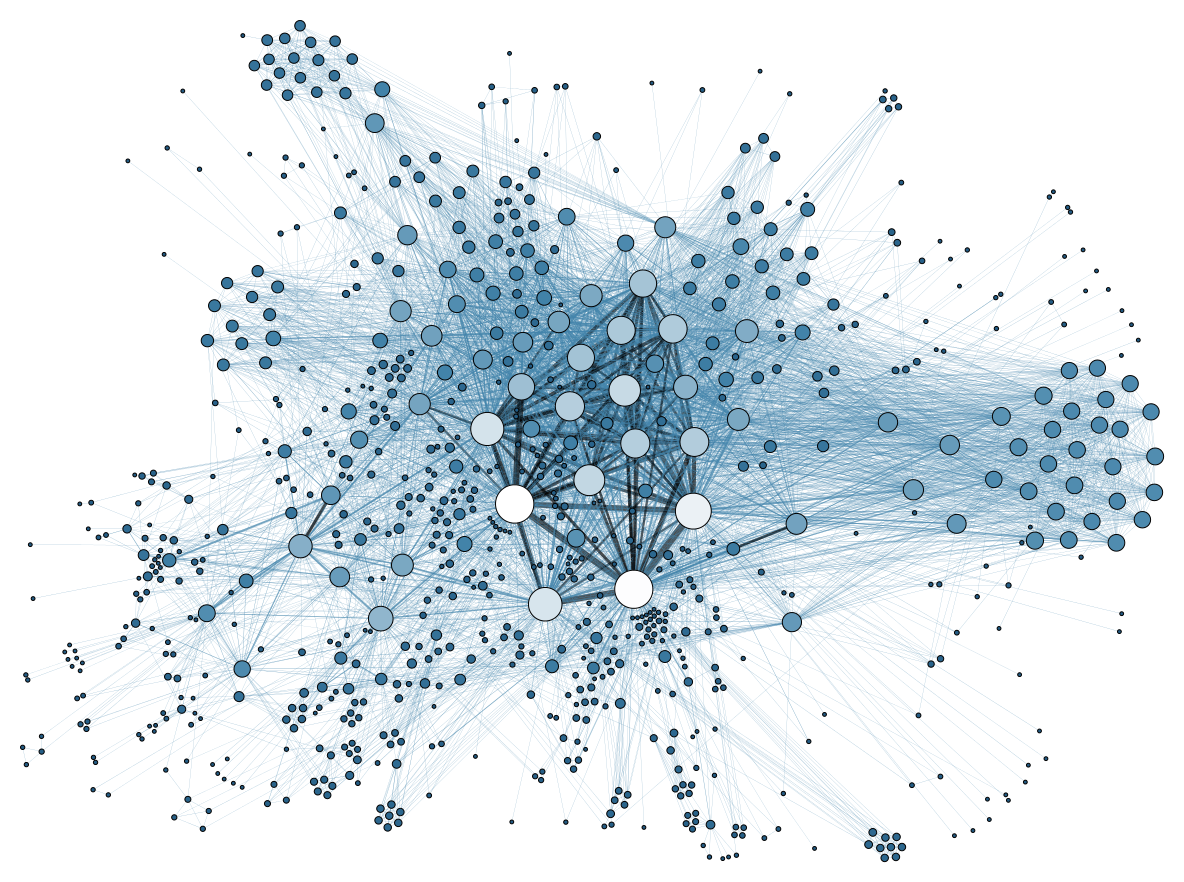
A network visualization used in digital sociology to analyze online interactions and communities.

According to sociologist Deborah Lupton, digital sociology includes four key dimensions: professional digital practice (using digital media for academic purposes), analytical digital sociology (analyzing digital data and online behavior), critical digital sociology (examining the power structures behind digital technologies), and public digital sociology (engaging with broader audiences through digital platforms).

Manuel Castells’ work on network societies also highlights how the internet has fundamentally reshaped communication, organization, and relationships in the modern world. This shift has created new forms of inequality and social capital, while transforming traditional institutions such as education, work, and government.

Digital sociology has become increasingly relevant in the 21st century as social life becomes more integrated with digital technologies. It overlaps with fields such as media studies, data science, and science and technology studies, and often uses digital ethnography, big data analysis, and content analysis as methods.

Digital sociology is not only concerned with technology but with the broader implications of a digitally mediated society. It offers insights into how digital environments shape identity, relationships, activism, privacy, and social norms.

=== Multidisciplinary and interdisciplinary fields involving sociology ===
- Ageing studies
- Agnotology
- Anthrozoology
- Area studies
- Astrosociology
- Behavioral economics
- Communication studies
- Community informatics
- Criminal studies
- Critical management studies
- Cultural studies
- Demography
- Development studies
- Development theory
- Disability studies
- Environmental studies
- Ethnic studies
- Food studies
- Futures studies
- Gender studies
- Geodemography
- Global studies
- Gerontology
- Historical sociology
- Human ecology
- Internet studies
- Leisure studies
- Political ecology
- Political sociology
- Organizational studies
- Religious studies
- Science studies
- Science, technology and society
- Social architecture
- Social construction of technology
- Social engineering
- Social epistemology
- Social geography
- Social informatics
- Social philosophy
- Social studies of finance
- Sociobiology
- Sociocybernetics
- Socioeconomic status
- Sociolinguistics
- Sociomusicology
- Technology and society
- Urban studies
- Victimology
- World-systems theory

== History of sociology ==
- History of sociology
- Timeline of sociology
- Timeline of sociology (1810s)
- Timeline of sociology (1820s)
- Timeline of sociology (1830s)
- Timeline of sociology (1840s)
- Timeline of sociology (1850s)
- Timeline of sociology (1860s)
- Timeline of sociology (1870s)
- Timeline of sociology (1880s)
- Timeline of sociology (1890s)
- Timeline of sociology (1900s)
- Timeline of sociology (1910s)
- Timeline of sociology (1920s)
- Timeline of sociology (1930s)
- Timeline of sociology (1940s)
- Timeline of sociology (1950s)
- Timeline of sociology (1960s)
- Timeline of sociology (1970s)
- Timeline of sociology (1980s)
- Timeline of sociology (1990s)
- Timeline of sociology (2000s)

== Theoretical perspectives in sociology ==
=== Approaches ===
==== Positivism ====
- Positivism (Empirical sociology)
- Analytical sociology
- Computational sociology
- Logical positivism
- Rational choice theory

==== Critical realist ====
- Critical realism
- Relational sociology
- Subtle realism

==== Structural ====
- Structuralism
- Organizational theory
- Sociocultural evolution
- Structural functionalism
- Systems theory
- World-systems theory

==== Challenging structure ====
- Postmodernism
- Poststructuralism
- Social constructionism

==== Social interactions ====
- Dramaturgy (sociology)
- Ethnomethodology
- Figurational sociology
- Phenomenology (sociology)
- Symbolic interactionism

==== Behavioural ====
- Psychoanalytic sociology
- Social exchange theory

==== Social justice ====
- Critical theory
- Conflict theories
- Feminist theory
- Intersectionality
- Marxism (Marxist sociology - Social conflict theory)
- Postcolonialism & subaltern theory
- Queer theory

==== Applied ====
- Pure sociology
- Policy sociology

==== Ecological ====
- Human ecology

=== Levels of analysis ===
- Macrosociology
- Mesosociology
- Microsociology

== Methodology and methods in sociology ==
- Comparative sociology
- Content analysis
- Discourse analysis
- Ethnomethodology
- Sociography
- Sociomapping
- Sociometry
- Social experiment

== General sociology concepts ==
- Attitude
- Alienation
- Beliefs
- Bureaucracy
- Collective behavior
- Civil inattention
- Civil rights
- Crime
- Commodity fetishism
- Community (outline)
- Consumption (consumerism)
- Cultural capital
- Culture (outline)
- Discrimination
- Division of labour
- Equality (Social inequality)
- Equity
- Exploitation
- Family
- Freedom
- Gemeinschaft and gesellschaft
- Globalization
- Group
- Ideal type
- Identity
- Ideology
- Industrialization
- Inequality
- Institution
- Interpersonal relationship (outline)
- Justice
- Lifestyle
- Mass media
- Modernity
- Nature versus nurture
- Organization
- Organizational behavior
- Paradigm shift
- Political economy
- Popular culture
- Postmodernity
- Poverty
- Power
- Power-knowledge
- Racism
- Rationalisation
- Reflexivity
- Religion
- Secularisation
- Sexism
- Social action
- Social capital
- Social change
- Social class
- Social complexity
- Social conflict
- Social construction
- Social cohesion
- Social control
- Social criticism
- Social environment
- Social evolutionism
- Social justice
- Social media
- Social mobility
- Social movement
- Social norm
- Social network
- Social order
- Social organisation
- Social problems
- Social solidarity
- Social status
- Social stratification
- Social structure
- Social system
- Social theory
- Socialization
- Society (outline)
- Structure and agency
- Sustainable development
- Values
- World view

== Sociology by location ==
- Sociology in China
- Sociology in Japan
- Sociology in Poland
- Sociology in Russia
- Sociology in Turkey

== Sociologists ==
- List of sociologists

== Sociological publications ==
Sociology journals
Magazines

- Contexts
- MANAS Journal
- Polemic
- Salmagundi
- Youth Studies Australia

Sociology books

== Sociological associations ==
Sociological associations

== Academies ==
- College of Sociology, Paris, 1937–39
- New School for Social Research, New York
- Department of Sociology at the University of Chicago, Chicago
- Department of Sociology and Social Work at Uzhhorod National University, Uzhhorod
- Atlanta Sociological Laboratory, Atlanta, 1895–1924

== Related fields ==
- Global studies
- Law
- Political science
- Social anthropology/Cultural anthropology
- Social history
- Socioeconomics
- Sociolinguistics
- Social research

== See also ==
- Bibliography of sociology
- Engaged theory
- History of the social sciences
- Index of sociology articles
- Index of sociology of food articles
- Index of urban sociology articles
- Outline of organizational theory
- Outline of science
