= Performative interval =

The performative interval in sociology refers to a unit of analysis in the interaction order defined by the disjunct between practice and the self, or between what an actor "does" and what an actor "is".

The concept is developed by sociologist Adam Isaiah Green, University of Toronto, as a heuristic device to illustrate the irreducibility of the self to a social category in symbolic interactionist and queer theory renderings of the subject (Green 2007). In Green's reflection on these two latter literatures, the actor "acts toward" a given social category — be it a racial, ethnic, gender or sexual orientation classification — through aligning behavior, affect and the body with norms that define the category. Nevertheless, the category is never fully realized in the self, an insight that builds directly on Judith Butler's (1997) conception of "performative failure" (for more, see the concept of performativity), but also on the earlier sociological work of Mead and Goffman, among others. According to Green, whereas pragmatist and interactionist sociological approaches to the self typically focus on how a given actor shores up the gap between "doing" and "being" in the performative interval, queer theory focuses on the inability of the self to ever realize a social category as an ontological property of the self. Rather, for queer theorists and within poststructuralism more generally, the self is an ever-dissolving iteration of a norm absent a knowable interior or a stable core.

== See also ==
- Outline of sociology#General sociology concepts
