= History and philosophy of science =

Academic discipline

The history and philosophy of science (HPS) is an academic discipline that encompasses the history of science and the philosophy of science. Although many scholars in the field are trained primarily as either historians or as philosophers, there are degree-granting departments of HPS at several prominent universities. Though philosophy of science and history of science are their own disciplines, history and philosophy of science is a discipline in its own right.

Philosophy of science is a branch of philosophy concerned with the foundations, methods, and implications of science. The central questions of this study concern what qualifies as science, the reliability of scientific theories, and the ultimate purpose of science. This discipline overlaps with metaphysics/ontology and epistemology, for example, when it explores the relationship between science and truth. Philosophy of science focuses on metaphysical, epistemic and semantic aspects of science. Ethical issues such as bioethics and scientific misconduct are often considered ethics or science studies rather than philosophy of science.

There is no consensus among philosophers about many of the central problems concerned with the philosophy of science, including whether science can reveal the truth about unobservable things and whether scientific reasoning can be justified at all. In addition to these general questions about science as a whole, philosophers of science consider problems that apply to particular sciences (such as astronomy, biology, chemistry, Earth science, or physics). Some philosophers of science also use contemporary results in science to reach conclusions about philosophy itself.

== History ==
One origin of the unified discipline is the historical approach to the discipline of the philosophy of science. This hybrid approach is reflected in the career of Thomas Kuhn. His first permanent appointment, at the University of California, Berkeley, was to a position advertised by the philosophy department, but he also taught courses from the history department. When he was promoted to full professor in the history department only, Kuhn was offended at the philosophers' rejection because "I sure as hell wanted to be there, and it was my philosophy students who were working with me, not on philosophy but on history, were nevertheless my more important students". This attitude is also reflected in his historicist approach, as outlined in Kuhn's seminal Structure of Scientific Revolutions (1962, 2nd ed. 1970), wherein philosophical questions about scientific theories and, especially, theory change are understood in historical terms, employing concepts such as paradigm shift.

However, Kuhn was also critical of attempts fully to unify the methods of history and philosophy of science: "Subversion is not, I think, too strong a term for the likely result of an attempt to make the two fields into one. They differ in a number of their central constitutive characteristics, of which the most general and apparent is their goals. The final product of most historical research is a narrative, a story, about particulars of the past. [...] The philosopher, on the other hand, aims principally at explicit generalizations and at those with universal scope. He is no teller of stories, true or false. His goal is to discover and state what is true at all times and places rather than to impart understanding of what occurred at a particular time and place." More recent work questions whether these methodological and conceptual divisions are in fact barriers to a unified discipline.

== See also ==
- Index of philosophy of science articles
- Historical epistemology
- Historiography of science
- History of science and technology
- Sociology of the history of science
