= Martyn Hammersley =

British sociologist (born 1949)

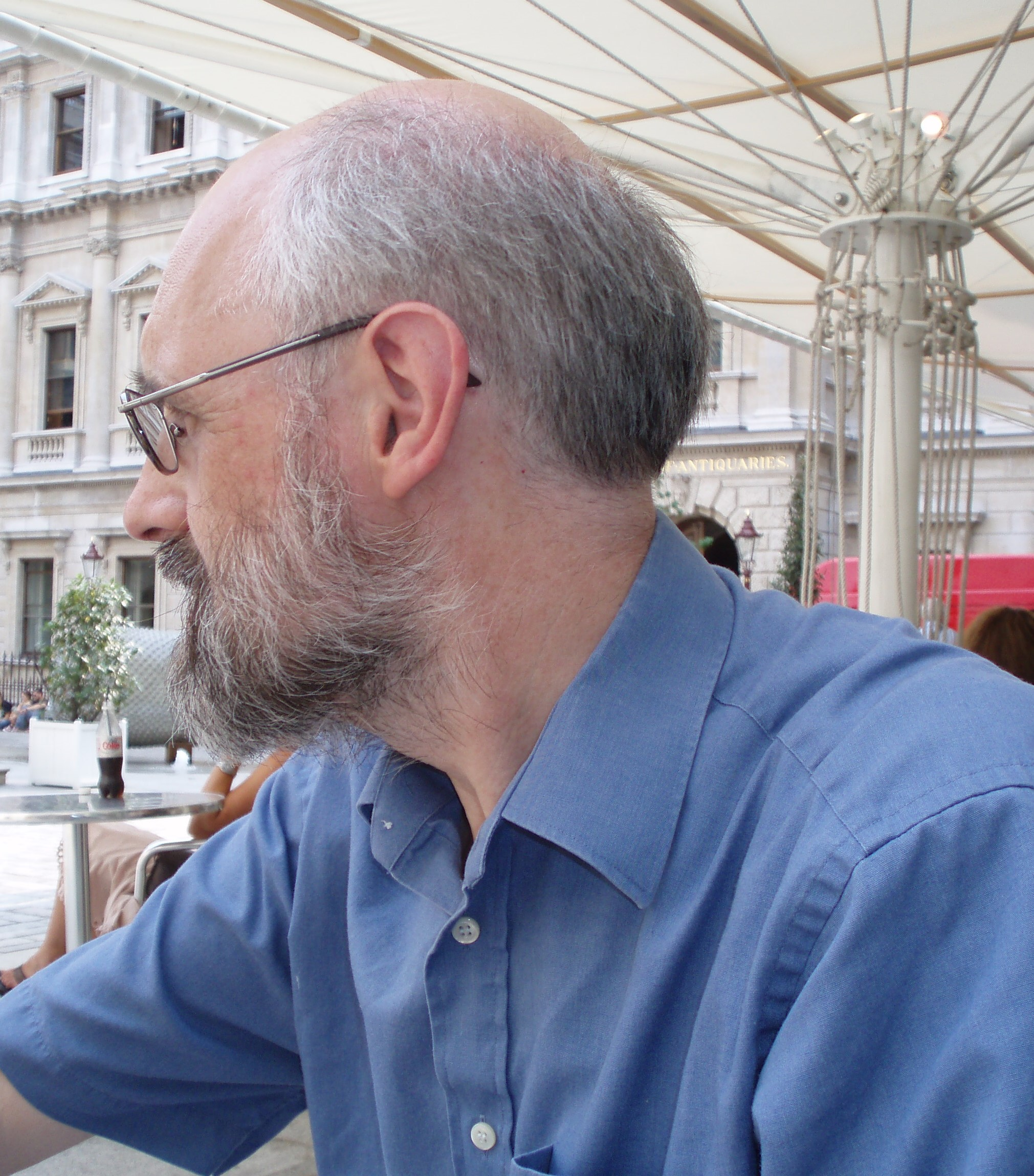
Martyn Hammersley, London 2009

Martyn Hammersley (born 1949) is a British sociologist whose main publications cover social research methodology and philosophical issues in the social sciences.

== Biography ==
He studied sociology as an undergraduate at the London School of Economics (1967–70), and was subsequently a postgraduate student in the sociology department at the University of Manchester, obtaining an MPhil and PhD with a thesis reporting an ethnography of an inner-city secondary school. At that time Manchester was a major centre for ethnomethodology, where it was in tension with symbolic interactionism and Marxism, and his work was influenced by all of these approaches.

After a research fellowship and temporary lectureship at Manchester, he obtained a permanent position at The Open University in 1975. He was recruited to work on E202 Schooling and Society, a course that was subsequently embroiled in a public controversy about 'Marxist bias'. He remained at the Open University until retirement in 2015, when he became Emeritus Professor of Education and Social Research.

== Sociological work ==
Hammersley's early research was in the sociology of education, with a particular focus on processes of classroom interaction in secondary schools. He joined the Open University at a time when it was one of the leading centres for the 'new sociology of education', and he was involved in subsequent debates about the character and value of the various kinds of work coming under this heading.

Many of his publications have been concerned with methodological and philosophical issues arising in sociology, and across the social sciences generally. These issues have included: the nature and role of theory, the criteria by which qualitative research should be evaluated, and the issues of objectivity and value neutrality. He wrote a book on Herbert Blumer's methodological ideas, locating these in historical context. He has written a number of articles on analytic induction (an approach developed by Florian Znaniecki), examining its history. In What's Wrong with Ethnography?, he advocates what he referred to as "subtle realism", as opposed to various forms of relativism and scepticism. With Paul Atkinson, he wrote an introduction to ethnography, now in its fourth edition.

He has also examined issues surrounding the qualitative-quantitative divide, and the nature of qualitative research.

More recently he has co-authored a book on ethics and qualitative research. He is a critic of ethical regulation, in other words of institutional review boards and research ethics committees, and has sought to clarify the concept of academic freedom.

Hammersley has been involved in a series of controversies, for example over feminist methodology, about racism and anti-racist research, and concerning the character of qualitative research and the criteria of validity appropriate to it. He has also questioned the arguments of the evidence-based practice movement. In The Limits of Social Science, he argued that social science is limited to the discovery of value-relevant explanations for social phenomena, a position that is at odds with the grandiose claims frequently made for its potential contribution to public policy making and to transformative political action. He has also questioned recent advocacy of a 'normative turn' in sociology.

He has written about ethnomethodology, assessing its radical claims. He has produced books about the concept of culture and about other key sociological concepts. Most recently, he has written articles about the sociologist Karl Mannheim, a book on Methodological Concepts, and a Dictionary of Social Research Methodology.
