= Sociology in Japan =

Sociology is the methodological and scientific study of human society. It studies the social interactions between a person and society as well as the social patterns between societies, groups, nations, institutions, etc. Sociologists research the relationships between social structures and human lives. They also aim to solve the corresponding social issues revealed from the researches.

Sociology in Japan or Shakai-Ishikiron (“social consciousness studies”) emerged during the Meiji Revolution (1868) and developed with the establishment of the first chair of Sociology at Tokyo University in 1893. It has been integrated into the educational system of Japan as a result of modernisation and has been largely influenced by Western sociology.

== Origin ==
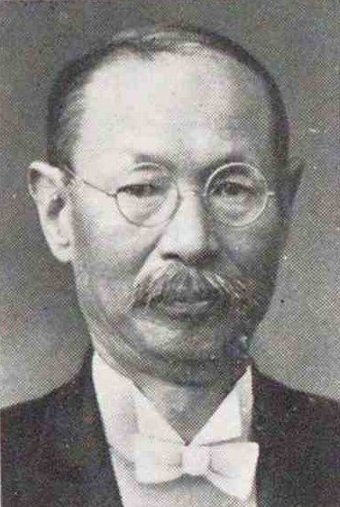
Takebe Tongo, Chair of Sociology at Tokyo University

The general recognition of sociology in Japan can be dated to the Meiji Revolution of 1868. At that time, the revolution influenced the modernisation progress of Japan and created changes to both the social and political structures of the nation.

The sociology of Herbert Spencer was first introduced to Japan with the arrival of Ernest Fenollosa, a visiting professor of philosophy and political economy at Tokyo University. This and the subsequent creation of the first Chair of Sociology led by Toyama Shōichi are milestones in establishing Japanese Sociology. Takebe Tongo was the first Chair of Sociology at Tokyo University, which was then called the Tokyo Imperial University. His work of General Principles of Sociology (1905–1908) was the first systematic work on sociology in Japan and imposed great influence on the study's future development.

== Development ==
The development of sociology in Japan can be generally categorised into four stages based on the various social, cultural structures and national policies at different stages of time.

=== Stage 1: Pre-World War II (1878–1945) ===
Japanese sociology at its initial stage focused primarily on philosophical orientations and was largely influenced by sociological theories from Europe.

Sociology was first taught at Tokyo University in 1878 by Fenollosa, who was at that time a visiting professor of philosophy and political economy. Three years later, he was accompanied by Masakazu Toyama, who afterwards became the first official sociology professor in Japan and was awarded the title of "The Founder of Japanese Sociology". Both Fenollosa and Masakazu were promoters of Herbert Spencer's sociological theory which made Spencer's works significantly important to Japanese Sociology in the early years.

Other Western sociological theories were introduced to Japan during the late 1900s and early 1910s, including those by Ryukichi Endo, Emile Durkheim and Franklin Giddings. The Japan Institute of Sociology was established in 1913 by Tongo Takebe and was replaced by the Japan Sociological Society in 1924. Until World War II, sociology study in Japan was largely influenced by Western theories and in particular the German School.

=== Stage 2: Post-World War II (1946–1960s) ===
The second stage of the development of Japanese sociology was symbolised by a transition of emphasis from philosophical orientations to empirical orientations. The American School of sociology studies cast great influence upon the development of Japanese Sociology during this stage of time.

Social and political reform took place with the US occupation of Japan at the end of WWII. The traditional Japanese value system collapsed and the new idea of democratisation emerged. Sociology came into the public vision with the revision of values. During the 1950s, as part of educational system reform, sociology formally became a required subject of general studies in tertiary education in Japan. An increasing number of sociologists were needed with more sociology departments and progress established. American sociological theories started to gain attention during this fast-developing period of Japanese sociology.

The US occupation helped the spread of American sociological theories in Japan. At that point of time, the American sociologists were particularly emphasizing empirical studies and this ultimately led to the same transition towards empirical research methods in Japanese sociology. Two of the leading Japanese sociologists at that time were Tadashi Fukutake and Kunio Odaka. While they researched in different fields, Fukutake studying in rural sociology and Odaka studying in industrial sociology, they were both leading empirical sociologists conducting a large number of researched-based surveys.

=== Stage 3: Diversification (1960s–1990s) ===
The third stage of development of Japanese Sociology started during the 1960s. This stage of development is characterised by its various emphasis of studies. Both empirical orientation as well as philosophical and theoretical orientation were popular among the Japanese sociologists.

Changes in social structures were witnessed by the senior sociologists during the post-war stage. Yet these senior sociologists mainly belonged to a pre-war academic circle. Younger Japanese sociologists during this period tend to focus more on theoretical micro-sociological analysis than the macro analysis. Multi-dimensional paradigms started to grain attention within Japanese sociology, including those of Alfred Schutz, Anthony Giddens, Jürgen Habermas, and Pierre Bourdieu.

Thus many talented younger sociologists turned from Marxism to structuralism or structuralist social theory ... alternately accepted rather subjective methodologies and theories such as phenomenological sociology, symbolic interactionism and ethnomethodology ...

— Shoji Kokichi, A Preliminary Analysis of the History of Social Sciences in Contemporary Japan (1996)

The American influence and empirical approach continued to develop in Japanese sociology which consequently contributed to the rising of many new and diverse topics of study. This stage saw the emergence of leading scholars including Eiichi Isomura in urban sociology, Kiyomi Morioka in the religion and family sociology, Akira Takahashi in social movements, Joji Watanuki in political sociology, and Tamito Yoshida in social communication. The diversification was later accelerated by other social factors such as industrialisation in the 1970s and environmental and feminist movements in the 1980s.

From this point onwards, sociology in Japan continued to grow at a remarkable rate. By the 1980s, the number of sociologists teaching at colleges reached about 1,000 and the number of members of the Japan Sociological Society increased up to 3,034 in 1999.

=== Stage 4: Globalisation (1990s–present) ===
The fourth stage of development of Japanese sociology began from the 1990s. From then until the present times, there has been a movement toward theoretical and empirical orientations, with increasing international and foreign studies as well as cooperation with global communities.

Research conducted in 1998 by the Japan Sociologist Society examined the preferred field of research of its members. The top 10 preferred fields were:

- 15.6% chose general sociological theories
- 15.2% chose sociology of the family
- 15.1% chose communications and information
- 14.7% chose social thought and the history of sociology
- 14.3% chose social welfare, social security, and medical sociology
- 13.6% chose culture, religion, and morality
- 13.1% chose social psychology and social attitudes
- 12.2% chose rural sociology and community studies
- 11.3% chose cross-national and foreign area studies

The same study was conducted ten years earlier in 1988. The difference in the results obtained showed that industry, labour, and educational problems had lost popularity – whereas communications, information, psychology and foreign studies gained attention during the 1990s. The general trend of globalisation of the nation is responsible for such transition of popular study fields.

While the language barrier and a lack of coordination with foreign research institutions have made the Japanese Sociologists Society lack a reputation in other parts of the world, globalisation has created an increasing number of opportunities for Japanese sociologists to study abroad and welcomed foreign corporations and coordination. Sociology in Japan became more internationalised during this stage of development

== Social problems in Japan ==
In a perfectly harmonious society, sociologists research the patterns and rules of social interactions and relations. However, such studies are not enough in contemporary societies as social problems exists. Research findings are necessarily used to further aid the investigations of existing and emerging social problems.

In 1985, the Japanese Association for The Study of Social Problems was established, and brought increasing attention to the topic. Several major social problems are introduced and explained below.

=== Juvenile crime ===
More concerns have been placed on criminal news reports in recent times in Japan, especially on juvenile crime. In 1997, an incident involving a severed head being hanged on the gate of a junior high school was widely reported in media, attracting attention from the community. It was found to be committed by a 15-year-old boy and the crime shocked Japanese society. Youth bullying has come to the attention of sociologists and juvenile crime has been a social problem.

=== Discrimination ===
The caste system has a significant influence on Japanese history. During the 260 years of Tokugawa period, the caste system ranked the Japanese population according to their occupation with warrior being the highest, followed by peasants, craftsman, and merchants. Outcasts, people with occupation beneath merchants, were deemed to be not respectable in the community. In 1868, the Meiji Revolution established the rule of equality as a social discipline and laws have been created since then. However, although the influence of the caste system has been diminished, discrimination remains and has become a social problem.

=== Suicide ===
From research statistics obtained during 1975–1988, on average about twice the number of deaths in car accidents results from suicide in Japan with the peak number reaching 23,832 deaths in 1987. At that time, however, suicide was not recognised as significant as the car accident deaths. As the social problem of suicide gained increasing attention, sociologists emphasised that suicide cannot be considered alone and apart from law, morality and other social factors. Problems such as depopulation is largely influenced by the issue of suicide.

=== Ageing population ===
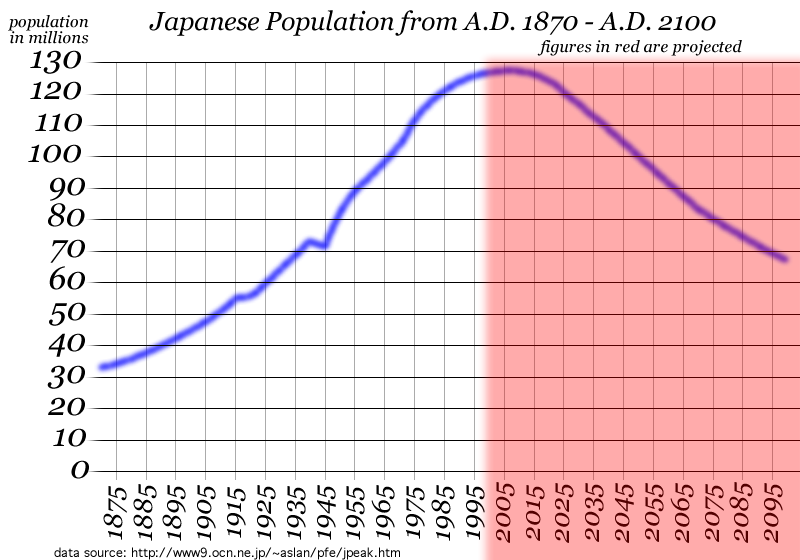
Japanese population chart 1870–2100

The population of Japan is expected to decrease by one-third during the next fifty years with about 40% of the remaining population being over 64 years old, a trend of the aging of Japan. Financial burden and caring responsibilities are increasing for the future working generations. At the same time, a crisis is faced by Japanese universities as the young population shrinks. The number of 18-year-old people was expected to decrease from 2,050,000 in 1992 to 1,200,000 in 2007 and continue downwards. In 2000, sixty percent of the colleges were already unable to recruit enough students. The ageing population situation has created various social problems.
