= History of sociology =

Sociology as a scholarly discipline emerged, primarily out of Enlightenment thought, as a positivist science of society shortly after the French Revolution. Its genesis owed to various key movements in the philosophy of science and the philosophy of knowledge, arising in reaction to such issues as modernity, capitalism, urbanization, rationalization, secularization, colonization and imperialism.

During its nascent stages, within the late 19th century, sociological deliberations took particular interest in the emergence of the modern nation state, including its constituent institutions, units of socialization, and its means of surveillance. As such, an emphasis on the concept of modernity, rather than the Enlightenment, often distinguishes sociological discourse from that of classical political philosophy. Likewise, social analysis in a broader sense has origins in the common stock of philosophy, therefore pre-dating the sociological field.

Various quantitative social research techniques have become common tools for governments, businesses, and organizations, and have also found use in the other social sciences. Divorced from theoretical explanations of social dynamics, this has given social research a degree of autonomy from the discipline of sociology. Similarly, "social science" has come to be appropriated as an umbrella term to refer to various disciplines which study humans, interaction, society or culture.

As a discipline, sociology encompasses a varying scope of conception based on each sociologist's understanding of the nature and scope of society and its constituents. Creating a merely linear definition of its science would be improper in rationalizing the aims and efforts of sociological study from different academic backgrounds.

== Antecedent history ==
=== Scope of being "sociological" ===
The codification of sociology as a word, concept, and popular terminology is identified with Emmanuel Joseph Sieyès (see 18th century section) and succeeding figures from that point onward. It is important to be mindful of presentism, of introducing ideas of the present into the past, around sociology. Below, we see figures that developed strong methods and critiques that reflect on what we know sociology to be today that situates them as important figures in knowledge development around sociology. However, the term of "sociology" did not exist in this period, requiring careful language to incorporate these earlier efforts into the wider history of sociology. A more apt term to use might be proto-sociology that outlines that the rough ingredients of sociology were present, but had no defined shape or label to understand them as sociology as we concepualize it today.

=== Ancient Greeks ===
Sociological reasoning may be traced back at least as far as the ancient Greeks, (Note: cf. Xenophanes′ remark: "if horses would adore gods, these gods would resemble horses.") whose characteristic trends in sociological thought can be traced back to their social environment. Given the rarity of extensive or highly-centralized political organization within states, the tribal spirit of localism and provincialism was in open season for deliberations on social phenomena, which would thus pervade much of Greek thought.

Proto-sociological observations can be seen in the founding texts of Western philosophy (e.g. Herodotus, Thucydides, Plato, Polybius, etc.). Similarly, the methodological survey can trace its origins back to the Domesday Book ordered by King of England, William the Conqueror, in 1086.

=== 13th century: studying social patterns ===
==== East Asia ====
Sociological perspectives can also be found among non-European thought of figures such as Confucius.

In the 13th century, Ma Duanlin, a Chinese historian, first recognized patterns of social dynamics as an underlying component of historical development in his seminal encyclopedia, Wénxiàn Tōngkǎo (文献通考; 'General Study of Literary Remains').

=== 14th century: early studies of social conflict and change ===
==== North Africa ====
There is evidence of early Muslim sociology from the 14th century. In particular, some consider Islamic scholar Ibn Khaldun, a 14th-century Arab from Tunisia, to have been the first sociologist and, thus, the father of sociology. His Muqaddimah (later translated as Prolegomena in Latin), serving as an introduction to a seven-volume analysis of universal history, would perhaps be the first work to advance social-scientific reasoning and social philosophy in formulating theories of social cohesion and social conflict.

Concerning the discipline of sociology, Ibn Khaldun conceived a dynamic theory of history that involved conceptualizations of social conflict and social change. He developed the dichotomy of sedentary life versus nomadic life, as well as the concept of generation, and the inevitable loss of power that occurs when desert warriors conquer a city. Following his Syrian contemporary, Sati' al-Husri, the Muqaddimah may be read as a sociological work; six books of general sociology, to be specific. Topics dealt with in this work include politics, urban life, economics, and knowledge.

The work is based around Khaldun's central concept of asabiyyah, meaning "social cohesion", "group solidarity", or "tribalism". Khaldun suggests such cohesion arises spontaneously amongst tribes and other small kinship groups, which can then be intensified and enlarged through religious ideology. Khaldun's analysis observes how this cohesion carries groups to power while simultaneously containing within itself the—psychological, sociological, economic, political—seeds of the group's downfall, to be replaced by a new group, dynasty, or empire bound by an even stronger (or at least younger and more vigorous) cohesion.

== 18th century: European modern origins of sociology ==
French politician and philosopher Louis de Bonald (2 October 1754 – 23 November 1840) formulated a theoretical framework that would give rise to French sociology. The term "sociologie" was first coined by the French Roman Catholic priest and essayist Emmanuel Joseph Sieyès (1773–1799), derived the Latin socius, 'companion'; joined with the suffix -ology, 'the study of', itself from the Greek lógos (λόγος, 'knowledge').

== 19th century: defining sociology ==
In 1838, the French scholar Auguste Comte ultimately gave sociology the definition that it holds today. Comte had earlier expressed his work as "social physics", however that term would be appropriated by others such as Belgian statistician Adolphe Quetelet.

=== European sociology: The Enlightenment and positivism ===
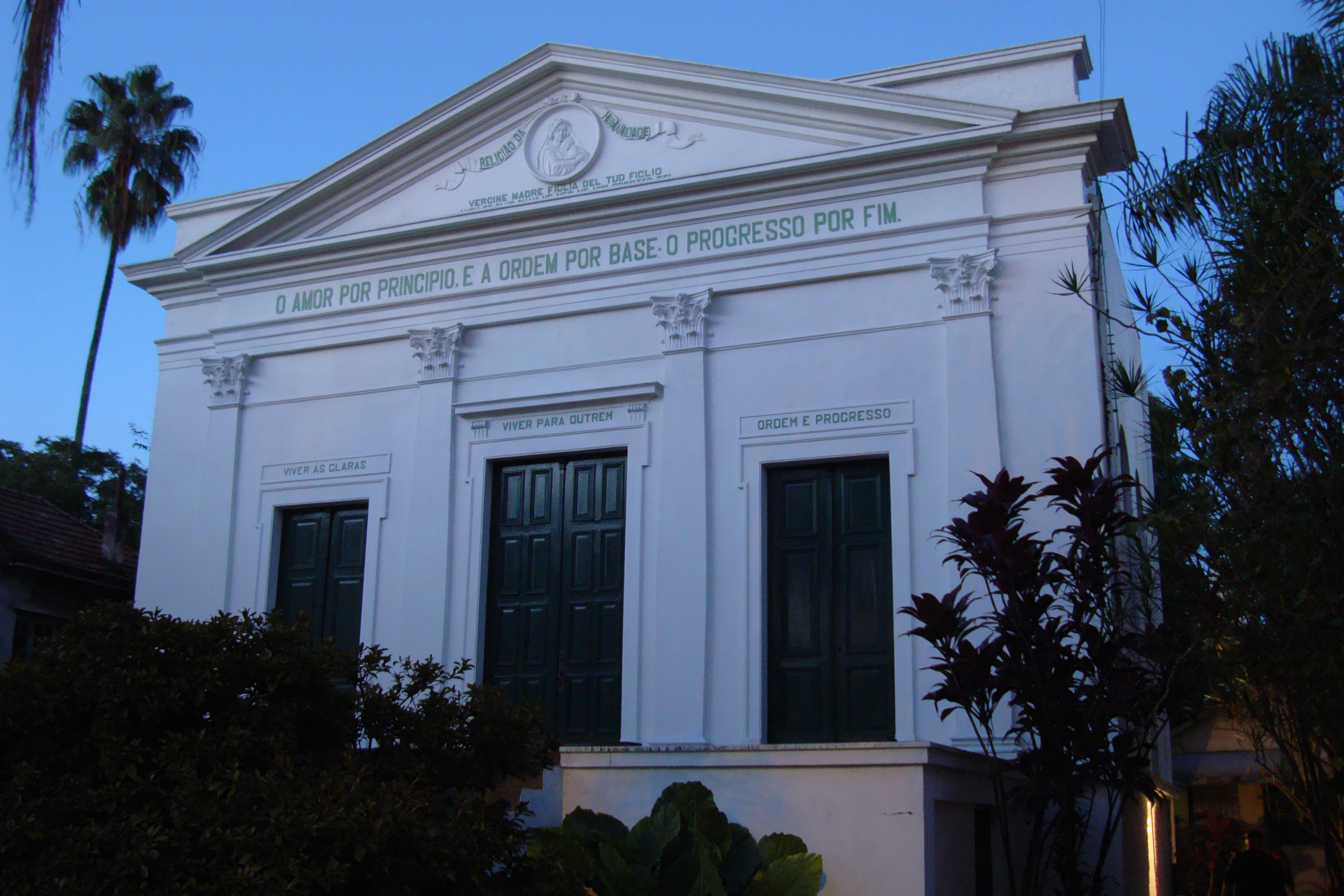
The Positivist temple in Porto Alegre

==== Henri de Saint-Simon ====
Henri de Saint-Simon published Physiologie sociale in 1813, devoting much of his time to the prospect that human society could be steered toward progress if scientists would form an international assembly to influence its course. He argued that scientists could distract groups from war and strife, by focusing their attention to generally improving their societies living conditions. In turn, this would bring multiple cultures and societies together and prevent conflict. Saint-Simon took the idea that everyone had encouraged from the Enlightenment, which was the belief in science, and spun it to be more practical and hands-on for the society.

Saint-Simon's main idea was that industrialism would create a new launch in history. He saw that people had been seeing progress as an approach for science, but he wanted them to see it as an approach to all aspects of life. Society was making a crucial change at the time since it was growing out of a declining feudalism. This new path could provide the basis for solving all the old problems society had previously encountered. He was more concerned with the participation of man in the workforce instead of which workforce man choose. His slogan became "All men must work", to which communism would add and supply its own slogan "Each according to his capacity."

==== Auguste Comte and followers ====
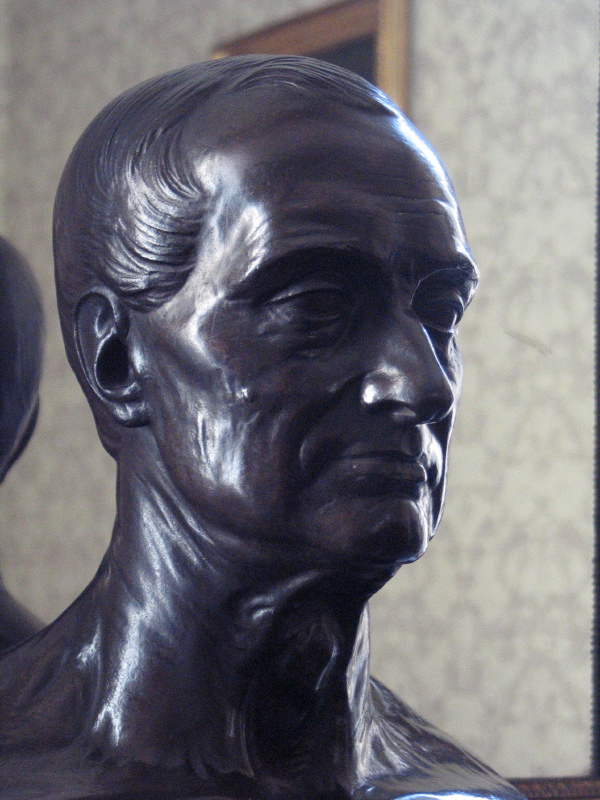
Auguste Comte

Writing after the original Enlightenment and influenced by the work of Saint-Simon, political philosopher of social contract, Auguste Comte hoped to unify all studies of humankind through the scientific understanding of the social realm. His own sociological scheme was typical of the 19th-century humanists; he believed all human life passed through distinct historical stages and that, if one could grasp this progress, one could prescribe the remedies for social ills. Sociology was to be the "queen science" in Comte's schema; all basic physical sciences had to arrive first, leading to the most fundamentally difficult science of human society itself. Comte has thus come to be viewed as the "Father of Sociology".

Comte delineated his broader philosophy of science in the Course of Positive Philosophy (c. 1830–1842), whereas his A General View of Positivism (1848) emphasized the particular goals of sociology. Comte would be so impressed with his theory of positivism that he referred to it as "the great discovery of the year 1822."

Comte's system is based on the principles of knowledge as seen in three states. This law asserts that any kind of knowledge always begins in theological form. Here, the knowledge can be explained by a superior supernatural power such as animism, spirits, or gods. It then passes to the metaphysical form, where the knowledge is explained by abstract philosophical speculation. Finally, the knowledge becomes positive after being explained scientifically through observation, experimentation, and comparison. The order of the laws was created in order of increasing difficulty. Comte's description of the development of society is parallel to Karl Marx's own theory of historiography from capitalism to communism. The two would both be influenced by various Utopian-socialist thinkers of the day, agreeing that some form of communism would be the climax of societal development.

In later life, Auguste Comte developed a "religion of humanity" to give positivist societies the unity and cohesiveness found through the traditional worship people were used to. In this new "religion", Comte referred to society as the "Great Being" and would promote a universal love and harmony taught through the teachings of his industrial system theory. For his close associate, John Stuart Mill, it was possible to distinguish between a "good Comte" (the one who wrote Course in Positive Philosophy) and a "bad Comte" (the author of the secular-religious system). The system would be unsuccessful but met with the publication of Darwin's On the Origin of Species to influence the proliferation of various secular humanist organizations in the 19th century, especially through the work of secularists such as George Holyoake and Richard Congreve.

Harriet Martineau undertook an English translation of Cours de Philosophie Positive that was published in two volumes in 1853 as The Positive Philosophy of Auguste Comte (freely translated and condensed by Harriet Martineau). Comte recommended her volumes to his students instead of his own. Some writers regard Martineau as the first female sociologist. Her introduction of Comte to the English-speaking world and the elements of sociological perspective in her original writings support her credit as a sociologist.

==== Marx and historical materialism ====
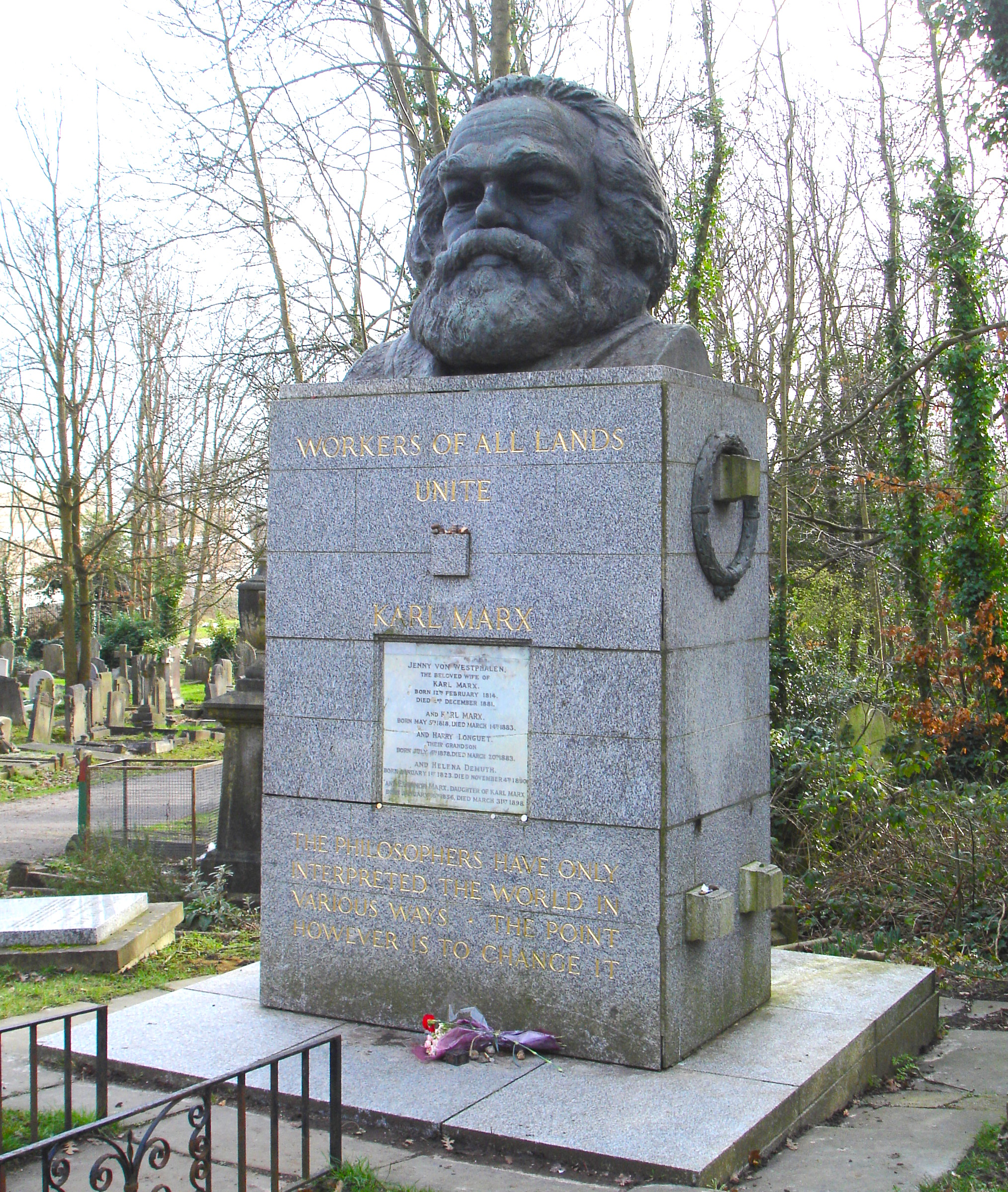
Karl Marx rejected the positivist sociology of Comte but was of central influence in founding structural social science.

Both Comte and Marx intended to develop a new scientific ideology in the wake of European secularization. Marx, in the tradition of Hegelianism, rejected the positivist method and was in turn rejected by the self-proclaimed sociologists of his day. However, in attempting to develop a comprehensive science of society Marx nevertheless became recognized as a founder of sociology by the mid 20th century. Isaiah Berlin described Marx as the "true father" of modern sociology, "in so far as anyone can claim the title."

To have given clear and unified answers in familiar empirical terms to those theoretical questions which most occupied men's minds at the time, and to have deduced from them clear practical directives without creating obviously artificial links between the two, was the principal achievement of Marx's theory.… The sociological treatment of historical and moral problems, which Comte and after him, Spencer and Taine, had discussed and mapped, became a precise and concrete study only when the attack of militant Marxism made its conclusions a burning issue, and so made the search for evidence more zealous and the attention to method more intense.

— Isaiah Berlin, Karl Marx (1967), pp. 13–14, 130

In the 1830s, Karl Marx was part of the Young Hegelians in Berlin, which discussed and wrote about the legacy of the philosopher, George W. F. Hegel (whose seminal tome, Science of Logic was published in 1816). Although, at first sympathetic with the group's strategy of attacking Christianity to undermine the Prussian establishment, he later formed divergent ideas and broke with the Young Hegelians, attacking their views in works such as The German Ideology. Witnessing the struggles of the laborers during the Industrial Revolution, Marx concluded that religion (or the "ideal") is not the basis of the establishment's power, but rather ownership of capital (or the "material")- processes that employ technologies, land, money and especially human labor-power to create surplus-value—lie at the heart of the establishment's power. This "stood Hegel on his head" as he theorized that, at its core, the engine of history and the structure of society was fundamentally material rather than ideal. He theorized that both the realm of cultural production and political power created ideologies that perpetuated the oppression of the working class and the concentration of wealth within the capitalist class: the owners of the means of production. Marx predicted that the capitalist class would feel compelled to reduce wages or replace laborers with technology, which would ultimately increase wealth among the capitalists. However, as the workers were also the primary consumers of the goods produced, reducing their wages would result in an inevitable collapse in capitalism as a mode of economic production.

Marx also co-operated with Friedrich Engels, who accused the capitalist class of "social murder" for causing workers "life of toil and wretchedness" but with a response that "tales no further trouble in the matter". This gives them the power over the workers' health and income, "which can degree his life or death". His book The Condition of the Working Class in England (1844) studied the life of the proletariat in Manchester, London, Dublin, and Edinburgh.

==== Durkheim and French sociology ====
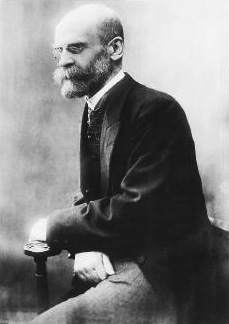
Émile Durkheim

Émile Durkheim's work had importance as he was concerned with how societies could maintain their integrity and coherence in modernity, an era in which traditional social and religious ties are no longer assumed, and in which new social institutions have come into being. Durkheim's first major sociological work was The Division of Labour in Society (1893). In 1895, he published The Rules of Sociological Method and set up the first European department of sociology at what became in 1896 the University of Bordeaux, where he taught from 1887 to 1902; he became France's first professor of sociology. In 1898, he established the journal L'Année Sociologique. Durkheim's seminal monograph, Suicide (1897), a study of suicide rates in Catholic and Protestant populations, pioneered modern social research and served to distinguish social science from psychology and political philosophy. The Elementary Forms of the Religious Life (1912) presented a theory of religion, comparing the social and cultural lives of aboriginal and modern societies. Durkheim was deeply preoccupied with the acceptance of sociology as a legitimate science. He refined the positivism originally set forth by Auguste Comte, promoting what could be considered as a form of epistemological realism, as well as the use of the hypothetico-deductive model in social science. For him, sociology was the science of institutions, if this term is understood in its broader meaning as "beliefs and modes of behaviour instituted by the collectivity" and its aim was to discover structural social facts. Durkheim was a major proponent of structural functionalism, a foundational perspective in both sociology and anthropology. In his view, social science should be purely holistic; (Note: "The first and most fundamental rule is: Consider social facts as things." Durkheim, Emile. 1895. The Rules of Sociological Method. p. 14.) that is, sociology should study phenomena attributed to society at large, rather than being limited to the specific actions of individuals. He remained a dominant force in French intellectual life until his death in 1917, presenting numerous lectures and published works on a variety of topics, including the sociology of knowledge, morality, social stratification, religion, law, education, and deviance. Durkheimian terms such as "collective consciousness" have since entered the popular lexicon.

==== German sociology: Tönnies, the Webers, Simmel ====
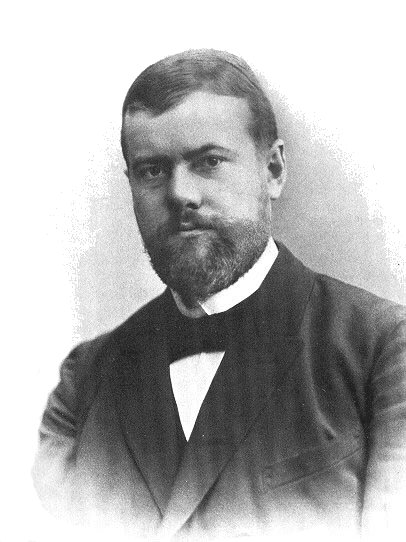
Max Weber, German sociologist of modernization and organization

Ferdinand Tönnies argued that Gemeinschaft and Gesellschaft were the two normal types of human association. The former was the traditional kind of community with strong social bonds and shared beliefs, while the latter was the modern society in which individualism and rationality had become more dominant. He also drew a sharp line between the realm of conceptuality and the reality of social action: the first must be treated axiomatically and in a deductive way ('pure' sociology), whereas the second empirically and in an inductive way ('applied' sociology). His ideas were further developed by Max Weber, another early German sociologist.

Weber argued for the study of social action through interpretive (rather than purely empiricist) means, based on understanding the purpose and meaning that individuals attach to their own actions. Unlike Durkheim, he did not believe in monocausal explanations and rather proposed that for any outcome there can be multiple causes. Weber's main intellectual concern was understanding the processes of rationalisation, secularisation, and "disenchantment", which he associated with the rise of capitalism and modernity. Weber is also known for his thesis combining economic sociology and the sociology of religion, elaborated in his book The Protestant Ethic and the Spirit of Capitalism, in which he proposed that ascetic Protestantism was one of the major "elective affinities" associated with the rise in the Western world of market-driven capitalism and the rational-legal nation-state. He argued that it was in the basic tenets of Protestantism to boost capitalism. Thus, it can be said that the spirit of capitalism is inherent to Protestant religious values. Against Marx's historical materialism, Weber emphasised the importance of cultural influences embedded in religion as a means for understanding the genesis of capitalism. (Note: Weber's references to "Superstructure" and "base" on pages 19 and 35 are unambiguous references to Marxism's base/superstructure theory. (The Protestant Ethic 1905).) The Protestant Ethic formed the earliest part in Weber's broader investigations into world religion. In another major work, "Politics as a Vocation", Weber defined the state as an entity that successfully claims a "monopoly of the legitimate use of physical force within a given territory". He was also the first to categorise social authority into distinct forms, which he labelled as charismatic, traditional, and rational-legal. His analysis of bureaucracy emphasised that modern state institutions are increasingly based on rational-legal authority.

Weber´s wife, Marianne Weber also became a sociologist in her own right writing about women´s issues. She wrote Wife and Mother in the Development of Law which was devoted to the analysis of the institution of marriage. Her conclusion was that marriage is "a complex and ongoing negotiation over power and intimacy, in which money, women's work, and sexuality are key issues". Another theme in her work was that women's work could be used to "map and explain the construction and reproduction of the social person and the social world". Human work creates cultural products ranging from small, daily values such as cleanliness and honesty to larger, more abstract phenomena like philosophy and language.

Georg Simmel was one of the first generation of German sociologists: his neo-Kantian approach laid the foundations for sociological antipositivism, asking 'What is society?' in a direct allusion to Kant's question 'What is nature?', presenting pioneering analyses of social individuality and fragmentation. For Simmel, culture referred to "the cultivation of individuals through the agency of external forms which have been objectified in the course of history". Simmel discussed social and cultural phenomena in terms of "forms" and "contents" with a transient relationship; form becoming content, and vice versa, dependent on the context. In this sense he was a forerunner to structuralist styles of reasoning in the social sciences. With his work on the metropolis, Simmel was a precursor of urban sociology, symbolic interactionism and social network analysis. Simmel's most famous works today are The Problems of the Philosophy of History (1892), The Philosophy of Money (1900), The Metropolis and Mental Life (1903), Soziologie (1908, inc. The Stranger, The Social Boundary, The Sociology of the Senses, The Sociology of Space, and On The Spatial Projections of Social Forms), and Fundamental Questions of Sociology (1917).

==== Herbert Spencer ====
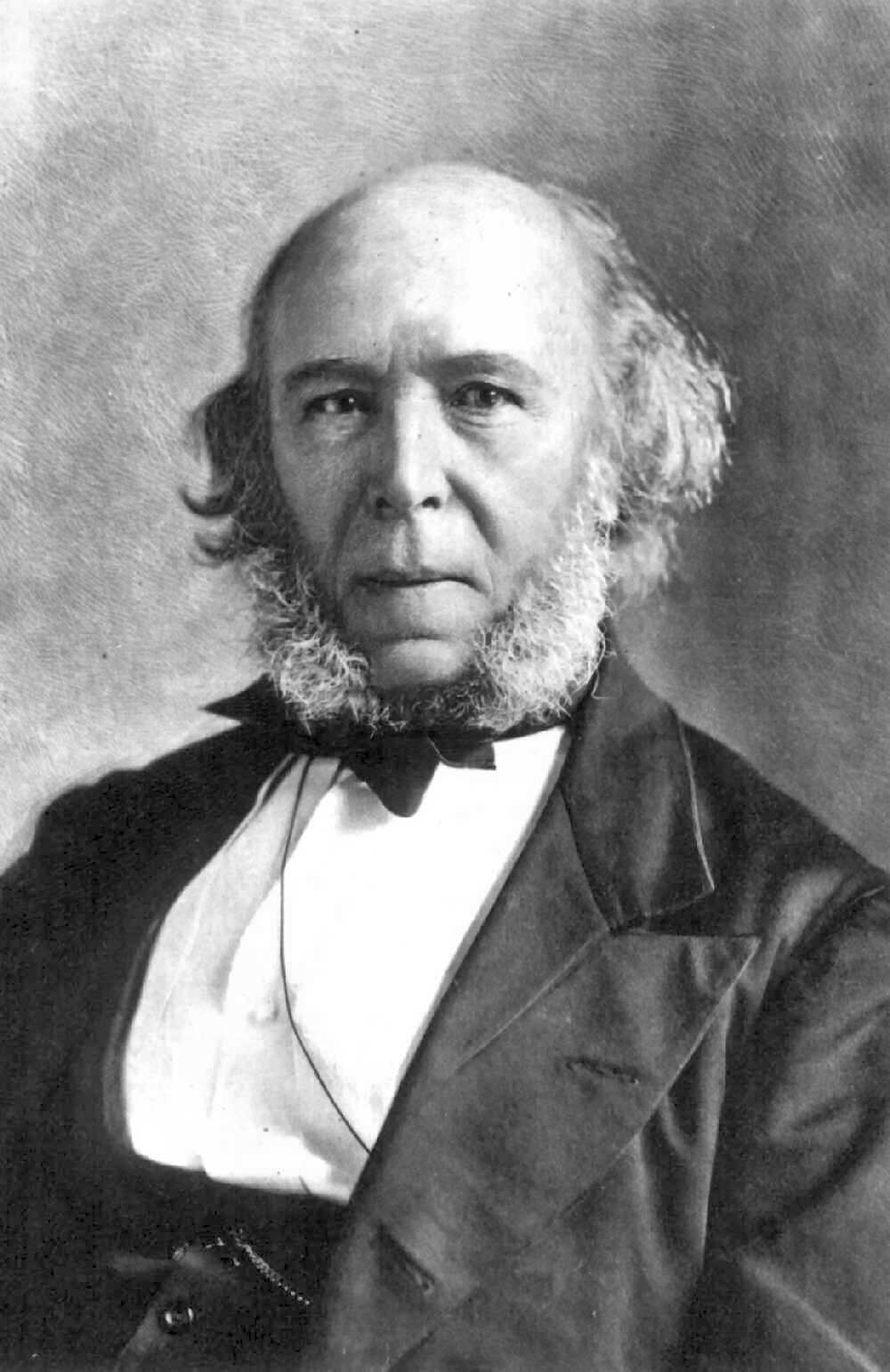
Herbert Spencer

Herbert Spencer (1820–1903), the English philosopher, was one of the most popular and influential 19th-century sociologists, although his work has largely fallen out of favor in contemporary sociology. The early sociology of Spencer came about broadly as a reaction to Comte and Marx; writing before and after the Darwinian revolution in biology, Spencer attempted to reformulate the discipline in socially Darwinistic terms. In fact, his early writings show a coherent theory of general evolution several years before Darwin published anything on the subject.

Encouraged by his friend and follower Edward L. Youmans, Spencer published The Study of Sociology in 1874, which was the first book with the term "sociology" in the title. It is estimated that he sold one million books in his lifetime, far more than any other sociologist at the time. So strong was his influence that many other 19th-century thinkers, including Émile Durkheim, defined their ideas in relation to his. Durkheim's Division of Labour in Society is to a large extent an extended debate with Spencer from whose sociology Durkheim borrowed extensively. Also a notable biologist, Spencer coined the term "survival of the fittest" as a basic mechanism by which more effective socio-cultural forms progressed. This means that the strongest members of society should not help the weaker members of society. An example is that the richest should remain rich and the poor should also remain poor, as the rich people would not help the poor.

In the 20th century, Spencer's work became less influential in sociology because of his social Darwinist views on race, which are widely considered a form of scientific racism. For example, in his Social Statics (1850), he argued that imperialism had served civilization by clearing the inferior races off the earth: "The forces which are working out the great scheme of perfect happiness, taking no account of incidental suffering, exterminate such sections of mankind as stand in their way. … Be he human or be he brute – the hindrance must be got rid of." Largely because of his work on race, Spencer is now described in the academy as "of all the great Victorian thinkers... [the one] whose reputation has fallen the farthest."

=== North American sociology ===
==== Lester Frank Ward ====
A contemporary of Spencer, Lester Frank Ward is often described as a father of American sociology and served as the first president of the American Sociological Association in 1905 and served as such until 1907. He published Dynamic Sociology in 1883; Outlines of Sociology in 1898; Pure Sociology in 1903; and Applied Sociology in 1906. Also in 1906, at the age of 65 he was appointed as professor of sociology at Brown University.

==== W. E. B. Du Bois ====
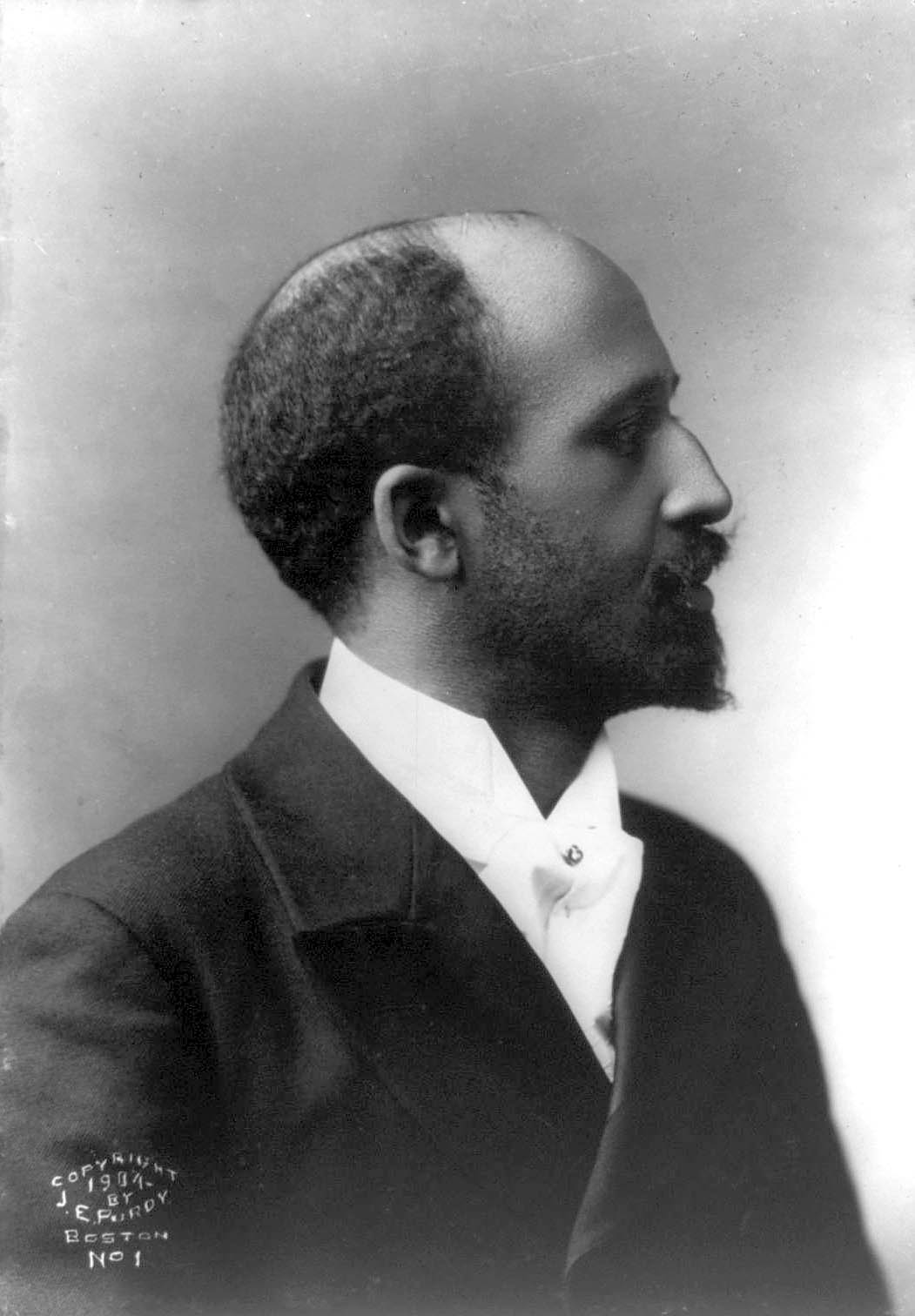
W. E. B. Du Bois, pioneering American sociologist of race

In July 1897, W. E. B. Du Bois produced his first major The Philadelphia Negro (1899), a detailed and comprehensive sociological study of the African-American people of Philadelphia, based on the field work he did in 1896–1897. The work was a breakthrough in scholarship because it was the first scientific study of African Americans and a significant contribution to early scientific sociology in the U.S. (Note: "The Philadelphia Negro stands as a classic in (urban) sociology and African American studies because it was the first scientific study of the Negro and the first scientific sociological study in the United States." Donaldson, Shawn. 2001. "The Philadelphia Negro." Pp. 164–65 in W.E.B. Du Bois: An Encyclopedia, edited by G. Horne and M. Young. Westport: Greenwood Press. p. 165.) (Note: "The pioneering studies of African cultures and Afro-American realities and history initiated by W. E. B. Du Bois from 1894 until 1915 stand not only as the first studies of black people on a firm scientific basis altogether – whether classified among the social or historical sciences – but they also represent the earliest ethnographies of Afro-America as well as a major contribution to the earliest corpus of social scientific literature from the United States." (Lange 1983).) In the study, Du Bois coined the phrase "the submerged tenth" to describe the black underclass. Later in 1903 he popularized the term, the "Talented Tenth", applied to society's elite class. Du Bois's terminology reflected his opinion that the elite of a nation, both black and white, were critical to achievements in culture and progress. To portray the genius and humanity of the black race, Du Bois published The Souls of Black Folk (1903), a collection of 14 essays. The introduction famously proclaimed that "the problem of the Twentieth Century is the problem of the color line." A major theme of the work was the double consciousness faced by African Americans: being both American and black. This was a unique identity which, according to Du Bois, had been a handicap in the past, but could be a strength in the future, "Henceforth, the destiny of the race could be conceived as leading neither to assimilation nor separatism but to proud, enduring hyphenation."

=== Other precursors ===
Many other philosophers and academics were influential in the development of sociology, not least the Enlightenment theorists of social contract, and historians such as Adam Ferguson (1723–1816). For his theory on social interaction, Ferguson has himself been described as "the father" of modern sociology. Ferguson argued that capitalism was diminishing social bonds that traditionally held communities together. Other early works to appropriate the term 'sociology' included A Treatise on Sociology, Theoretical and Practical by the North American lawyer Henry Hughes and Sociology for the South, or the Failure of Free Society by the American lawyer George Fitzhugh. Both books were published in 1854, in the context of the debate over slavery in the antebellum US. Harriet Martineau, a Whig social theorist and the English translator of many of Comte's works, has been cited as the first female sociologist. Writing a study of the United States, she noted how the theoretical ideal of equality apparent in the Declaration of Independence were not reflected in the social reality of the country, which marginalised women and practiced slavery.

Various other early social historians and economists have gained recognition as classical sociologists, including Robert Michels (1876–1936), Alexis de Tocqueville (1805–1859), Vilfredo Pareto (1848–1923) and Thorstein Veblen (1857–1926). The classical sociological texts broadly differ from political philosophy in the attempt to remain scientific, systematic, structural, or dialectical, rather than purely moral, normative or subjective. The new class relations associated with the development of Capitalism are also key, further distinguishing sociological texts from the political philosophy of the Renaissance and Enlightenment eras.

== 19th century: institutionalization ==
=== Rise as an academic discipline ===
==== Europe ====
Formal institutionalization of sociology as an academic discipline began when Emile Durkheim founded the first French department of sociology at the University of Bordeaux in 1895. In 1896, he established the journal L'Année Sociologique.

A course entitled "sociology" was taught for the first time in the United States in 1875 by William Graham Sumner, drawing upon the thought of Comte and Herbert Spencer rather than the work of Durkheim. In 1890, the oldest continuing sociology course in the United States began at the University of Kansas, lectured by Frank Blackmar. The Department of History and Sociology at the University of Kansas was established in 1891 and the first full-fledged independent university department of sociology was established in 1892 at the University of Chicago by Albion W. Small (1854–1926), who in 1895 founded the American Journal of Sociology. American sociology arose on a broadly independent trajectory to European sociology. George Herbert Mead and Charles H. Cooley were influential in the development of symbolic interactionism and social psychology at the University of Chicago, while Lester Ward emphasized the central importance of the scientific method with the publication of Dynamic Sociology in 1883.

The first sociology department in the United Kingdom was founded at the London School of Economics in 1904. In 1919 a sociology department was established in Germany at LMU Munich by Max Weber, who had established a new antipositivist sociology. The "Institute for Social Research" at the University of Frankfurt (later to become the "Frankfurt School" of critical theory) was founded in 1923.[29] Critical theory would take on something of a life of its own after WW2, influencing literary theory and the "Birmingham School" of cultural studies.

The University of Frankfurt's advances along with the proximity to the research institute for sociology made Germany a powerful force in leading sociology at that time. In 1918, Frankfurt received the funding to create sociology's first department chair. The Germany's groundbreaking work influenced its government to add the position of Minister of Culture to advance the country as a whole. The remarkable collection of men who were contributing to the sociology department at Frankfurt were soon getting worldwide attention and began being referred to as the "Frankfurt school." Here they studied new perspectives on Marx' theories, and went into depth in the works of Weber and Freud. Most of these men would soon be forced out of Germany by the Nazis, moving to America. In the United States they had a significant influence on social research. This forced relocation of sociologists enabled sociology in America to rise up to the standards of European studies of sociology by planting some of Europe's greatest sociologists in America.

Felix Weil was one of the students who received their doctorate on the concept of socialization from the University of Frankfurt. He, along with Max Horkheimer and Kurt Albert Gerlach, developed the Institute of Social Research after it was established in 1923. Kurt Albert Gerlach would serve as the institute's first director. Their goal in creating the institute was to produce a place that people could discover and be informed of social life as a whole. Weil, Horkheimer, and Gerlach wanted to focus on interactions between economics, politics, legal matters, as well as scholarly interactions in the community and society. The main research that got the institute known was its revival of scientific Marxism. Many benefactors contributed money, supplies, and buildings to keep this area of research going. When Gerlach became ill and had to step down as director, Max Horkheimer took his place. He encouraged the students of the institute to question everything they studied. If the students studied a theory, he not only wanted them to discover its truth themselves, but also to discover how, and why it is true and the theories relation to society. The National Socialist regime exiled many of the members of the Institute of Social Research. The regime also forced many students and staff from the entire Frankfurt University, and most fled to America. The war meant that the institute lost too many people and was forced to close. In 1950, the institute was reopened as a private establishment. From this point on the Institute of Social Research would have a close connection to sociology studies in the United States.

==== North America ====
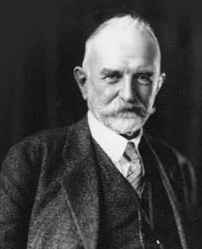
George Herbert Mead, one of the most influential early American sociologists

In 1905 the American Sociological Association, the world's largest association of professional sociologists, was founded, and Lester F. Ward was selected to serve as the first President of the new society.

The University of Chicago developed the major sociologists at the time. It brought them together, and even gave them a hub and a network to link all the leading sociologists. In 1925, a third of all sociology graduate students attended the University of Chicago. Chicago was very good at not isolating their students from other schools. They encouraged them to blend with other sociologists, and to not spend more time in the class room than studying the society around them. This would teach them real life application of the classroom teachings. The first teachings at the University of Chicago were focused on the social problems that the world had been dealt. At this time, academia was not concerned with theory; especially not to the point that academia is today. Many people were still hesitant of sociology at this time, especially with the recent controversial theories of Weber and Marx. The University of Chicago decided to go into an entirely different direction and their sociology department directed their attention to the individual and promoted equal rights. Their concentration was small groups and discoveries of the individual's relationship to society. The program combined with other departments to offer students well-rounded studies requiring courses in hegemony, economics, psychology, multiple social sciences and political science. Albion Small was the head of the sociology program at the University of Chicago. He played a key role in bringing German sociological advancements directly into American academic sociology. Small also created the American Journal of Sociology. Robert Park and Ernest Burgess refined the program's methods, guidelines, and checkpoints. This made the findings more standardized, concise and easier to comprehend. The pair even wrote the sociology program's textbook for a reference and get all students on the same page more effectively. Many remarkable sociologists such as George Hebert Mead, W.E.B. Du Bois, Robert Park, Charles S. Johnson, William Ogburn, Hebert Blumer and many others have significant ties to the University of Chicago.

In 1920 a department was set up in Poland by Florian Znaniecki (1882–1958). William I. Thomas was an early graduate from the Sociology Department of the University of Chicago. He built upon his education and his work changed sociology in many ways. In 1918, William I. Thomas and Florian Znaniecki gave the world the publication of "The Polish Peasant" in Europe and America. This publication combined sociological theory with in depth experiential research and thus launching methodical sociological research as a whole. This changed sociologist's methods and enabled them to see new patterns and connect new theories. This publication also gave sociologists a new way to found their research and prove it on a new level. All their research would be more solid, and harder for society to not pay attention to it. In 1920, Znaniecki developed a sociology department in Poland to expand research and teachings there.

With the lack of sociological theory being taught at the University of Chicago paired with the new foundations of statistical methods, the student's ability to make any real predictions was nonexistent. This was a major factor in the downfall of the Chicago school.

==== International ====
International cooperation in sociology began in 1893 when René Worms (1869–1926) founded the small Institut International de Sociologie, eclipsed by much larger International Sociological Association from 1949.

=== Canonization of Durkheim, Marx and Weber ===
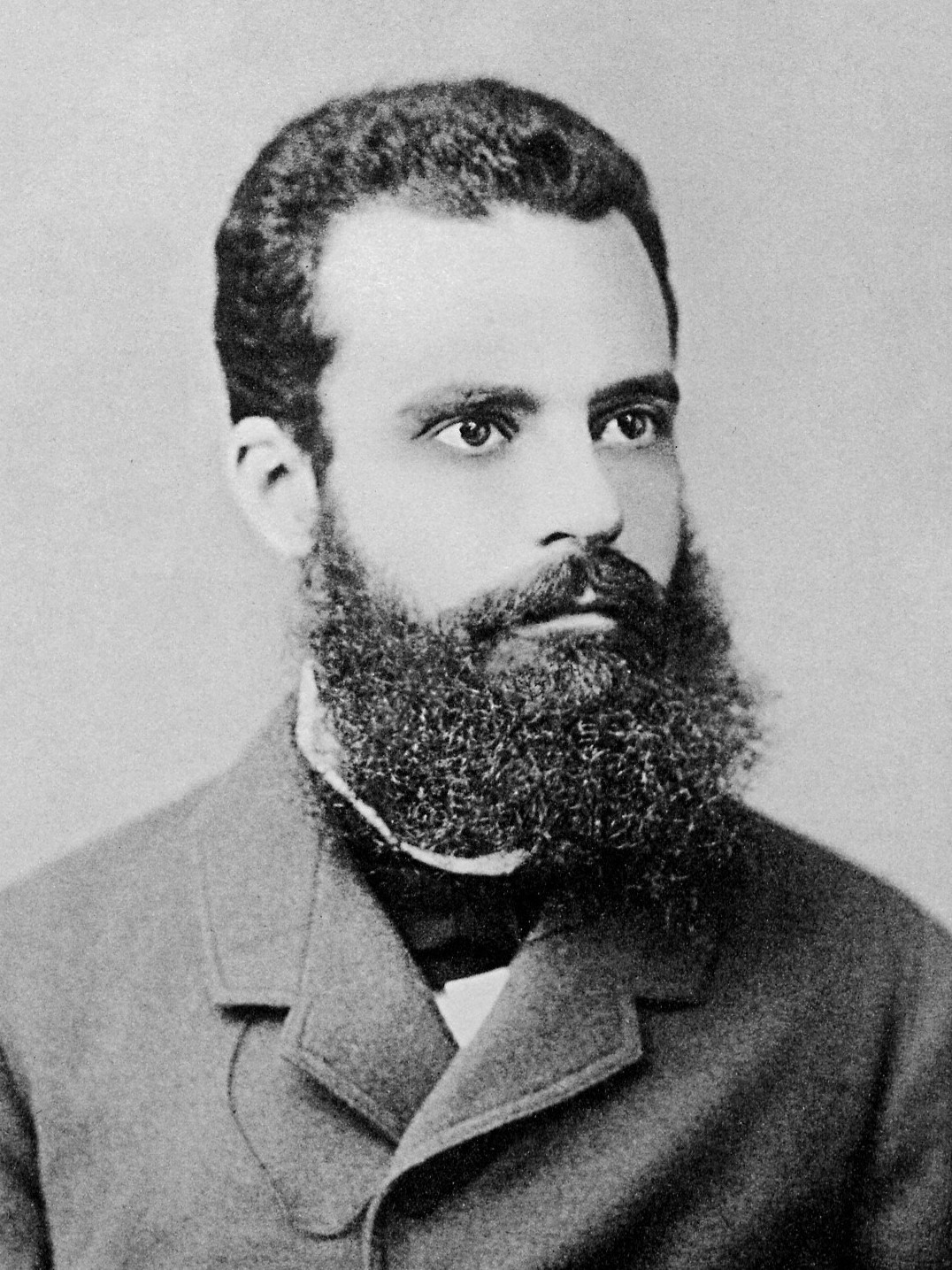
Vilfredo Pareto

Durkheim, Marx, and Weber are typically cited as the three principal architects of modern social science. The sociological "canon of classics" with Durkheim and Weber at the top owes in part to Talcott Parsons, who is largely credited with introducing both to American audiences. Parsons' Structure of Social Action (1937) consolidated the American sociological tradition and set the agenda for American sociology at the point of its fastest disciplinary growth. In Parsons' canon, however, Vilfredo Pareto holds greater significance than either Marx or Simmel. His canon was guided by a desire to "unify the divergent theoretical traditions in sociology behind a single theoretical scheme, one that could in fact be justified by purely scientific developments in the discipline during the previous half century." While the secondary role Marx plays in early American sociology may be attributed to Parsons, as well as to broader political trends, the dominance of Marxism in European sociological thought had long since secured the rank of Marx alongside Durkheim and Weber as one of the three "classical" sociologists.

== 19th century: from positivism to anti-positivism ==
The methodological approach toward sociology by early theorists was to treat the discipline in broadly the same manner as natural science. An emphasis on empiricism and the scientific method was sought to provide an incontestable foundation for any sociological claims or findings, and to distinguish sociology from less empirical fields such as philosophy. This perspective, termed positivism, was first developed by theorist Auguste Comte. Positivism was founded on the theory that the only true, factual knowledge is scientific knowledge. Comte had very vigorous guidelines for a theory to be considered positivism. He thought that this authentic knowledge can only be derived from positive confirmation of theories through strict continuously tested methods, that are not only scientifically but also quantitatively based. Émile Durkheim was a major proponent of theoretically grounded empirical research, seeking correlations to reveal structural laws, or "social facts". Durkheim proved that concepts that had been attributed to the individual were actually socially determined. These occurrences are things such as suicide, crime, moral outrage, a person's personality, time, space, and God. He brought to light that society had influence on all aspects of a person, far more than had been previously believed. For him, sociology could be described as the "science of institutions, their genesis and their functioning". Durkheim endeavoured to apply sociological findings in the pursuit of political reform and social solidarity. Today, scholarly accounts of Durkheim's positivism may be vulnerable to exaggeration and oversimplification: Comte was the only major sociological thinker to postulate that the social realm may be subject to scientific analysis in the same way as noble science, whereas Durkheim acknowledged in greater detail the fundamental epistemological limitations.

Reactions against positivism began when German philosopher Georg Wilhelm Friedrich Hegel (1770–1831) voiced opposition to both empiricism, which he rejected as uncritical, and determinism, which he viewed as overly mechanistic. Karl Marx's methodology borrowed from Hegel dialecticism but also a rejection of positivism in favour of critical analysis, seeking to supplement the empirical acquisition of "facts" with the elimination of illusions. He maintained that appearances need to be critiqued rather than simply documented. Marx nonetheless endeavoured to produce a science of society grounded in the economic determinism of historical materialism. Other philosophers, including Wilhelm Dilthey (1833–1911) and Heinrich Rickert (1863–1936) argued that the natural world differs from the social world because of those unique aspects of human society (meanings, signs, and so on) which inform human cultures.

In Italy, speculative knowledge prevails over positivistic sociological science, where the forms of attraction of the social sciences are vitiated by the self-reformism of morality and the self-assertion of science. The process lasts until the 1950s. After that there is a revival and sociological science gradually asserts itself as an academic discipline (See Guglielmo Rinzivillo, Science and the Object. Self-criticism of strategic knowledge, Milan, Franco Angeli, 2010, p. 52 ff., ISBN 9788856824872).

At the turn of the 20th century the first generation of German sociologists formally introduced methodological antipositivism, proposing that research should concentrate on human cultural norms, values, symbols, and social processes viewed from a subjective perspective. Max Weber argued that sociology may be loosely described as a 'science' as it is able to identify causal relationships—especially among ideal types, or hypothetical simplifications of complex social phenomena. As a nonpositivist however, one seeks relationships that are not as "ahistorical, invariant, or generalizable" as those pursued by natural scientists. Both Weber and Georg Simmel pioneered the Verstehen (or 'interpretative') approach toward social science; a systematic process in which an outside observer attempts to relate to a particular cultural group, or indigenous people, on their own terms and from their own point-of-view. Through the work of Simmel, in particular, sociology acquired a possible character beyond positivist data-collection or grand, deterministic systems of structural law. Relatively isolated from the sociological academy throughout his lifetime, Simmel presented idiosyncratic analyses of modernity more reminiscent of the phenomenological and existential writers than of Comte or Durkheim, paying particular concern to the forms of, and possibilities for, social individuality. His sociology engaged in a neo-Kantian critique of the limits of perception, asking 'What is society?' in a direct allusion to Kant's question 'What is nature?'

== 20th century: functionalism, structuralism, critical theory and globalization ==
=== Early 20th century ===
In the early 20th century, sociology expanded in the U.S., including developments in both macrosociology, concerned with the evolution of societies, and microsociology, concerned with everyday human social interactions. Based on the pragmatic social psychology of George Herbert Mead (1863–1931), Herbert Blumer (1900–1987) and, later, the Chicago school, sociologists developed symbolic interactionism.

In the 1920s, György Lukács released History and Class Consciousness (1923), while a number of works by Durkheim and Weber were published posthumously. During the same period members of the Frankfurt school, such as Theodor W. Adorno (1903–1969) and Max Horkheimer (1895–1973), developed critical theory, integrating the historical materialistic elements of Marxism with the insights of Weber, Freud and Gramsci—in theory, if not always in name—often characterizing capitalist modernity as a move away from the central tenets of the Enlightenment.

In the 1930s, Talcott Parsons (1902–1979) aimed to bring together the various strands of sociology, with the aim of developing a universal methodology. He developed action theory and functionalism, integrating the study of social order with the structural and voluntaristic aspects of macro and micro factors, while placing the discussion within a higher explanatory context of system theory and cybernetics. Parsons had also suggested starting from the 'bottom up' rather than the 'top down' when researching social order. One of his students, Harold Garfinkel, followed in this direction, developing ethnomethodology. In Austria and later the U.S., Alfred Schütz (1899–1959) developed social phenomenology, which would later inform social constructionism.

=== Mid 20th century ===
In some countries, sociology was undermined by totalitarian governments for reasons of ostensible political control. After the Russian Revolution, sociology was gradually "politicized, Bolshevisized and eventually, Stalinized" until it virtually ceased to exist in the Soviet Union. In China, the discipline was banned with semiotics, comparative linguistics and cybernetics as "Bourgeois pseudoscience" in 1952, not to return until 1979. During the same period, however, sociology was also undermined by conservative universities in the West. This was due, in part, to perceptions of the subject as possessing an inherent tendency, through its own aims and remit, toward liberal or left wing thought. Given that the subject was founded by structural functionalists; concerned with organic cohesion and social solidarity, this view was somewhat groundless (though it was Parsons who had introduced Durkheim to American audiences, and his interpretation has been criticized for a latent conservatism).

In the mid-20th century Robert K. Merton released his Social Theory and Social Structure (1949). Around the same time, C. Wright Mills continued Weber's work of understanding how modernity was undermining tradition, with a critique of the dehumanizing impact this had on people. Also using the Weberian notion of class, he found that the United States was at the time ruled by a power elite composed of military, political, economic and union leaders. His The Sociological Imagination (1959), argued that the problem was in people seeing their problems as individual issues, rather than as products of social processes. Also in 1959, Erving Goffman published The Presentation of Self in Everyday Life and introduced the theory of dramaturgical analysis which asserts that all individuals aim to create a specific impression of themselves in the minds of other people.

Wright Mills' ideas were influential on the New Left of the 1960s, which he had also coined the name for. Herbert Marcuse was subsequently involved in the movement. Following the counterculture of the decade, new thinkers emerged, especially in France, such as Michel Foucault. While power had earlier been viewed either in political or economic terms, Foucault argued that "power is everywhere, and comes from everywhere", seeing it as a type of relation present on every level of society that is a key component of social order. Examples of such relations included discourse and power-knowledge. Foucault also studied human sexuality with his The History of Sexuality (1976). Influenced by him, Judith Butler subsequently pioneered queer theory. Raewyn Connell in turn identified the stigmatization of homosexuality as a product of hegemonic masculinity.

In the 1960s, sociologists also developed new types of quantitative and qualitative research methods. Paul Lazarsfeld founded Columbia University's Bureau of Applied Social Research, where he exerted a tremendous influence over the techniques and the organization of social research. His many contributions to sociological method have earned him the title of the "founder of modern empirical sociology". Lazarsfeld made great strides in statistical survey analysis, panel methods, latent structure analysis, and contextual analysis. He is also considered a co-founder of mathematical sociology. Many of his ideas have been so influential as to now be considered self-evident.

In the 1970s, Peter Townsend redefined poverty from the previous definition of 'total earnings being too little to obtain the minimum necessities of physical life', to one which also took into account the relative deprivation caused, meaning that not having access to the typical level of lifestyle was also a form of poverty. During the same decade, Pierre Bourdieu, advancing the concept of habitus, argued that class was not defined solely by economic means, but also by the socially acquired taste which one shared with the rest of the class. Beyond economic capital, he also identified cultural, social, scholastic, linguistic, and political capital. These all contributed towards symbolic capital. Richard Sennett in turn found that working-class people were finding themselves in crisis following rising social status, as it conflicted with the values of their background.

==== Structuralism ====
Structuralism is "the belief that phenomena of human life are not intelligible except through their interrelations. These relations constitute a structure, and behind local variations in the surface phenomena there are constant laws of abstract structure". Structuralism in Europe developed in the early 1900s, mainly in France and Russian Empire, in the structural linguistics of Ferdinand de Saussure and the subsequent Prague, Moscow and Copenhagen schools of linguistics. In the late 1950s and early 1960s, when structural linguistics were facing serious challenges from the likes of Noam Chomsky and thus fading in importance, an array of scholars in the humanities borrowed Saussure's concepts for use in their respective fields of study. French anthropologist Claude Lévi-Strauss was arguably the first such scholar, sparking a widespread interest in structuralism.

==== Modernization theory ====
Modernization theory is used to explain the process of modernization within societies. Modernization refers to a model of a progressive transition from a 'pre-modern' or 'traditional' to a 'modern' society. Modernization theory originated from the ideas of German sociologist Max Weber (1864–1920), which provided the basis for the modernization paradigm developed by Harvard sociologist Talcott Parsons (1902–1979). The theory looks at the internal factors of a country while assuming that with assistance, "traditional" countries can be brought to development in the same manner more developed countries have been. Modernization theory was a dominant paradigm in the social sciences in the 1950s and 1960s, then went into a deep eclipse. It made a comeback after 1991 but remains a controversial model. Political sociologist Seymour Martin Lipset wrote extensively about the conditions for democracy in comparative perspective becoming influential in modernization theories and in emerging political science.

==== Dependency theory ====
In Latin America Dependency theory, a structuralist theory, emerged arguing that poor states are impoverished and rich ones enriched by the way poor states are integrated into the "world system". This theory was officially developed in the late 1960s following World War II, as scholars searched for the root issue in the lack of development in Latin America. The theory was popular in the 1960s and 1970s as a criticism of modernization theory, which was falling increasingly out of favor because of continued widespread poverty in much of the world. At that time the assumptions of liberal theories of development were under attack. It was used to explain the causes of overurbanization, a theory that urbanization rates outpaced industrial growth in several developing countries. Influenced by Dependency theory, World-systems theory emerged as a macro-scale approach to world history and social change which emphasizes the world-system (and not nation states) as the primary (but not exclusive) unit of social analysis. Immanuel Wallerstein has developed the best-known version of world-systems analysis, beginning in the 1970s. Wallerstein traces the rise of the capitalist world-economy from the "long" 16th century (c. 1450–1640). The rise of capitalism, in his view, was an accidental outcome of the protracted crisis of feudalism (c. 1290–1450). Europe (the West) used its advantages and gained control over most of the world economy and presided over the development and spread of industrialization and capitalist economy, indirectly resulting in unequal development.

==== Systems theory ====
Niklas Luhmann described modern capitalism as dividing society into different systems – economic, educational, scientific, legal, political and other systems – which together form the system of systems that is society itself. This system is in turn formed by communication, which is defined as the "synthesis of information, utterance, and understanding" emerging from verbal and non-verbal activities. A social system is similar to a biological organism by reproducing itself through communication developing from communication. A system is anything with a 'distinction' from its environment, which is itself formed by other systems. These systems are connected by 'structural couplings' which translate communications from one system to another (including from humans to systems), the lack of which is a problem for modern capitalism.

==== Post-structuralism and postmodernism ====
In the 1960s and 1970s post-structuralist and postmodernist theory, drawing upon structuralism and phenomenology as much as classical social science, made a considerable impact on frames of sociological enquiry. Often understood simply as a cultural style 'after-Modernism' marked by intertextuality, pastiche and irony, sociological analyses of postmodernity have presented a distinct era relating to (1) the dissolution of metanarratives (particularly in the work of Lyotard), and (2) commodity fetishism and the 'mirroring' of identity with consumption in late capitalist society (Debord; Baudrillard; Jameson). Postmodernism has also been associated with the rejection of enlightenment conceptions of the human subject by thinkers such as Michel Foucault, Claude Lévi-Strauss and, to a lesser extent, in Louis Althusser's attempt to reconcile Marxism with anti-humanism. Most theorists associated with the movement actively refused the label, preferring to accept postmodernity as a historical phenomenon rather than a method of analysis, if at all. Nevertheless, self-consciously postmodern pieces continue to emerge within the social and political sciences in general.

=== Late 20th century sociology ===
==== Intersectionality ====
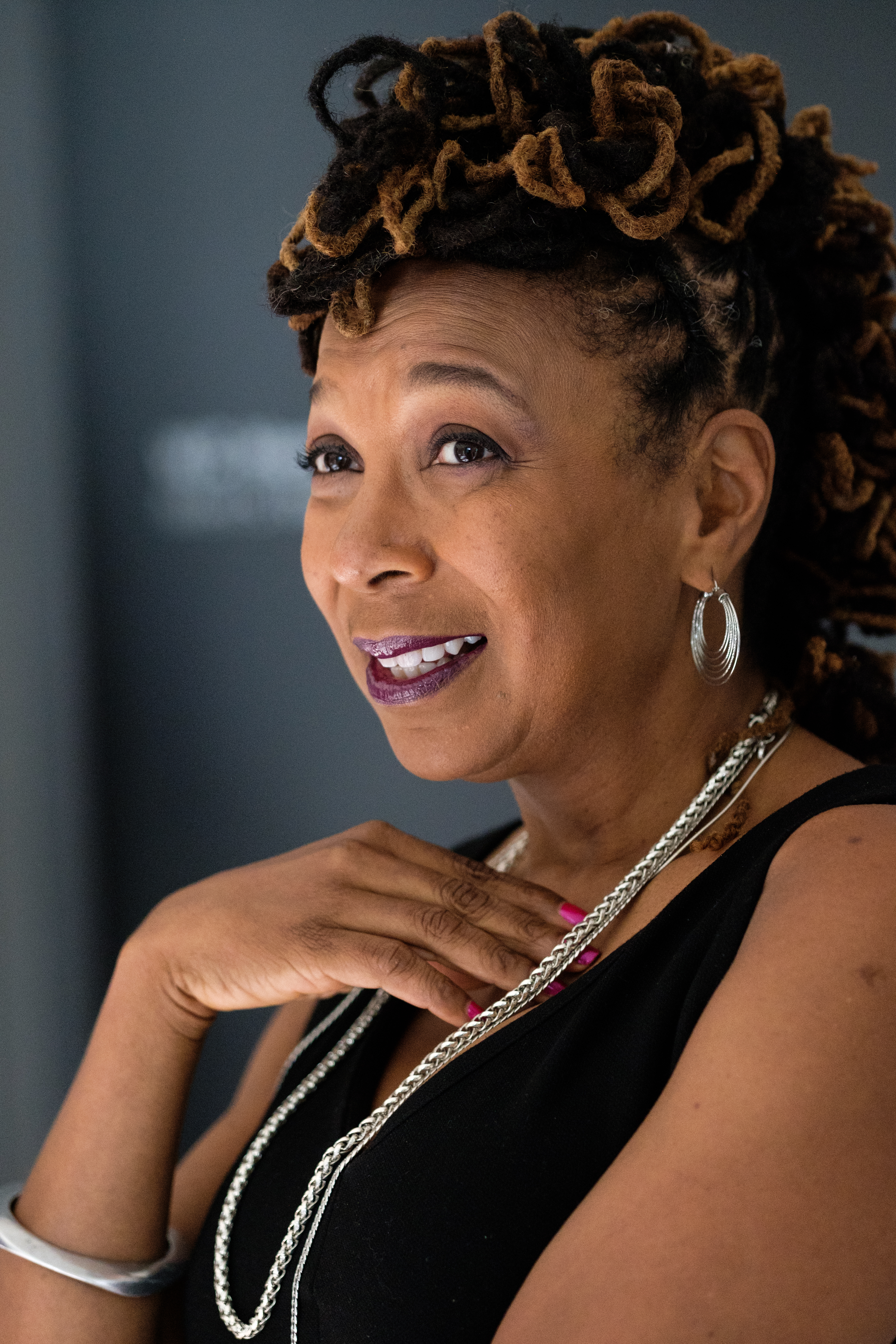
Kimberlé Crenshaw

In the 1980s, bell hooks argued that white and non-white women faced different obstacles in society. Kimberlé Crenshaw subsequently developed the concept of intersectionality in 1989 to describe the way different identities intersected to create differing forms of discrimination. In 1990, Sylvia Walby argued that six intersecting structures upheld patriarchy: the family household, paid work, the state, male violence, sexuality, and cultural institutions. Later, the sociologist Helma Lutz described 14 'lines of difference' which could form the basis of unequal power relations.

==== Globalization ====
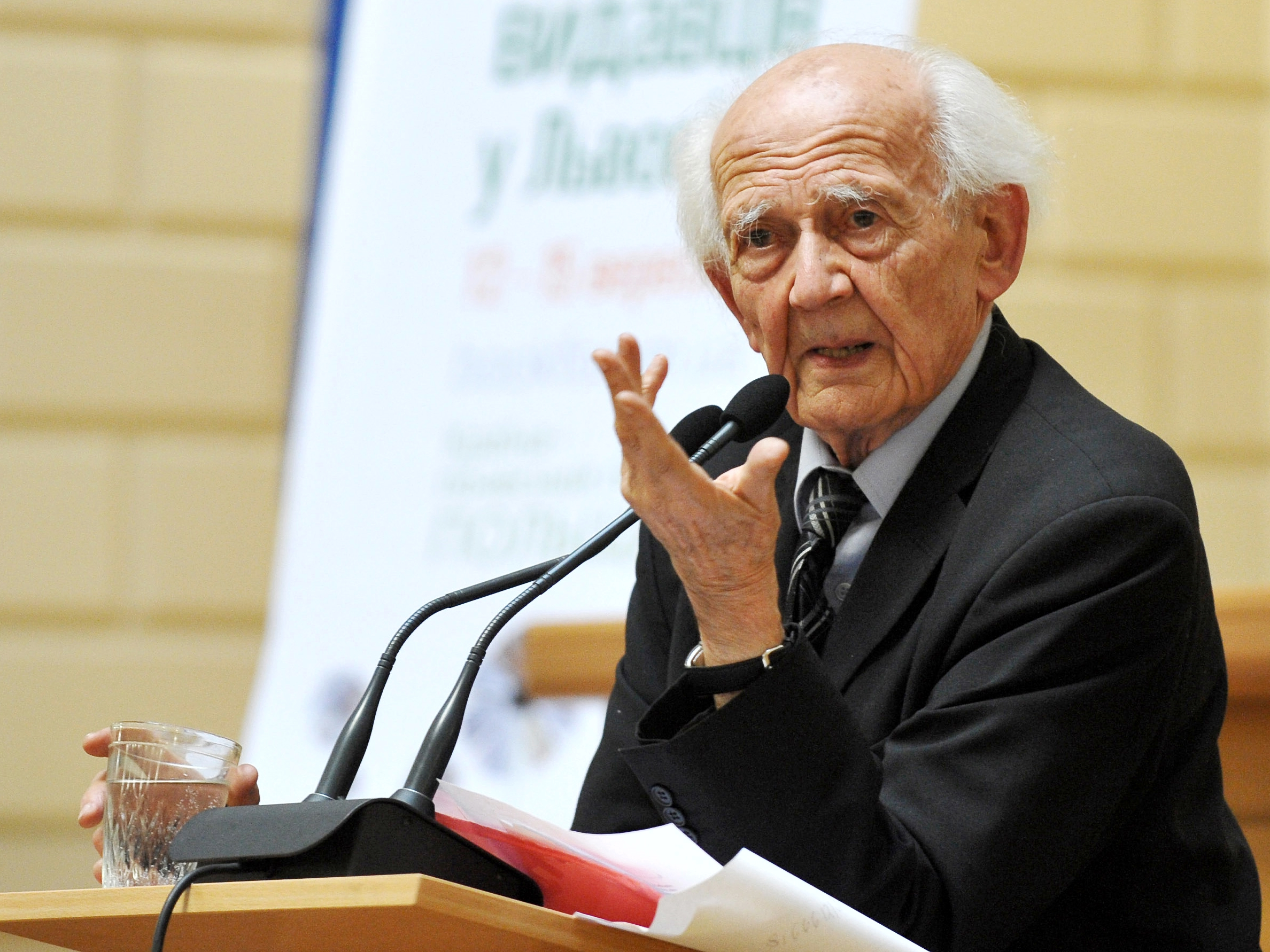
Zygmunt Bauman

Elsewhere in the 1980s, theorists often focused on globalization, communication, and reflexivity in terms of a 'second' phase of modernity, rather than a distinct new era per se. Jürgen Habermas established communicative action as a reaction to postmodern challenges to the discourse of modernity, informed both by critical theory and American pragmatism. Fellow German sociologist, Ulrich Beck, presented The Risk Society (1992) as an account of the manner in which the modern nation state has become organized. In Britain, Anthony Giddens set out to reconcile recurrent theoretical dichotomies through structuration theory. During the 1990s, Giddens developed work on the challenges of "high modernity", as well as a new 'third way' politics that would greatly influence New Labour in U.K. and the Clinton administration in the U.S. Leading Polish sociologist, Zygmunt Bauman, wrote extensively on the concepts of modernity and postmodernity, particularly with regard to the Holocaust and consumerism as historical phenomena. While Pierre Bourdieu gained significant critical acclaim for his continued work on cultural capital, certain French sociologists, particularly Jean Baudrillard and Michel Maffesoli, were criticised for perceived obfuscation and relativism.

Functionalist systems theorists such as Niklas Luhmann remained dominant forces in sociology up to the end of the century. In 1994, Robert K. Merton won the National Medal of Science for his contributions to the sociology of science. The positivist tradition is popular to this day, particularly in the United States. The discipline's two most widely cited American journals, the American Journal of Sociology and the American Sociological Review, primarily publish research in the positivist tradition, with ASR exhibiting greater diversity (the British Journal of Sociology, on the other hand, publishes primarily non-positivist articles). The twentieth century saw improvements to the quantitative methodologies employed in sociology. The development of longitudinal studies that follow the same population over the course of years or decades enabled researchers to study long-term phenomena and increased the researchers' ability to infer causality.

== 21st century sociology ==
The increase in the size of data sets produced by the new survey methods was followed by the invention of new statistical techniques for analyzing this data. Analysis of this sort is usually performed with statistical software packages such as R, SAS, Stata, or SPSS.

Social network analysis is an example of a new paradigm in the positivist tradition. The influence of social network analysis is pervasive in many sociological sub fields such as economic sociology (see the work of J. Clyde Mitchell, Harrison White, or Mark Granovetter, for example), organizational behavior, historical sociology, political sociology, or the sociology of education. There is also a minor revival of a more independent, empirical sociology in the spirit of C. Wright Mills, and his studies of the Power Elite in the United States of America, according to Stanley Aronowitz.

Critical realism is a philosophical approach to understanding science developed by Roy Bhaskar (1944–2014). It combines a general philosophy of science (transcendental realism) with a philosophy of social science (critical naturalism). It specifically opposes forms of empiricism and positivism by viewing science as concerned with identifying causal mechanisms. Also, in the context of social science it argues that scientific investigation can lead directly to critique of social arrangements and institutions, in a similar manner to the work of Karl Marx. In the last decades of the twentieth century it also stood against various forms of 'postmodernism'. It is one of a range of types of philosophical realism, as well as forms of realism advocated within social science such as analytic realism and subtle realism.

== See also ==
- Bibliography of sociology
- List of sociologists
- Outline of sociology
- Subfields of sociology
- Timeline of sociology
- Philosophy of social science
