= 1810s in sociology =

- 1810s in sociology
- 1820s

The following events related to sociology occurred in the 1810s.

== 1813 ==
Events

- Henri de Saint-Simon's Physiologie sociale is published.

== 1816 ==
Events

- Philosopher G. W. F. Hegel's Science of Logic is published.

Births

- Maurice Block (February 18, 1816 – January, 9 1901)
- John Woolley (February 28, 1816 – January 11, 1866)
- Charlotte Brontë (April 21, 1816 – March 31, 1855)
- Philip James Bailey (April 22, 1816 – September 6, 1902)
- Grace Aguilar (June 1816 – September 16, 1847)
- Sir John Brown (December 6, 1816 – December 27, 1896)

Deaths

- Samuel Hood (December 12, 1724 – January 27, 1816)
- Richard Brinsley Sheridan (October 30, 1751 – July 7, 1816)
- Gavriil Derzhavin (July 14, 1743 – July 20, 1816)

== 1817 ==
Events

- David Ricardo's Principles of Political Economy and Taxation is published.
- Henri de Saint-Simon's L'Industrie is started.

== 1818 ==
Events

- Louis-Gabriel de Bonald's Recherches philosophiques sur les premiers objets des connaissances morales is published.

Births

- Karl Marx (May 5, 1818 – March 14, 1883)

== 1819 ==
Events

- Henri de Saint-Simon's L'Organisateur is published. (writing aided by Auguste Comte and Augustin Thierry)

== Sources ==
- McLellan, David (2006). Karl Marx: A Biography (4th ed.). Hampshire: Palgrave MacMillan. ISBN 978-1403997302.
- Nicolaievsky, Boris; Maenchen-Helfen, Otto (1976) [1936]. Karl Marx: Man and Fighter. Translated by David, Gwenda; Mosbacher, Eric. Harmondsworth and New York: Pelican. ISBN 978-1406727036.
- Wheen, Francis (2001). Karl Marx. London: Fourth Estate. ISBN 978-1857026375.
