= Sociology of death =

Branch of sociology

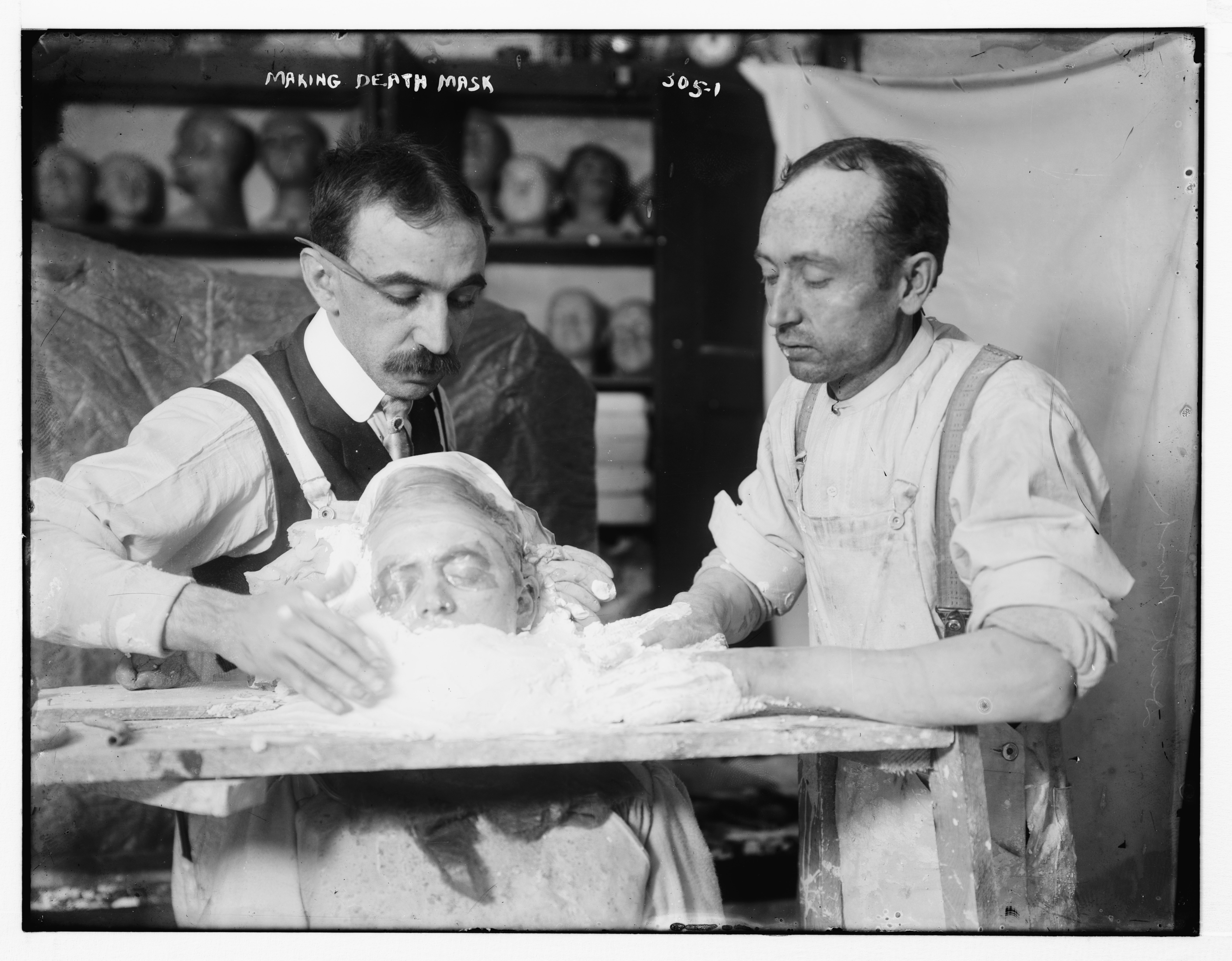
Making of a death mask.

The sociology of death (sometimes known as sociology of death, dying and bereavement or death sociology) explores and examines the relationships between society and death.

These relationships can include religious, cultural, philosophical, family, to behavioural insights among many others. It widens our understanding of death as more than clinical death, but a process combining social elements from the immediate needs of deathcare to wider social beliefes. Involving multiple disciplines, the sociology of deathcare can be seen as an interdisciplinary field of study across sociology and its sub-fields.

== Definition ==
The sociology of death can be defined as an interdisciplinary and relatively recent field of research concerned with the interactions of dying, death, and grief with society. It explores and examines both the micro to macro levels of interaction; from relationships of death upon individuals to its process across society. The precise characterisation of the sociology of death is debated, but primarily revolves around the idea that death is a social construct. Experiences both as an audience and participant of dying and death, are highly shaped by social factors.

== History ==
=== 19th century ===
The development of the sociology of death can be attributed, at least within a Western concept of sociology, with Harriet Martineau. Martineau's work, reflecting on suicide, reaction from it by religion, to insights into national morals, through their book How to Observe Morals and Manners (1838) helped establish a sociological methodology of death.

Émile Durkheim, in his work Suicide (1897) and The Elementary Forms of the Religious Life (1912), contributed to the sociological exploration and examination of death and its social impact; introducing sociological monographs, case studies, and statistical evidence to this field of study.

In The Elementary Forms of the Religious Life, Durkheim outlines: 'when someone dies, the group to which he belongs feels itself lessened and, to react against this loss, it assembles. Collective sentiments are renewed which then lead men to seek one another and to assemble together'. Here, evidence to the sociological nature of dying and death are considered.

To an extent Weber is also attributed to the creation of a sociology of death. In their work on Puritan beliefs and the development of capitalism they outline that death, although the end of an individual, can be seen as a crucial moment where the development of society takes place within. Through rituals and belief systems, common collective agreement of what society should be is born. In the Puritan case study, Weber's work leans on the afterlife belief of predestination – a belief system that Weber outlined helped to establish capitalist society.

=== 20th century ===
Precursory work, as seen above, had created a prototype field of research for the sociology of death to grow out from. Further work in the 1960s grew into a defined interdisciplinary field from the 1990s with great outputs of research and offerings of academic courses on sociologically related issues around death.

== Interdisciplinary nature ==
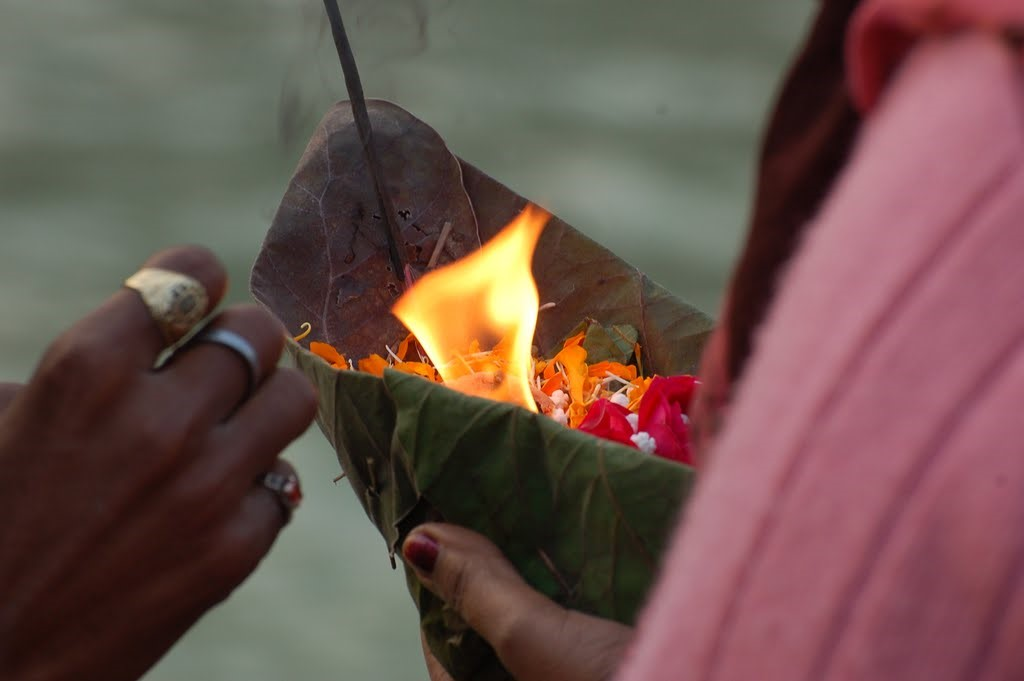
Funeral rites in India.

The sociology of death highlights distinct social considerations to explore aspects of dying, death, and grief that surround the emotional ending of human life. However, there are also cognitive, behavioural, and spiritual aspects to consider in the sociological examination of death. The sociology of death has a distinct interdisciplinary nature that leans on closely associated fields of research with sociology.

Key intersections include anthropological, archeological, historical, psychological, to political to name a few.

=== Thanatology ===
The overlap of the scientific study of death and sociology have produced areas of research focused on deathcare professionals, near-death experiences, to reducing pain and social suffering in dying.

== Research themes ==
=== Death taboo ===
A common theme of research into the sociology of death is the taboo or perceived social taboo that surrounds death. "Death denial" culture and interaction within society is both a heavily researched and critiqued area.

=== Declining mortality ===
Throughout the world, mortality rates have declined over time , This has historically influenced attitudes towards death. As age-related illness and diseases have become more common, social perceptions of a "good death" have changed along with advancements in medicine and technology.

=== Dying vs. Bereaved ===
Challenging how death is perceived and examining dying from the perspective of those dying, rather than their carers and family.

== Criticisms ==
=== Western centricism ===
As a field of study, throughout course books to articles, a focus on Western societies has produced a Eurocentric and Western centric views of the sociology of death.

== Journals ==
- Death Studies
- Mortality
- Omega: Journal of Death and Dying and Death Studies

== See also ==
- Death and culture
