= 1830s in sociology =

- 1820s
- 1830s in sociology
- 1840s
Other topics in 1830s:
- Fashion
- Music

The following events related to sociology occurred in the 1830s.

== 1831 ==
Events

- Lambert Adolphe Jacques Quetelet's The Propensity to Crime is published.

== 1834 ==
Events

- Harriet Martineau's Illustrations of Taxation is published.

Deaths

- December 23: Thomas Malthus (born February 13, 1766)

== 1835 ==
Events

- Lambert Adolphe Jacques Quételet' On Man and the Development of Human Facilities, An essay in Social Physics
- Alexis de Tocqueville's Democracy in America is published.

== 1837 ==
Events

- Harriet Martineau' Society in America

== 1838 ==
Events

- Harriet Martineau' How to Observe Morals and Manners`
