= Department of Sociology and Social Work (Uzhhorod National University) =

The Department of Sociology and Social Work of Uzhhorod National University is one of the four departments of the Faculty of Social Sciences UzhNU (the structure of the Faculty are formed by 4 departments: Department of Political Science and Public Administration, Department of Sociology and Social Work, Department of Psychology, Department of Philosophy).

Uzhhorod National University was one of the first universities in Ukraine to teach the specialty "Social work". That's why at the Lawyer Faculty UzhDU was created the department of social work in 1996 and was taken the first set of students. Doctor of Philosophy, Professor II Myhovych was selected to be the Head of Department. Since 2004 the department was headed by professor. I.V. Kozubovska, Ph.D. in pedagogics, and from 2015 - professor F.F. Shandor, Ph.D. in Philosophy.

The educational process of future social workers and sociologists is provided by 2 doctors, professors, 14 candidates of sciences. In addition, the learning process involve doctors, professors of leading national and foreign universities.

== The studying process ==
The department provides following levels:

- "Bachelor" - the normative study period - 4 years (8 terms), qualification "Bachelor of Social Work" (0102 6.13);
- "Bachelor" - the normative study period - 4 years (8 terms), qualification "Bachelor of Sociology" (6.030101);
- "Master" - the normative study period - 1,5 years (3 terms), qualification "Master of Social Work" (8.13010201).

According to the qualification graduates can work in departments of labor and social protection, employment centers, services for children, social centers for families, children and youth, medical and social rehabilitation centers, prevention of AIDS, drug clinics, community organizations and others. The department also has a postgraduate specialty "Social structures and social relations" (22.00.03), where were completed 8 candidate dissertations during its existence.

== Partnerships and scientific activity ==
The Department of Sociology and Social Work UzhNU is an active participant of international partnerships, especially with such countries as Great Britain, Belgium, the United States, Russia, Hungary, Slovenia, Lithuania, Poland, Romania and others. The department also cooperates with Ukrainian universities that train specialists in social work and sociology (NU "Kyiv-Mohyla Academy", Ternopil National Pedagogical University, Cherkasy National University, National University "Lviv Polytechnic", etc.).

For many years the department maintains the partnership with the project "TOUCH" (United States), which help orphaned children with impaired intellectual development, and charity fund named Fred Robbie (United States), which also helped to fill the Library of UzhNU with encyclopedias scientific literature on sociology, social work, psychology and political science. The organization also provides scholarships for the best students from poor families.

The department organize scientific conferences, seminars and summer schools for students - future social workers. For example, for 10 years, together with the charitable organization "TOUCH", it annually holds international scientific-practical conference "Actual problems of social work", and its results are published in papers and reports.

Department publishes the "Scientific Bulletin Series: Pedagogy. Social Work" - a list of professional publications, approved by the MES of Ukraine (already has been published about 37 items).

Department is one of the few in Ukraine, that has its own library with more than 8000 copies of literature (Ukrainian and foreign) from different disciplines (pedagogy, law, sociology, social work, management, foreign languages). There is a mini-printing, which has published about a hundred books and manuals, tutorials, guidelines and other training materials to help students and social workers.

== Students leisure ==
Students of social work participate actively in university life (students' sports and entertainment competitions, cultural and artistic events, flash mobs), attend the discussion club and leisure center "Juventus", organize numerous faculty- and educational entertainments ("Freshman Day", "Miss of the faculty of social studies", organize meetings with prominent public and political people of Ukraine and other countries, student conferences, etc.).

The proper attention is given to physical education and sport, there are members of national teams in rugby, American football, basketball and k.m.s. among students and teachers.
