= Sociology and the history of science =

Diachronically-comparative sociological analysis of scienticity

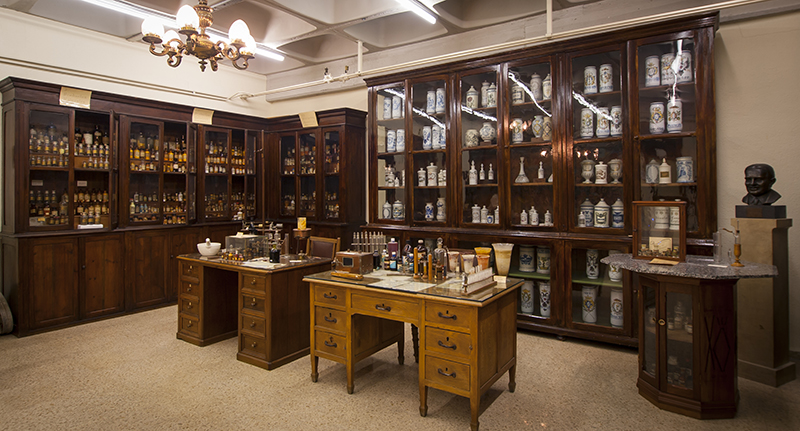
Pharmacy room of the Basque Museum of the History of Medicine and Science, Spain

Throughout the 20th and 21st century, sociological inquiry has sought to analyze large-scale socialized patterns and trends in the development of science, as well as ask and answer questions about how science "works" both in a philosophical and practical sense. In particular, sociologists concerned with the history of science ask how societies construct narratives about science, and how methodologies and paradigms throughout scientific history not only change, but change in context to culture, authority, political economy, and more sociologically strident means of analysis.

== Science as a social enterprise ==
In the last few centuries, science as a social enterprise has grown rapidly. The few individuals who could conduct natural research in antiquity were either wealthy individuals themselves, had wealthy sponsors, or had the backing of a religious group. Today, scientific research has tremendous government support and also ongoing support from the private sector.

Available methods of communication have improved tremendously over time. Instead of waiting months or years for a hand-copied letter to arrive, today scientific communication can be practically instantaneous. Earlier, most natural philosophers worked in relative isolation, due to the difficulty and slowness of communication. Still, there was a considerable amount of cross-fertilization between distant groups and individuals.

Nowadays, almost all modern scientists participate in a scientific community, hypothetically global in nature (though often based around a relatively few nations and institutions of stature), but also strongly segregated into different fields of study. The scientific community is important because it represents a source of established knowledge which, if used properly, ought to be more reliable than personally acquired knowledge of any given individual. The community also provides a feedback mechanism, often in the form of practices such as peer review and reproducibility. Most items of scientific content (experimental results, theoretical proposals, or literature reviews) are reported in scientific journals and are hypothetically subjected to peer scrutiny, though a number of scholarly critics from both inside and outside the scientific community have, in recent decades, began to question the effect of commercial and government investment in science on the peer review and publishing process, as well as the internal disciplinary limitations to the scientific publication process.

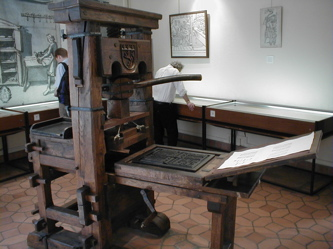
Gutenberg-era printing presses allowed the rapid spread of new ideas across 15th and 16th century Europe.

A major development of the Scientific Revolution was the foundation of scientific societies: Academia Secretorum Naturae (Accademia dei Segreti, the Academy of the Mysteries of Nature) can be considered the first scientific community; founded in Naples 1560 by Giambattista della Porta. The academy had an exclusive membership rule: discovery of a new law of nature was a prerequisite for admission. It was soon shut down by Pope Paul V for alleged sorcery.

The Academia Secretorum Naturae was replaced by the Accademia dei Lincei, which was founded in Rome in 1603. The Lincei included Galileo as a member, but failed upon his condemnation in 1633. The Accademia del Cimento, Florence 1657, lasted 10 years. The Royal Society of London, 1660 to the present day, brought together a diverse collection of scientists to discuss theories, conduct experiments, and review each other's work. The Académie des Sciences was created as an institution of the government of France 1666, meeting in the King's library. The Akademie der Wissenschaften began in Berlin 1700.

Early scientific societies provided valuable functions, including a community open to and interested in empirical inquiry, and also more familiar with and more educated about the subject. In 1758, with the aid of his pupils, Lagrange established a society, which was subsequently incorporated as the Turin Academy.

Much of what is considered the modern institution of science was formed during its professionalization in the 19th century. During this time the location of scientific research shifted primarily to universities, though to some extent it also became a standard component of industry as well. In the early years of the 20th century, especially after the role of science in the first World War, governments of major industrial nations began to invest heavily in scientific research. This effort was dwarfed by the funding of scientific research undertaken by all sides in World War II, which produced such "wonder weapons" as radar, rocketry, and the atomic bomb. During the Cold War, a large amount of government resources were poured into science by the United States, USSR, and many European powers. It was during this time that DARPA funded nationwide computer networks including ARPANET the precursor to the Internet. In the post-Cold War era, a decline in government funding from many countries has been met with an increase of industrial and private investment. The funding of science is a major factor in its historical and global development. So although science is hypothetically international in scope, in a practical sense it has usually centered around wherever it could find the most funding.

During the Scientific Revolution, early scientists communicated in Latin, which had been the language of academia during the Middle Ages, and which was read and written by scholars from many countries. In the mid-1600s, publications started to appear in local languages. By 1900, German, French and English were dominant. Anti-German sentiment caused by World War I and World War II and boycotts of German scientists resulted in the loss of German as a scientific language. In later decades of the 20th century, the economic dominance and scientific productivity of the United States led to the rise of English, which after the end of the Cold War has become the dominant language of scientific communication.

== Political support ==
One of the basic requirements for a scientific community is the existence and approval of a political sponsor; in England, the Royal Society operates under the aegis of the monarchy; in the US, the National Academy of Sciences was founded by Act of the United States Congress; etc. Otherwise, when the basic elements of knowledge were being formulated, the political rulers of the respective communities could choose to arbitrarily either support or disallow the nascent scientific communities. For example, Alhazen had to feign madness to avoid execution. The polymath Shen Kuo lost political support, and could not continue his studies until he came up with discoveries that showed his worth to the political rulers. The admiral Zheng He could not continue his voyages of exploration after the emperors withdrew their support. Another famous example was the suppression of the work of Galileo, by the twentieth century, Galileo would be pardoned.

== Patterns in the history of science ==
One of the major occupations with those interested in the history of science is whether or not it displays certain patterns or trends, usually along the question of change between one or more scientific theories. Generally speaking, there have historically been three major models adopted in various forms within the philosophy of science.

Three models of change in scientific theories, depicted graphically to reflect roughly the different views associated with Karl Popper, Thomas Kuhn, and Paul Feyerabend

The first major model, implicit in most early histories of science and generally a model put forward by practicing scientists themselves in their textbook literature, is associated with the criticisms of logical positivism by Karl Popper (1902–1994) from the 1930s. Popper's model of science is one in which scientific progress is achieved through a falsification of incorrect theories and the adoption instead of theories which are progressively closer to truth. In this model, scientific progress is a linear accumulation of facts, each one adding to the last. In this model, the physics of Aristotle (384 BC – 322 BC) was simply subsumed by the work of Isaac Newton (1642–1727) (classical mechanics), which itself was eclipsed by the work of Albert Einstein (1879–1955) (Relativity), and later the theory of quantum mechanics (established in 1925), each one more accurate than the last.

A major challenge to this model came from the work of the historian and philosopher Thomas Kuhn (1922–1996) in his work The Structure of Scientific Revolutions published in 1962. Kuhn, a former physicist, argued against the view that scientific progress was linear, and that modern scientific theories were necessarily just more accurate versions of theories of the past. Rather, Kuhn's version of scientific development consisted of dominant structures of thought and practices, which he called "paradigms", in which research went through phases of "normal" science ("puzzle solving") and "revolutionary" science (testing out new theories based on new assumptions, brought on by uncertainty and crisis in existing theories). In Kuhn's model, different paradigms represented entirely different and incommensurate assumptions about the universe. The mode was thus uncertain about whether paradigms shifted in a way which necessarily relied upon greater attainment of truth. In Kuhn's view, Aristotle's physics, Newton's classical mechanics, and Einstein's Relativity were entirely different ways to think about the world; each successive paradigm defined what questions could be asked about the world and (perhaps arbitrarily) discarded aspects of the previous paradigm which no longer seemed applicable or important. Kuhn claimed that far from merely building on the previous theory's accomplishments, each new paradigm essentially throws out the old way of looking at the universe, and comes up with its own vocabulary to describe it and its own guidelines for expanding knowledge within the new paradigm.

Kuhn's model met with much suspicion from scientists, historians, and philosophers. Some scientists felt that Kuhn went too far in divorcing scientific progress from truth; many historians felt that his argument was too codified for something as polyvariant and historically contingent as scientific change; and many philosophers felt that the argument did not go far enough. The furthest extreme of such reasoning was put forth by the philosopher Paul Feyerabend (1924–1994), who argued that there were no consistent methodologies used by all scientists at all times which allowed certain forms of inquiry to be labeled "scientific" in a way which made them different from any other form of inquiry, such as witchcraft. Feyerabend argued harshly against the notion that falsification was ever truly followed in the history of science, and noted that scientists had long undertaken practices to arbitrarily consider theories to be accurate even if they failed many sets of tests. Feyerabend argued that a pluralistic methodology should be undertaken for the investigation of knowledge, and noted that many forms of knowledge which were previously thought to be "non-scientific" were later accepted as a valid part of the scientific canon.

Many other theories of scientific change have been proposed over the years with various changes of emphasis and implications. In general, though, most float somewhere between these three models for change in scientific theory, the connection between theory and truth, and the nature of scientific progress.

The relationship between sociology and the history of science lies at the heart of a theoretical reexamination of the discussions and approaches that have emerged since Kuhn. Epistemological history is considered alongside the history of the sociology of science. Emphasis is placed on the role of systematic source research during the formative periods of science. Retroactive models are excluded from scientific analysis. A systematic approach to source research prevails. For this framework, we can refer to a trilogy: ( Guglielmo Rinzivillo, Storia della sociologia scientifica. Per ripartire dai classici e usarli in modo nuovo, Turin, Utet, 2023, ISBN 9788860089489; Storia della sociologia scientifica. I contemporanei, Turin, Utet, 2025, ISBN 9791255970088; Storia della sociologia scientifica. La storia epistemologica. Istruzioni per l’uso, Rome, Nuova Cultura, 2026, ISBN 9788833658889).

== The nature of scientific discovery ==
Individual ideas and accomplishments are among the most famous aspects of science, both internally and in larger society. Breakthrough figures like Sir Isaac Newton or Albert Einstein are often celebrated as geniuses and heroes of science. Popularizers of science, including the news media and scientific biographers, contribute to this phenomenon. But many scientific historians emphasize the collective aspects of scientific discovery, and de-emphasize the importance of the "Eureka!" moment.

A detailed look at the history of science often reveals that the minds of great thinkers were primed with the results of previous efforts, and often arrive on the scene to find a crisis of one kind or another. For example, Einstein did not consider the physics of motion and gravitation in isolation. His major accomplishments solved a problem which had come to a head in the field only in recent years—empirical data showing that the speed of light was inexplicably constant, no matter the apparent speed of the observer. (See Michelson–Morley experiment.) Without this information, it is very unlikely that Einstein would have conceived of anything like relativity.

The question of who should get credit for any given discovery is often a source of some controversy. There are many priority disputes, in which multiple individuals or teams have competing claims over who discovered something first. Multiple simultaneous discovery is actually a surprisingly common phenomenon, perhaps largely explained by the idea that previous contributions (including the emergence of contradictions between existing theories, or unexpected empirical results) make a certain concept ready for discovery. Simple priority disputes are often a matter of documenting when certain experiments were performed, or when certain ideas were first articulated to colleagues or recorded in a fixed medium.

Many times the question of exactly which event should qualify as the moment of discovery is difficult to answer. One of the most famous examples of this is the question of the discovery of oxygen. While Carl Wilhelm Scheele and Joseph Priestley were able to concentrate oxygen in the laboratory and characterize its properties, they did not recognize it as a component of air. Priestly actually thought it was missing a hypothetical component of air, known as phlogiston, which air was supposed to absorb from materials that are being burned. It was only several years later that Antoine Lavoisier first conceived of the modern notion of oxygen—as a substance that is consumed from the air in the processes of burning and respiration.

By the late 20th century, scientific research has become a large-scale effort, largely accomplished in institutional teams. The amount and frequency of inter-team collaboration has continued to increase, especially after the rise of the Internet, which is a central tool for the modern scientific community. This further complicates the notion of individual accomplishment in science.

== See also ==
- Historiography of science
- Inquiry
- Scientific method
