= 1820s in sociology =

- 1810s
- 1820s in sociology
- 1830s
Other topics in 1820s:
- Fashion

The following events related to sociology occurred in the 1820s.

== 1820 ==
Events

- Thomas Malthus's Principles of Political Economy is published.

Births

- April 27: Herbert Spencer
- November 28: Friedrich Engels

Events

- Georg Wilhelm Friedrich Hegel's Social Classes is published.

== 1822 ==
Events

- Auguste Comte's Plan of scientific studies necessary for the reorganization of society
- G. W. F. Hegel's Elements of the Philosophy of Right

== 1824 ==
Events

- Henri de Saint-Simon's Catéchisme des industriels is published.

== 1826 ==
Events

- Auguste Comte' The Crisis of Industrial Civilization
