= 1840s in sociology =

- 1830s
- 1840s in sociology
- 1850s
Other topics in 1840s:
- Fashion

The following events related to sociology occurred in the 1840s.

== 1840 ==
- Pierre-Joseph Proudhon's What is Property? is published.

== 1841 ==
- Auguste Comte published Volume 5 of The Course of Positive Philosophy: La Partie Historique De La Philosophie Sociale

== 1842 ==
- Auguste Comte publishes Volume 6 of The Course in Positive Philosophy: Le Complément De La Philosophie Sociale Et Les Conclusions Générales, completing the series.
- Auguste Comte's Sociologie Comme Instruction Affirmative is published
- Auguste Comte's Social Statics and Social Dynamics is published

== 1843 ==
- Søren Kierkegaard's Either/Or is published in two volumes.
- John Stuart Mill's A System of Logic, Ratiocinative and Inductive is published in two volumes.

== 1844 ==
- Friedrich Engels' Outline of A Critique of Political Economy is published
- Engels and Marx's The Holy Family is published
- Karl Marx's Economic and Philosophic Manuscripts are written.
- Max Stirner's The Ego and Its Own is published in German.

== 1845 ==
- Friedrich Engels' Conditions of the Working Class in England (original German edition) is published

== 1846 ==
- Marx and Engels' The German Ideology is written.
- Pierre-Joseph Proudhon's The System of Economic Contradictions or the Philosophy of Poverty is published
- Søren Kierkegaard's Two Ages: A Literary Review is published

== 1847 ==
- Friedrich Engels' The Principles of Communism is written during October–November
- Karl Marx's The Poverty of Philosophy is published, a critique of Proudhon's 1846 work.

== 1848 ==
- Engels and Marx's The Communist Manifesto is published
- Study group on the social question held attended by Frederic Le Play, Jean Reynaud, Lamartine, François Arago, Carnot, Lanjuinais, Tocqueville, Montalembert, Sainte-Beuve, Agénor de Gasparin, Abbé Dupanloup, Adolphe Thiers, Auguste Cochin, Charles Dupin and others

== 1849 ==
- Søren Kierkegaard's The Sickness Unto Death is published.
