= Maurice Block =

German-French statistician and economist (1816–1901)

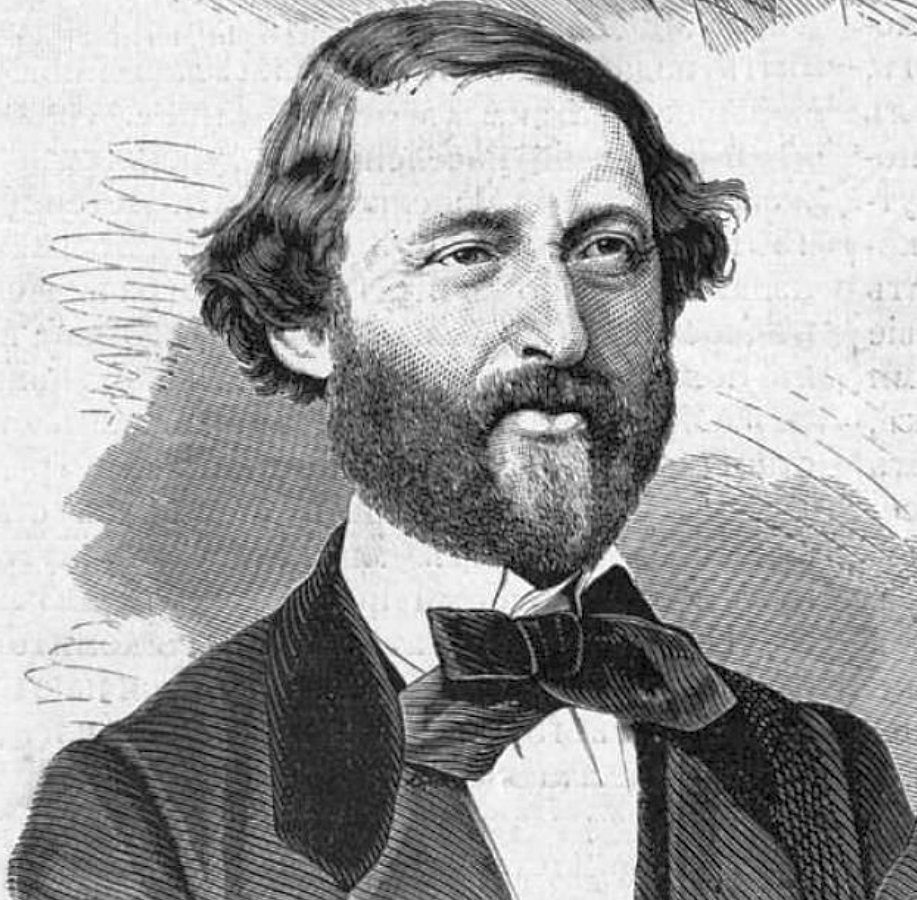
- Born: 18 February 1816; Berlin, Germany
- Died: 9 January 1901 (aged 84); Paris, France

Maurice Block (German: Moritz Block); 18 February 1816 – 9 January 1901) was a German-French statistician and economist.

== Biography ==
Block was born on 18 February 1816, in Berlin, to Jewish parents. He studied at the University of Bonn and the University of Heidelberg and received his doctorate from the University of Tübingen. In the mid-1840s, he moved to Paris to become a statistician with the French ministry of agriculture. In 1853, he moved on to the General Statistic service.

Beginning in 1856, Block edited L'Annuaire de l'economie politique et de la statistique. He remained the editor until 1901. Block, along with many French economists of his time, believed that economics was too complex of a subject to be amenable to mathematical techniques.

He retired in 1862 and thenceforth wrote predominantly on the topics of agriculture, finance and public administration, turning to criticism of socialism in the 1890s. A prolific writer, he was published in a number of academic and professional magazines and journals of the time. He continued to devote himself to statistical studies as well.

He was elected a member of the Académie des Sciences Morales et Politiques in 1880. He died in Paris on 9 January 1901, aged 84.

His principal works are:

- Dictionnaire de l'administration francaise (1856)
- Statistique de la France (1860)
- Dictionnaire general de la politique (1862)
- L'Europe politique et sociale (1869)
- Traité theorique et pratique de statistique (1878)
- Les Progres de l'economie politique depuis Adam Smith (1890)
- Die Bevolkerung des franzosischen Kaiserreichs (1861)
- Die Bevalkerung Spaniens and Portugals (1860)
- Die Machtstellung der europäischen Staaten (1862).

He wrote several books against socialism : Les théoriciens du socialisme en Allemagne (1872); Le socialisme moderne (1890). He is the author of the famous distinction between the three political lines : Orleanism, Legitimism and Bonapartism. As Adolphe Franck and Michel Breal, he is one of those Jewish Scholars who attempted to remain neutral during the Dreyfus affair.
