= Sociology of philosophy =

Academic discipline

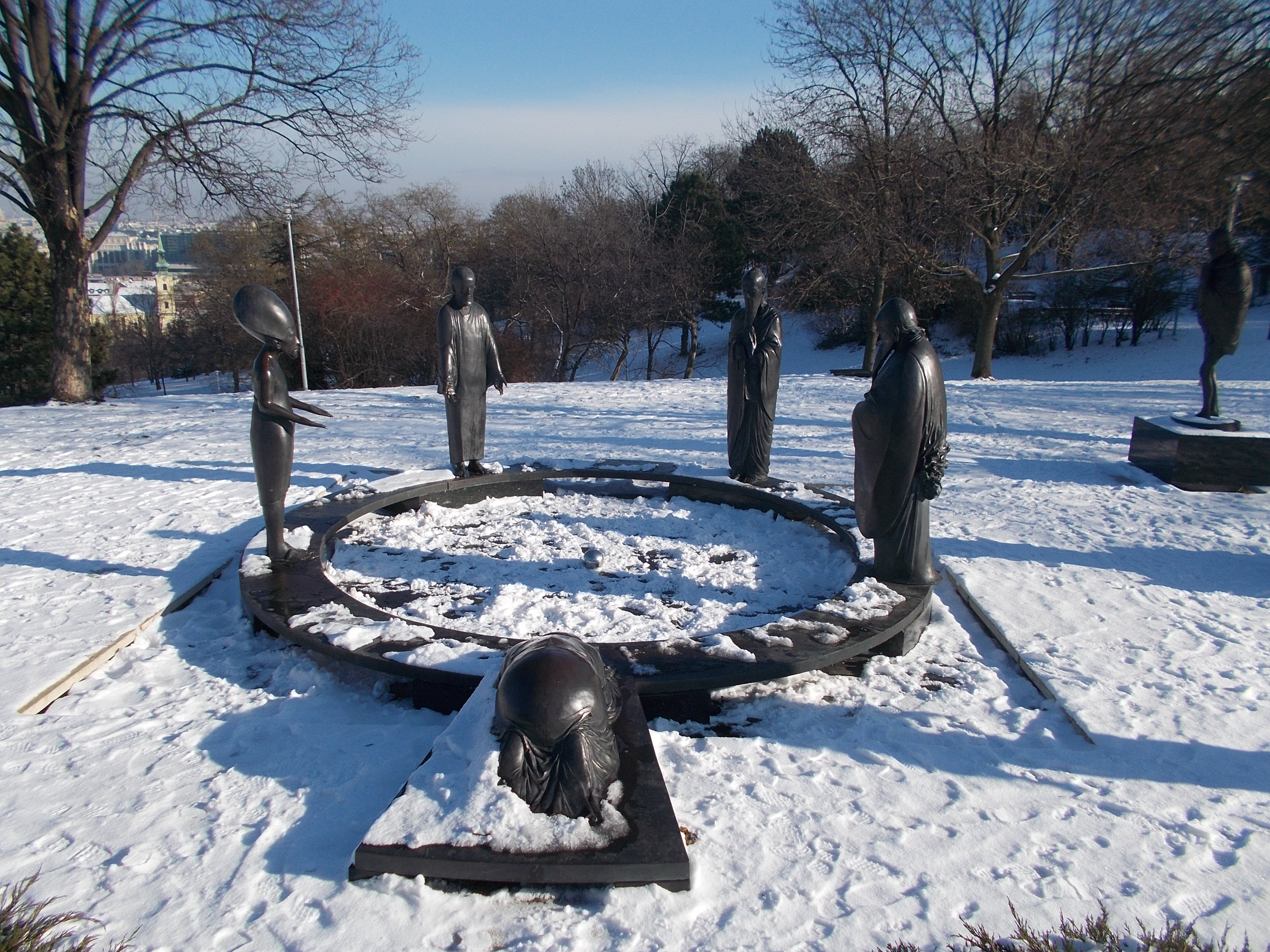
Garden of Philosophy on the side of Gellért hill Budapest, created “for a better mutual understanding” by Nándor Wagner.

Sociology of philosophy or philosophical sociology is an academic discipline of both sociology and philosophy that seeks to understand the influence of philosophical thought upon society alongside societal influence upon philosophy.

It seeks to understand the social conditions in which the intellectual activity and effects of philosophy take place to frame our understanding of explorations of truth and knowledge as social processes.

== History ==
The genealogy or founding of sociology can be traced from philosophy in its questions of society and societal knowledge. Prominent sociologists, including Marx and Durkheim, came from a philosophical background.

The precise separation of sociology and philosophy is blurred and changing. Sociology grew into a discipline out of philosophical research into a focus of the social and the workings of society. Philosophy itself, having withdrawn from claims of the natural world cemented by the rise of empiricism in the Enlightenment Era, instead focused further on criticism of both its way of "knowing" knowledge as well as other disciplines' claims on knowledge or epistemology.

Because of this, the history of sociology and philosophy is a pattern of back and forth, each examining the other alongside interdisciplinary explorations that intersect them both.

Sociology of philosophy, as an empirical sociological branch based on theory, was developed in the 1980s.
