= Subtle realism =

Philosophical position

Subtle realism is a philosophical position within social science that, along with other forms of realism, stands opposed to naïve realism and various forms of relativism and scepticism. The term was coined by Martyn Hammersley in 1992. Its central issue is the relationship between the investigator and the phenomena being studied: are those phenomena and their characteristics independent of the process of inquiry, or is the character of what is investigated determined, structured, or shaped by the research? Subtle realism insists that phenomena are independent, but that knowledge of them is always constructed by the investigator—rather than, for example, being logically derived from sense impressions. It also asserts that social inquiry cannot reproduce phenomena, or capture their essence, but can only produce answers to particular questions about them.

There are many concepts of realism, such as metaphysical realism, epistemological realism, internal realism, and critical realism. As with these other examples, subtle realism involves a contrast with rejected alternatives, in this case not just with forms of anti-realism but also with naïve realism. The latter is the idea that knowledge must be a direct product of contact between an investigator and an independently existing reality, this contact taking place via the senses or by some other direct means. A corollary of naïve realism is that, without such immediate contact, no knowledge is possible.

== Features ==
Against relativism, subtle realism asserts that there is a single reality (not multiple realities corresponding to different perspectives), and that it is possible to gain knowledge of the phenomena that make up this reality.

Against naive realism it holds that beliefs cannot be logically derived from, or proven absolutely via, sense impressions or any other kind of immediately given data; that a distinction must be drawn between what is true and what can be believed with justification, the latter being decided on the basis of what is beyond reasonable doubt; and that any understanding or knowledge produced comprises answers to particular questions about the phenomena, rather than capturing those phenomena "in themselves"—in other words, it cannot simply reproduce them.

Deciding what is beyond reasonable doubt involves assessing:

1. plausibility—the relationship between a knowledge claim and what is already taken to be well-established knowledge (Does it follow logically from this? Is it more weakly implied by this? Is it compatible with this? Is it at odds with this?);
2. credibility—how the knowledge claim was produced, specifically what were the chances of error in its production.

Faced with a knowledge claim that is neither sufficiently plausible nor credible to be beyond reasonable doubt, determining its likely truth depends upon the evidence available to support it. This evidence, in turn, is judged upon its plausibility and credibility. Beside the search for evidence, further information may also be sought about how the knowledge claim, or relevant evidence, was produced—so as to have better grounds for assessing its credibility.

To use a commonplace example from detective stories, a witness claims to have seen someone murdered. A first basis for judging this is whether or not the allegedly murdered person is known to be still alive—if so, the claim is very implausible. If the person concerned has disappeared, then the claim that murder has taken place is compatible with what is known, so this provides a degree of plausibility, though relatively weak; finding the body would increase the plausibility. To strengthen the basis for making a judgment about who was the killer it is necessary to make sure that the witness was where he or she claimed to have seen the murder; had a clear view of what went on; that what was seen is strongly indicative of murder; and so on. In seeking further evidence we may want information about the witness (how good is the eyesight, does he or she have any reason to lie, and so on), facts about the scene, or testimony from other witnesses. In this way a case can be built for concluding that a murder took place and who did it, that it did not take place, or that the validity of the witness's statement remains uncertain. Nevertheless, any claim about the murder remains fallible, even if it is beyond reasonable doubt.

The implications of subtle realism for social research are that scientific investigation of social phenomena is possible and desirable; and that it is quite distinct from, even though it shares some characteristics with, the production of literary or artistic fictions or the pursuit of practical or political goals. Equally important, it does not differ fundamentally in character from the ordinary inquiry and sensemaking that people do during the course of everyday life; though the questions it addresses are usually much more difficult to answer than mundane ones, and it employs refined methods designed to tackle those questions.

== See also ==
- Epistemic theories of truth
- Foundherentism
- Methodology
- Perspectivism
- Scientific evidence
- Scientific method
