= Humanistic sociology =

Domain of sociology

Humanistic sociology is a domain of sociology which originated mainly from the work of the University of Chicago Polish philosopher-turned-sociologist, Florian Znaniecki. It is a methodology which treats its objects of study and its students, that is, humans, as composites of values and systems of values. In certain contexts, the term is related to other sociological domains such as antipositivism. Humanistic sociology seeks to shed light on questions such as, "What is the relationship between a man of principle and a man of opportunism?"

== Origins ==
Humanistic sociology is a domain of sociology that grew from Anti positivism. It originated from the initial work of Florian Witold Znaniecki and W. I. Thomas who co-authored The Polish Peasant in Europe and America. Thomas, due to his multi-ethnic background, was fluent in Polish. He developed the life-history methodology, where data is obtained from letters and other materials, such as the archives of the Polish Emigrants Protective Association, of which Znaniecki was a director. Znaniecki was a philosopher who opposed idealism and naturalism, proposing instead a methodology for social research based around the "humanistic coefficient", sometimes known as the humanist principle. The outbreak of World War I led Znaniecki to join Thomas at Chicago.

Unfortunately for Thomas, he encountered political problems, ending his career as an academic. However, he went on to produce important works at the New School for Social Research, working with other notable scholars, such as Harold Laski. As a result, his role in the origins of Humanistic sociology is often understated.

Znaniecki went on to a distinguished academic career, taking the chair of sociology at the University of Poznan where he founded the Polish Sociological Institute. Fortunately for Znaniecki, at the outbreak of World War II, he was a visiting professor at Columbia University. Thus, he was spared the tragic history of his motherland. He became a professor at the University of Illinois, where he stayed until his death in 1958. His mantle passed to his gifted student, Stanisław Ossowski, who revived the Polish Sociological Institute after it had been liquidated by Stalinist authorities in 1951 (as the Polish Sociological Association). Ossowski maintained the noted and considerable resistance by Znaniecki to the "ideological control of science".

== The principle of analytic induction ==
Analytic induction is a method of social research that is inductive, where theories and concepts are modified as a result of doing research (see scientific method). The philosophical foundations of analytic induction originate from Aristotle and his concept of induction. Analytic induction can be thought of as a phenomenological process, that is the phenomena cannot occur or be understood separate from the process. Similar to the Socratic Method or Karl Popper's falsification, the researcher sets out to disprove his theory by maximizing the chance of producing negative evidence. Analytic induction was Znaniecki's answer to the problem of induction. Znaniecki believed analytic induction was a new process for conducting social research that is capable of universal and precise results.

== Structuralism vs. Functionalism ==
There is a debate between two competing schools of sociological thought, Structuralism and Functionalism. This debate is inherited from the European philosophical roots of humanistic sociology: Husserl's attempt via reflexion to extract the essence of experience as opposed to Heidegger's existential phenomenology. While each school lays claim to legitimate theory, each leads to quite different approaches when interpreting the results of research and developing conclusions. The genesis of the debate relates to the primacy of the Conceptual objects involved. Does a researcher consider the structural objects and their relation to the system as a priority, or does the researcher consider the function of the object as the priority? The problems found in each school will lead to static analysis.

=== Structuralism ===
Znaniecki's model was derived independently of Max Weber and Émile Durkheim. The concept of agency derived by Claude Lévi-Strauss provided the foundations for structuralism and the later work of sociologists such as Pierre Bourdieu. Structuralists influenced by humanistic sociology will interpret data in terms of opposing valuations, contrasts, and relations. Interpretation of the data must be contextual. Structuralism allows for a realist analysis (structures represent an organized reality) in relation to the larger social system. By understanding the larger social system, you are differentiating from post-modernism, which seeks to describe society by its lack of structure, or fragmentation.

=== Functionalism ===
Functionalists seek an objective understanding of the social world. They have a more positivist view of social science, believing objective results can be obtained by techniques like surveys and interviews. They discount the inherent bias of the intellectual, believing their results are value-free. Functionalism grew from the work of Max Weber and Émile Durkheim. Functionalism was popular in the US during the period from 1930 to 1960. Humanistic sociology had a role in the decline of functionalism. This can be seen in the rise of later models which returned to a focus of the subjective nature of human experience, for example, the later popularity of post-modern thinking highlighting the subjective basis of semantics. Humanistic sociology also differentiates itself from functionalism in promoting the need for freedom of thinking in the practices of research. Functionalists reject the idea of a realist or structural analysis, seeking instead a more observable explanation with external validation outside the social system.

=== Structural functionalism ===
Some functionalists actually regard themselves as proponents of structural functionalism. Structural functionalism is close to humanistic sociology in its understanding of society as shared norms and values. Structural functionalism arose from functionalism in the attempt to explain the dominance of some social groups over others, known as conflict theory. Conflict theory contradicts functionalism. Structural functionalism is usually associated with the work of Talcott Parsons. Again humanistic sociology had a role in the decline of structural functionalism. In the humanistic model, there exist dynamical systems of values obtained from social actions in an evolutionary sense.

=== Symbolic interactionism ===
Many will claim that symbolic interactionism has grown directly from the work of Thomas and Znaniecki. Symbolic interactionism grew out of structural functionalism. Symbolic interactionism views society as consisting of interactions among individuals. Hence the focus on individuals and the organization and patterns found in their everyday activities. It seeks to deal with problems like identity. Problems found in symbolic interactionism, such as inadequate analysis of social structure, led to a fork in the road of social science. The school of sociology most influenced by the humanistic model developed by Znaniecki and Thomas led to the development of ethnomethodology. The other branch led to post-modernism via poststructuralism.

=== Ethnomethodology ===
Ethnomethodology and the social anthropology of Pierre Bourdieu are probably the best representation of the initial work of Znaniecki and his model of culture as a system of values. In a sense humanistic sociology has transcended the structure vs function debate, focusing instead on the value-based world of culture. A researcher working as a humanistic sociologist has a scientific objectification of values. Using analytic induction in the context of the humanistic coefficient, not unduly influenced by questions of structure or function, an objective order for the social world is found. That the character of this social world is derived from sociological sources does not discount a scientific conclusion. A humanistic sociologist models the experience of humanity as the span of social action. A humanistic sociologist derives a dual structure for this space from axiological constructions mapped by symbolic expressions. A humanistic sociologist will follow the path pointed to by Znaniecki and reject the naturalistic view.

=== Post-modernism ===
Post-modernism, by its emphasis on subjectivity, implies that no one set of values is any better than any other (This is criticised by some as moral relativism). It is however quite possible to equate a scientific analysis of value systems with post-modernism. The analysis of globalisation is one such application of the analysis within post-modernism. By a focus on the subjective nature of experience, a humanistic sociologist can be a post-modern thinker. However a humanistic sociologist has core values and beliefs with which it is possible to assign a positive or negative evaluation to a value, for example, the priority of the "inner dignity of man". Just as in the practices of humanistic research or humanistic social work, a value is positive to the extent that it leads to creative and constructive social activity. It is therefore wrong to equate post-modernism with humanistic sociology, which above all seeks an irreducible representation of the human world.

== See also ==
- Education in Poland during World War II
- Verstehen
- Humanity & Society
- Association for Humanist Sociology
