= Life course approach =

Theory for analyzing people's lives

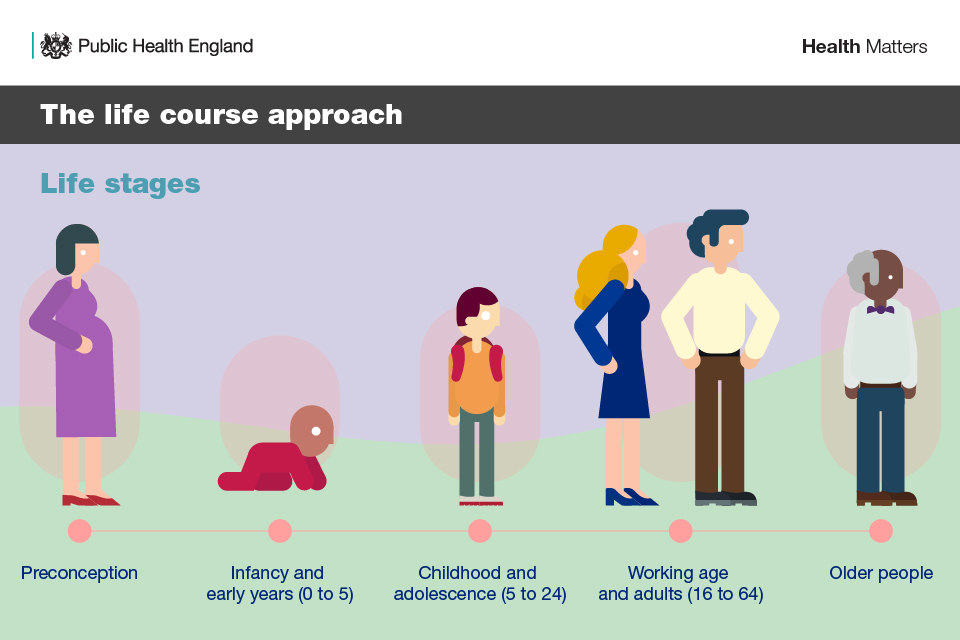
The life course approach

The life course approach, also known as the life course perspective or life course theory, refers to an approach developed in the 1960s for analyzing people's lives within structural, social, and cultural contexts. It views one's life as a socially sequenced timeline and recognizes the importance of factors such as generational succession and age in shaping behavior and career. Development does not end at childhood, but instead extends through multiple life stages to influence life trajectory.

The origins of this approach can be traced back to pioneering studies of the 1920s such as William I. Thomas and Florian Znaniecki's The Polish Peasant in Europe and America and Karl Mannheim's essay on the "Problem of Generations".

== Overview ==
The life course approach examines an individual's life history and investigates, for example, how early events influenced future decisions and events such as marriage and divorce, engagement in crime, or disease incidence. The primary factor promoting standardization of the life course was improvement in mortality rates brought about by the management of contagious and infectious diseases such as smallpox. A life course is defined as "a sequence of socially defined events and roles that the individual enacts over time". In particular, the approach focuses on the connection between individuals and the historical and socioeconomic context in which these individuals lived. The method encompasses observations including history, sociology, demography, developmental psychology, biology, public health and economics. So far, empirical research from a life course perspective has not resulted in the development of a formal theory.

Glen Elder theorized the life course as based on five key principles: life-span development, human agency, historical time and geographic place, timing of decisions, and linked lives. As a concept, a life course is defined as "a sequence of socially defined events and roles that the individual enacts over time" (Giele and Elder 1998, p. 22). These events and roles do not necessarily proceed in a given sequence, but rather constitute the sum total of the person's actual experience. Thus, the concept of life course implies age-differentiated social phenomena distinct from uniform life-cycle stages and the life span. Life span refers to the duration of life and characteristics that are closely related to age, but that vary little across time and place.

In contrast, the life course perspective elaborates the importance of time, context, process, and meaning on human development and family life (Bengtson and Allen 1993). The family is perceived as a micro social group within a macro social context—a "collection of individuals with shared history who interact within ever-changing social contexts across ever increasing [sic] time and space" (Bengtson and Allen 1993, p. 470). Aging and developmental change, therefore, are continuous processes that are experienced throughout life. As such, the life course reflects the intersection of social and historical factors with personal biography and development, within which the study of family life and social change can take place (Elder 1985; Hareven 1996).

Life course theory has also moved in a constructionist direction. Rather than taking time, sequence, and linearity for granted, in their book Constructing the Life Course, Jaber F. Gubrium and James A. Holstein (2000) take their point of departure from accounts of experience through time. This shifts the figure and ground of experience and its stories, foregrounding how time, sequence, linearity, and related concepts are used in everyday life. It presents a radical turn in understanding experience through time, moving well beyond the notion of a multidisciplinary paradigm, providing an altogether different paradigm from traditional time-centered approaches. Rather than concepts of time being the principal building blocks of propositions, concepts of time are analytically bracketed and become focal topics of research and constructive understanding.

The life course approach has been applied to topics such as the occupational health of immigrants, and retirement age. It has also become increasingly important in other areas such as in the role of childhood experiences affecting the behaviour of students later in life or physical activity in old age.
