= Culturalism =

Central importance of culture as an organizing force in human affairs

In philosophy and sociology, culturalism is the central importance of culture as an organizing force in human affairs. It is also described as an ontological approach that seeks to eliminate simple binaries between seemingly opposing phenomena such as nature and culture.

== Origins ==
Florian Znaniecki (1882–1958) was a Polish-American philosopher and sociologist. Znaniecki's culturalism was based on philosophies and theories of Matthew Arnold (Culture and Anarchy), Friedrich Nietzsche (voluntarism), Henri Bergson (creative evolutionism), Wilhelm Dilthey (philosophy of life), William James, John Dewey (pragmatism) and Ferdinand C. Schiller (humanism). He synthesized their theses and developed an original humanistic stance, which was first presented in Cultural Reality.

Znaniecki's philosophy favored the advantages of rational, systematic knowledge. He also attempted to reconcile the threads of the phenomenological and pragmatic views to counter naturalism. Aside from naturalism, Znaniecki was critical of a number of then-prevalent philosophical viewpoints: intellectualism, idealism, realism, and rationalism. He was also critical of irrationalism and intuitionism. His criticisms became the bases of a new theoretical framework in the form of culturalism.

== Characteristics ==
Znaniecki's "culturalism" was an ontological and epistemological approach aiming to eliminate dualisms such as the belief that nature and culture are opposite realities.

This approach allowed him to "define social phenomena in cultural terms". Znaniecki was arguing for the importance of culture, noting that our culture shapes our view of the world and our thinking. Znaniecki notes that while the world is composed of physical artifacts, we are not really capable of studying the physical world other than through the lenses of culture.

Among the fundamental aspects of the philosophy of culturalism are two categories: value and action. Elżbieta Hałas, who calls it an "antithesis to the intellectual dogmas of naturalism", identifies the following assumptions:

- "The subject-object dualism must be overcome and thought should be united with reality."
- "Reality is not an absolute order but changes in a creative evolution."
- "All images of the world are relative."
- "It is false to oppose nature and culture or to subordinate culture to nature."
- "Value is the most general category of the description of reality."

Znaniecki's philosophy of culturalism laid the foundation for his larger theoretical system, based around another concept of his, "humanistic coefficient." Though originally a philosophical concept, culturalism was further developed by Znaniecki to inform his sociological theories.

Znaniecki's culturalism influenced modern sociological views of antipositivism and antinaturalism.

== Sources ==
- Dulczewski, Zygmunt (1984). Florian Znaniecki: życie i dzieło (in Polish). Wydawnictwo Poznańskie. ISBN 978-83-210-0482-2.
- Hałas, Elżbieta (2010). Towards the World Culture Society: Florian Znaniecki's Culturalism. Peter Lang. ISBN 978-3-631-59946-4.
- Sztompka, Piotr (2002). Socjologia: Analiza społeczeństwa. Znak. ISBN 978-83-240-0218-4.
