= Florian Znaniecki =

Polish and American philosopher and sociologist (1882–1958)

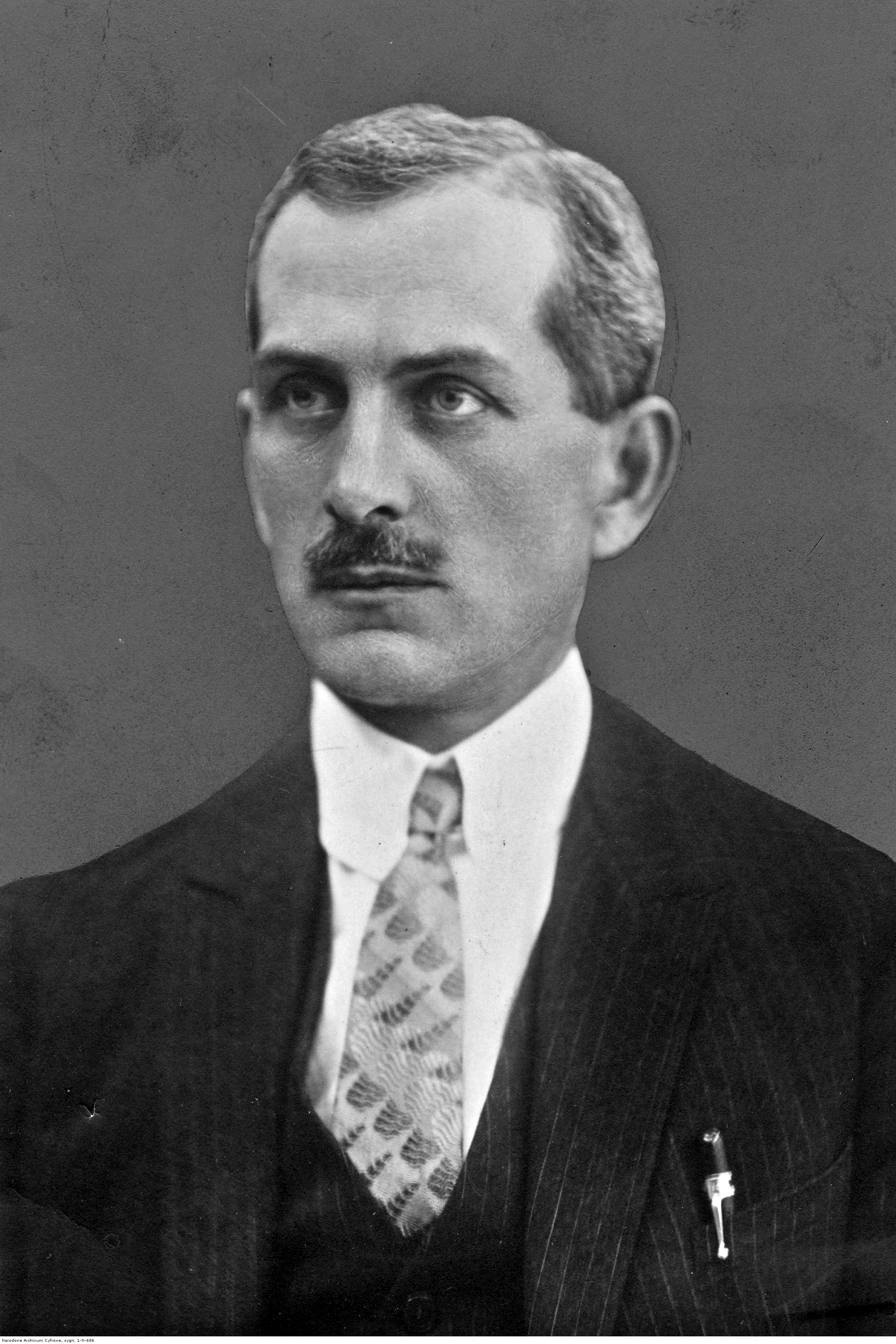
- Born: 15 January 1882; Świątniki, Congress Poland
- Died: 23 March 1958 (aged 76); Champaign, Illinois, U.S.
- Education: Jagiellonian University (Kraków)
- Known for: Contributions to logology The Polish Peasant in Europe and America; Humanistic coefficient Culturalism
- Children: Helena Znaniecki Lopata
- Scientific career
- Fields: Sociology
- Workplaces: Adam Mickiewicz University (Poznań), Columbia University, University of Illinois at Urbana-Champaign

Florian Witold Znaniecki (Polish: [znaˈɲɛt͡skʲi]; 15 January 1882 – 23 March 1958) was a Polish-born American philosopher and sociologist who taught and wrote in Poland and in the United States. Over the course of his work, he shifted his focus from philosophy to sociology. He remains a major figure in the history of Polish and American sociology; the founder of Polish academic sociology, and of an entire school of thought in sociology.

He won international renown as co-author, with William I. Thomas, of the study, The Polish Peasant in Europe and America (1918–1920), which is considered the foundation of modern empirical sociology. He also made major contributions to sociological theory, introducing terms such as "humanistic coefficient" and "culturalism".

In Poland, he established the first Polish department of sociology at Adam Mickiewicz University, where he worked from 1920 to 1939. His career in the US began at the University of Chicago (1917 to 1919) and continued at Columbia University (1932 to 1934 and 1939 to 1940) and at the University of Illinois at Urbana-Champaign (1942 to 1950).

He was the 44th President of the American Sociological Association (for the year 1954).

== Life ==
=== Childhood and education ===
Florian Znaniecki was born on 15 January 1882 at Świątniki, Congress Poland, a state controlled by the Russian Empire to Leon Znaniecki and Amelia, née Holtz. He received early schooling from tutors, then attended secondary schools at Warsaw and Częstochowa. While in secondary school, he was a member of an underground study group, specializing in history, literature and philosophy. His secondary-school grades were average at best, and he had to repeat a year of school; this was largely due to his extracurricular interest in Polish-language study, which was banned under the Russified school program. As a youth, he wrote some poetry, including a drama, Cheops (1903). A poem of his, "Do Prometeusza" ("To Prometheus"), was included in a 1900 anthology; however, neither he in later life, nor literary critics, judged his poetry outstanding.

He entered the Imperial University of Warsaw in 1902, but was soon expelled after taking part in protests against the Russian administration's curtailment of student rights. Threatened with conscription into the Imperial Russian Army, he chose to emigrate, and in early 1904 he left Warsaw for Switzerland.

During that period, he was briefly an editor at a French-language literary magazine, Nice Illustrée (late 1904 – early 1905); faked his own death; briefly served in the French Foreign Legion in Algeria; and worked at a flea market, on a farm, in a traveling circus, and as a librarian at the Polish Museum in Rapperswil, Switzerland.

In Switzerland, he soon resumed his university studies, first at the University of Geneva (1905–1907), then at the University of Zurich (1907–1908), eventually transferring to the Sorbonne in Paris, France (1908–1909), where he attended lectures by sociologist Émile Durkheim. In 1909, after the death of his supervisor Frédéric Rauh, he returned to Poland, where in 1910 he obtained his PhD degree at Jagiellonian University, in Kraków, under a new supervisor, Maurycy Straszewski.

=== Early Polish career ===
That year he also joined the Polish Psychological Society, in which he would be highly active over the next few years, becoming its vice president in 1913–1914. Much of his early academic work at that time could be classified as philosophy. In 1909, aged 27, he published his first academic paper, Etyka filozoficzna i nauka o wartościach moralnych ("Philosophical Ethics and the Science of Moral Values"); a year later, he published Zagadnienie wartości w filozofii (The Question of Values in Philosophy), based on his doctoral dissertation, and a paper, Myśl i rzeczywistosc ("Mind and Reality"). In 1912, he published a new book, Humanizm i Poznanie (Humanism and Knowledge), and a paper, Elementy rzeczywistości praktycznej ("Elements of Practical Reality"). A year later, he published an annotated translation of Henri Bergson's Creative Evolution and a paper, Znaczenie rozwoju świata i człowieka ("The Meaning of World and Human Development"). The year 1914 saw the publication of his papers, Formy i zasady twórczości moralnej ("Forms and Principles of Moral Creativity") and Zasada względności jako podstawa filozofii ("The Principle of Relativity as a Foundation of Philosophy"). His works, published in Polish, were well received by the Polish scholarly community and intelligentsia.

Due to his past political activism, he was unable to secure a post at a major university. From 1912 to 1914, he lectured at a novel women's institution of higher education, the Advanced Pedagogical Courses for Women. During his studies, he had worked at several European institutions dealing with Polish immigrants; he would build on his experiences by becoming involved with the Warsaw-based Society for the Welfare of Émigrés (Towarzystwo Opieki nad Wychodźcami), where he worked in 1910–1914. By 1911, he was the Society's director and (1911–1912) editor of its journal, Wychodźca Polski (The Polish Émigré). Znaniecki became an expert on Polish migration, in 1914 authoring for the government a 500-page report, Wychodźtwo Sezonowe (Seasonal Migration).

=== Work with Thomas ===
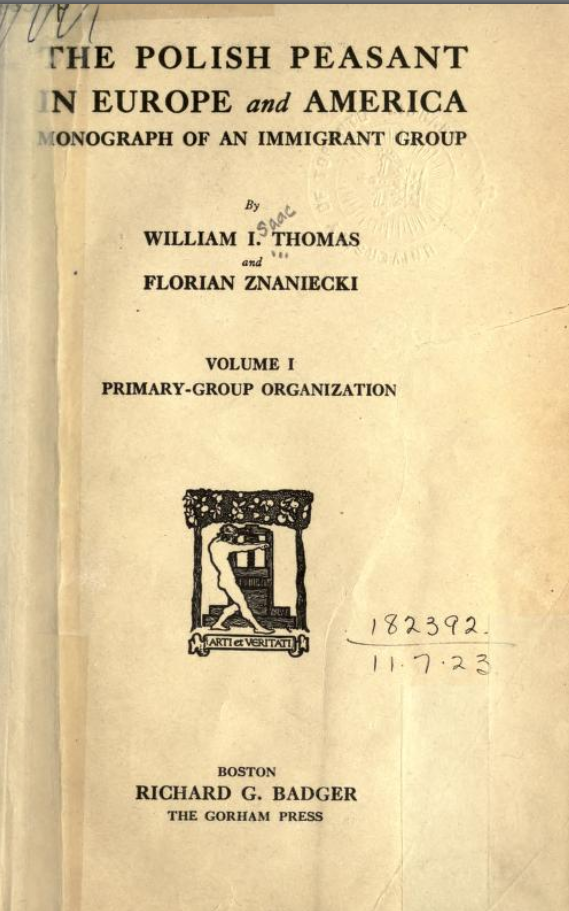
Volume I (1918) of The Polish Peasant in Europe and America, Zaniecki's most famous work written during his first U.S. stay

A year earlier, in 1913, Znaniecki had met William I. Thomas, an American sociologist who had come to Poland in connection with his research on Polish immigrants in the United States. Thomas and Znaniecki had begun to collaborate, and soon Thomas invited Znaniecki to come to Chicago to continue work with him in the United States. In July 1914, just on the eve of World War I, Znaniecki left Poland to work with Thomas as a research assistant. From 1917 to 1919, Znaniecki also lectured in sociology at the University of Chicago.

Their work culminated in co-authoring of The Polish Peasant in Europe and America (1918–1920), considered a sociology classic. It was his collaboration with Thomas that marked the transition in Znaniecki's career from philosopher to sociologist. Znaniecki stayed with Thomas in Chicago until mid-1919, when he moved to New York, following Thomas, who had lost his job at Chicago due to a spurious scandal.

That year Znaniecki published a new book, still mostly philosophical rather than sociological, Cultural Reality. Published in English, it was a synthesis of his philosophical thought. In New York, Thomas and Znaniecki carried on research for the Carnegie Corporation on the process of immigrant Americanization. Znaniecki contributed to Thomas' book, Old World Traits Transplanted, and published an anonymous solicited article on that topic in the February 1920 Atlantic Monthly.

=== Founding Polish sociology ===
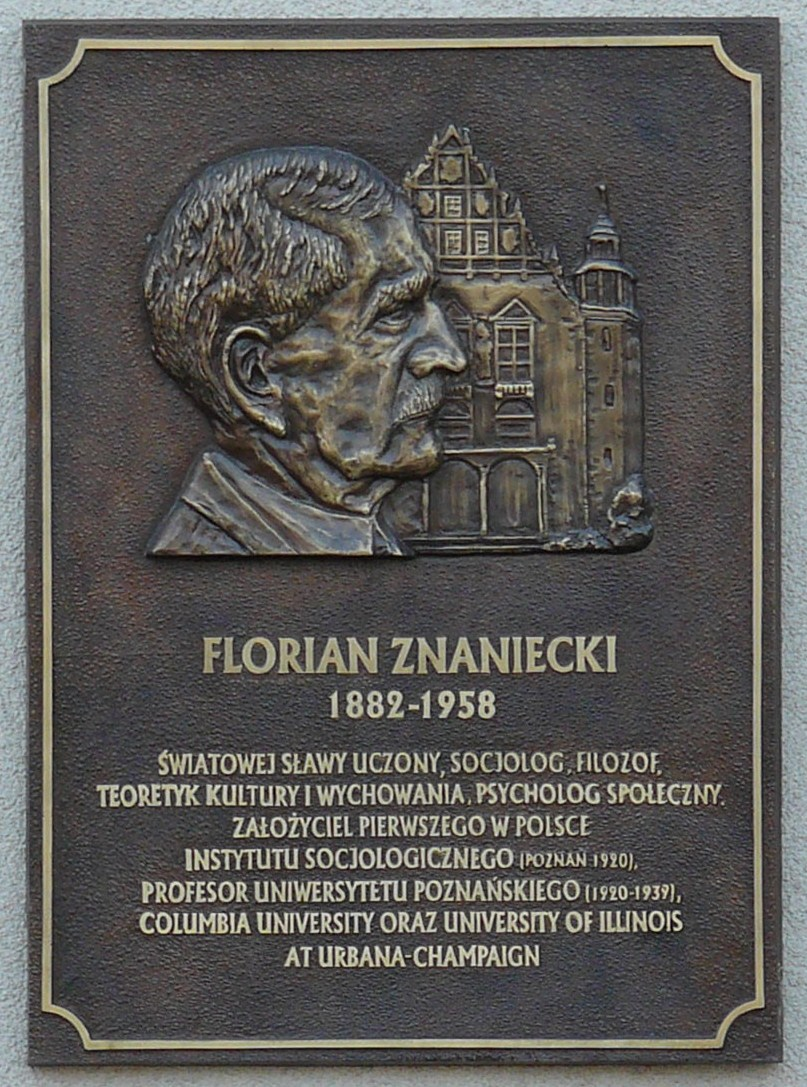
Florian Znaniecki plaque, Adam Mickiewicz University in Poznań

Poland had regained independence in 1918, following World War I. In 1919, Znaniecki contacted the newly founded Ministry of Religious Affairs and Public Education, offering to return to Poland if the Ministry could help him secure a chair at a Polish university. He proposed creating a novel Institute of Sociology, but bureaucracy and communication delays resulted in that idea being shelved, and he was offered a philosophy professorship at the newly organized Adam Mickiewicz University in Poznań.

In 1920, Znaniecki returned to the newly established Second Polish Republic, where at Poznań University he soon became Poland's first chair in sociology. He accomplished this by renaming the department, originally "Third Philosophical Department", to "Department of Sociology and Cultural Philosophy", doing the same for his chair, and establishing a Sociological Seminary. That same year he also founded the Polish Institute of Sociology (Polski Instytut Socjologiczny), the fifth-oldest sociological institute in Europe.

In 1927, his department was officially renamed to "department of sociology", and in 1930, the department gained authorization to issue degrees in sociology. Also in 1930, the Polish Institute of Sociology began publishing the first Polish sociological journal, Przegląd Socjologiczny (The Sociological Review), with Znaniecki its chief editor from 1930 to 1939. That year, the Institute organized Poland's first academic sociologists' conference. Due to his role as founder of so many of its building blocks, Znaniecki is considered as one of the fathers of sociology in Poland.

=== Later U.S. career ===
Keeping in touch with American sociologists, Znaniecki lectured as a visiting professor at Columbia University in New York City in 1932–34 and during the summer of 1939. That summer ended the Polish stage of his career, as the invasion of Poland and the start of World War II prevented his return to Poland. He was already aboard a ship bound for Poland when his travel was cut short in the United Kingdom. He still briefly considered returning to Poland, where his wife and daughter remained; however, faced with the occupation, he returned to the United States in 1940. His wife and daughter, after briefly being imprisoned in a Nazi concentration camp, joined him.

With help from American colleagues, Znaniecki obtained an extension of his appointment at Columbia University through mid-1940. He then moved to the University of Illinois at Urbana-Champaign and in 1942, obtained American citizenship, allowing him to transition from a visiting to a regular professorship. He taught at the University of Illinois until his retirement, deciding not to return to the communist Polish People's Republic, established in the aftermath of World War II, despite the offer of a chair at Poznań University. In 1950, he retired, becoming a professor emeritus.

He was 44th President of the American Sociological Association (for 1954). His presidential address, "Basic Problems of Contemporary Sociology," was delivered on September 8, 1954 at the Association's annual meeting and was later published in the American Sociological Review.

He died on March 23, 1958 in Champaign, Illinois. The cause of death was arteriosclerosis. His funeral took place on March 26, and he was buried at Roselawn Champaign Cemetery.

== Family ==
In 1906, Znaniecki married a fellow Polish student at the University of Geneva, Emilia Szwejkowska. They had a son, poet and writer Juliusz Znaniecki, born in 1908. Emilia died in 1915.

The next year, Znaniecki married Eileen Markley (1886–1976). They had one daughter, sociologist Helena Znaniecki Lopata, born in 1925.

== Importance ==
Polish sociologist and historian of ideas Jerzy Szacki writes that Znaniecki's major contributions include: the founding of sociology in Poland; his work in empirical sociology; and his work in sociological theory. Szacki notes that Znaniecki sought to bridge a number of gaps: between empirical sociology and more theoretical approaches; between objectivity and subjectivity; between humanistic and naturalistic methodologies and viewpoints; and between American and European intellectual traditions.

Szacki writes that, while Znaniecki's theoretical contributions were subsequently pushed into the background by Talcott Parsons' "functionalism", Znaniecki offered the most ambitious sociological theory known to America before Parsons.

Znaniecki's most famous work remains The Polish Peasant in Europe and America (1918–1920), co-authored with William I. Thomas. His other major works include Wstęp do socjologii (An Introduction to Sociology, 1922), The Method of Sociology (1934), Social Actions (1936), The Social Role of the Man of Knowledge (1940) and Cultural Sciences (1952).

== Themes ==
=== Empirical sociology ===
Znaniecki's contributions to empirical sociology began after, and were influenced by, his collaboration with William I. Thomas. The Polish Peasant in Europe and America (1918–1920), a five-volume work which he wrote with Thomas, is considered a classic of empirical sociology. It is a study of Polish immigrants to America, based on personal documents. The work became a landmark study of Americanization — of how new immigrants to the United States "become Americans".

This work represents Znaniecki's most valued contribution to empirical sociology. Most of his other works focused on theory, the only other notable exception being Miasto w świadomości jego obywateli (The City in the Consciousness of its Citizens, 1931).

=== Sociology: theory and definition ===
A key element of Znaniecki's sociological theory is his view of sociology in particular, and of the social sciences in general, as a scientific field uniquely different from the natural sciences. Znaniecki defines sociology as a study of social actions. His recommended methodology was analytic induction: analysis of typical case studies, and generalization from them.

Znaniecki's theories form a major part of sociology's action theory, and his work is a major part of the foundation of humanistic sociology. Another term connected with Znaniecki's theories is "systematic sociology" ("socjologia systematyczna"). He sought to create a grand sociological theory, one that would bridge the gap between empirical sociology and more theoretical approaches.

Znaniecki criticized the widespread definition of sociology as the study of society. In Znaniecki's culturalist perspective, sociology is a study of culture (though it is not the study of culture, as Znaniecki recognized that other social sciences also study culture). His definition of sociology has been described as that of "a cultural science whose function is to study systems of social interaction based upon patterns of values and norms of behaviour, through the use of the humanistic coefficient", or more simply, "the investigation of organized, interdependent interaction among human beings." The part of the culture that sociology focused on was that of social relation or interaction.

Znaniecki saw culture as a field separate from nature, but also from individuals' perceptions. The essence of culture is socially constructed objects. He was one of the first sociologists to begin analyzing personal documents such as letters, autobiographies, diaries, and the like. He considered the analysis of such documents an important part of the humanistic-coefficient method.

Znaniecki saw sociology as an objective, inductive and generalizing science. According to Szacki, Znaniecki viewed sociology as a nomothetic science that should be able to use a methodology similar to that of the natural sciences (however, Znaniecki's daughter Helena Znaniecki Lopata, in her introduction to Social Relations and Social Roles, contradicts Szacki, writing that, for Znaniecki, sociology was a science "whose subject matter calls for a method different from that of the natural sciences."). In 1934 he formulated the principle of analytic induction, designed to identify universal propositions and causal laws. He contrasted it with enumerative research, which provided mere correlations and could not account for exceptions in statistical relationships. He was also critical of the statistical method, which he did not see as very useful.

In addition to the science of sociology, Znaniecki was also deeply interested in the larger field of the sociology of science. He analyzed the social roles of scientists, and the concept of a school of thought.

=== Four social systems ===
According to Znaniecki, sociology can be divided into the study of four dynamic social systems: social action theory, social relation theory, social actors theory, and social groups theory. Znaniecki saw social actions as the foundation of a society, as they give rise to more complex social relations, and he saw this theory as the foundation of all the others. Unlike Max Weber, he did not believe that everything can be reduced to social actions; he was also quite skeptical of any insights coming from the science of psychology, which he held in low esteem.

The four major forms of cooperative interaction, or four social systems, in growing complexity, were:

- social actions (in Polish, "czyny społeczne" or "czynności społeczne"): the most basic type of social fact;
- social relations (in Polish, "stosunki społeczne"): these require at least two persons and a mutual obligation; the study of social relations is the study of norms regulating social actions;
- social personalities (in Polish, "osoby społeczne" or "osobowości społeczne"): the combined picture that emerges from a number of different social roles that an individual has;
- social group (in Polish, "grupa społeczna"): any group which is recognized by some as a separate entity; Znaniecki saw a society as a group of groups, but denied it primacy as an area that the sociologist should focus on (while at the same time recognizing that most sociologists differed on this).

The four-category division described above appeared in his 1934 book, The Method of Sociology. By 1958 he had reformulated the division, and was speaking instead of social relations, social roles, social groups, and societies.

=== Sociology of culture ===
Znaniecki coined the term "humanistic coefficient" for a method of social research by way of data analysis that emphasizes participants' perceptions of the experience being analyzed. The humanistic coefficient sees all social facts as being created by social actors and as being understandable only from their perspective. Thus the sociologist ought to study reality by trying to understand how others see the world, not (objectively) as an independent observer; in other words, the scientist needs to understand the subject's world. While some have criticized this approach as being too close to subjectivism, Znaniecki himself saw it as anti-subjectivist; he observed that social facts such as cultural systems can exist even if no one perceives their existence. He was also skeptical of any value coming from personal, subjective observations, arguing that such observations have value only if they can be objectively described. He argued that the difference between the natural and social sciences lies not in the difference between objective and subjective experiences, but in the subject being studied: for Znaniecki, the natural sciences studied things, and the social sciences studied cultural values.

Znaniecki characterized the world as being caught within two contrary modes of reflection; idealism and realism. He proposed a third way, which he called "culturalism". His culturalism was one of the founding ideas of modern antipositivist and antinaturalist sociology. The term "culturalism" was introduced into English in his book, Cultural Reality (1919), and was translated into Polish as "kulturalizm"; previously Znaniecki had discussed the concept in Polish as "humanism" ("humanizm").

Elżbieta Hałas has insisted on a gradual evolution of Znaniecki's sociology of culture from Cultural Reality to Cultural Sciences, his most reviewed book, which was published more than thirty years later, in 1952. By that time, Znaniecki saw the cultural order as "axionormative", a universal concept encompassing “relationships among all kind of human actions” and the corresponding values. Hałas noted that this approach put him at odds with what was the dominant approach of the sociology of culture in the 1950s, whose most authoritative exponents were Americans who regarded Znaniecki's approach as typically European and hardly applicable to the analysis of culture in the United States.

=== Other themes ===
Znaniecki's work also touched on many other areas of sociology, such as intergroup conflict, urban sociology, and rural sociology.

== Works ==
Znaniecki's first academic works, of the 1910s, were more philosophical than sociological in nature; beginning in the 1920s, his works were primarily sociological. His Cultural Reality (1919) was a synthesis of his philosophical thought, but the simultaneous publication of his much more popular The Polish Peasant in Europe and America (1918–1920) associated his name in academic circles primarily with sociology rather than with philosophy. His early works focused on analysis of culture and strongly criticized the principles of sociological naturalism. Szacki notes a puzzling gap in Znaniecki's research: while he was well-read in, and engaged with, most previous and current theories, he largely ignored the works of some notable sociologists of his time such as Max Weber, Vilfredo Pareto and Talcott Parsons. On the other hand, his works engaged closely with those of William I. Thomas, Georg Simmel, Robert E. Park, and Émile Durkheim.

His The Method of Sociology first introduced his concept of divisions within subfields of sociology. His most notable works included two books published in the same year (1952): Modern Nationalities, and Cultural Sciences. The former is an analysis of the evolution of national-culture societies, and the latter presents a theoretical study of the relation between sociology and other sciences. Znaniecki never finished his magnum opus, Systematic Sociology, which would eventually be collected and published posthumously in its unfinished but final form as Social Relations and Social Roles: The Unfinished Systematic Sociology (1965).

=== List of works ===
Roughly half of Znaniecki's published works are in English; the rest are in Polish.

In English:

Books

- — (March 1915). "The Principle of Relativity and Philosophical Absolutism". The Philosophical Review. 24 (2): 150–64. doi:10.2307/2178231. JSTOR 2178231. OCLC 8866729491.
- ——; Thomas, William Isaac (1918). The Polish Peasant in Europe and America; Monograph of an Immigrant Group. Vol. 1–5. Chicago: Univ. of Chicago Pr. OCLC 836885922.
- — (1919). Cultural Reality. Chicago: Univ. of Chicago Pr. OCLC 760620.
- — (1925). The Laws of Social Psychology. Chicago; Poznań printed: University Press. OCLC 504734676.
- — (1931). "Group Crises Produced by Voluntary Undertakings". In Young, Kimball (ed.). Social Attitudes. New York: H. Holt and Co. pp. 265–290.
- — (1934). The Method of Sociology. New York: Rinehart & Company. OCLC 630583357.
- — (1936). Social Actions. New York: Farrar & Rinehart. OCLC 247403190.
- — (1940). The Social Role of the Man of Knowledge. New York: Columbia University Press. doi:10.1037/14902-000.
- — (1952). Cultural Sciences, Their Origin and Development. Urbana: University of Illinois Press. OCLC 165463.
- — (1952). Modern Nationalities: A Sociological Study. Urbana: University of Illinois Press. OCLC 504434617.
- — (1965). Social Relations and Social Roles: The Unfinished Systematic Sociology. San Francisco, CA: Chandler Publishing. OCLC 750525343.
- — (1969). Bierstedt, Robert (ed.). On Humanistic Sociology: Selected Papers. Chicago: Univ. of Chicago Pr. ISBN 978-0-226-98842-9.
- — (1994). The Social Role of the University Student. Sociological monographs. Poznań: Wydawnictwo Nakom. ISBN 978-83-85060-70-3.

Articles

- — (1932). The Analysis of Social Processes. Twenty-seventh Annual Meeting. Vol. 26. Publications of the American Sociological Society: Papers and Proceedings. pp. 37–43. OCLC 836884574.
- — (1948). "William I. Thomas as a Collaborator". Sociology and Social Research. 32: 765–767.

In Polish:

- Zagadnienie wartości w filozofii (The Question of Value in Philosophy), Warsaw, 1910.
- Humanizm i poznanie (Humanism and Knowledge), Warsaw, 1912.
- Upadek cywilizacji zachodniej: Szkic z pogranicza filozofii kultury i socjologii (The Decline of Western Civilization: A Sketch from the Interface of Cultural Philosophy and Sociology), Poznań, 1921.
- Wstęp do socjologii (An Introduction to Sociology), Poznań, 1922.
- — (1982) [1923]. "Przedmiot i zadania nauki o wiedzy (in Polish)" [The Subject Matter and Tasks of the Science of Knowledge]. In Walentynowicz, Bohdan (ed.). Polish Contributions to the Science of Science. Translated by Kasparek, Christopher. Dordrecht, Holland: D. Reidel Publishing Company. pp. 1–81. ISBN 83-01-03607-9. "Znaniecki proposes the founding of a new empirically based science which would study science itself, and which he terms "the science of knowledge"; Znaniecki's proposed meta-science has since been called by various other names, including "the science of science", "the sociology of science", and "logology"."
- Socjologia wychowania (The Sociology of Education), Warsaw (vol. I: 1928; vol. II: 1930).
- Miasto w świadomości jego obywateli (The City in the Consciousness of Its Citizens), Poznań, 1931.
- Ludzie teraźniejsi a cywilizacja przyszłości (Contemporary People and the Civilization of the Future), Lwów, 1934.

== Commemoration ==
Florian Znaniecki has been commemorated in numerous academic initiatives and public spaces. Streets in Warsaw (in 1982) and Poznań (in 1984) were named after him, as was the Znaniecki College of Adam Mickiewicz University in Poznań (in 2010). At that university, two commemorative plaques were unveiled, one at the Collegium Novum (in 1972) and second one at the Znaniecki College (in 2010). In 2000, a commemorative plaque was also placed on the church in his hometown of Świątniki, and his sculptural head is located at the Staszic Palace in Warsaw.

Named after his is also Florian Znaniecki Prize awarded since the 1970s by the Polish Sociological Association for the best master's theses in sociology. Popularizing his scientific achievements is one of the main goals of organizations such as the Florian Znaniecki Scientific Foundation (Fundacja Naukowa, founded in 1989), the Florian Znaniecki Scientific Society (Towarzystwo Naukowe, founded in 1992), and the Florian Znaniecki Center for Social Thought (Centrum Myśli Społecznej, existing in 2014–2018). In 1994, the Polish Post issued a postage stamp with his image.

Outside Poland, the University of Illinois at Urbana-Champaign has the Znaniecki Publication Prize, awarded to doctoral students since 2009, and the university has also used honorary title of Florian Znaniecki Professorial Scholar for newly hired researchers.

== See also ==
- History of philosophy in Poland § 20th century
- List of Polish people § Social sciences
- Sociology in Poland
