= Humanity & Society =

- Discipline: Sociology
- Language: English
- Edited by: Dresden Lackey, Cameron Lippard

Publication details
- Former names: Humanity and Society
- History: 1977–present
- Publisher: SAGE Publications on behalf of the Association for Humanist Sociology (United States)
- Frequency: Quarterly

Standard abbreviations
- ISO 4: Humanity Soc.

Indexing
- ISSN: 0160-5976 (print); 2372-9708 (web)
- LCCN: 78640820
- OCLC no.: 779578500

Links
- Journal homepage; Online access; Online archive; Journal page on association's website

Humanity & Society is a quarterly peer-reviewed academic journal published by SAGE Publications, and is the official journal of the Association for Humanist Sociology (AHS). Established in 1977, the journal covers all aspects of sociology while focusing on issues of injustice, human suffering and social activism from a humanist point of view. The editors-in-chief are Dresden Lackey (Wofford College) and Cameron Lippard (Appalachian State).

The journal awards an annual Distinguished Paper Award to "the article that has contributed most effectively to the advancement of empirical, methodological, and/or theoretical research in humanist sociology."

An associated publication, The Humanist Sociologist, serves as a newsletter and features shorter reports and opinion pieces.

== Background and history ==
At the 1976 annual meeting of the American Sociological Association (ASA), the founding organizational meeting of the Association for Humanist Sociology was held. The president of the ASA, Alfred McClung Lee, having run into resistance against his efforts to reform the ASA, organized the formation of the AHS to be distinct and outside of the structure of the ASA. The first issue of The Humanist Sociologist newsletter was published later that year, and the first issue of the Humanity & Society journal was published in 1977, the only issue published that year. Beginning in 1978, the journal was published quarterly.

With the journal's focus outside of mainstream sociology, article themes have included "human liberation", "unity and coalition building", "analysis of oppression and inequality", "studies of specific minority and disadvantaged minority groups" and "social change".

The journal would also inform potential contributors that, "authors of articles will be asked to include information as to the primary moral and/or value commitments, as well as their commitments to any particular sociological paradigm ... [and] 'domain assumptions' that undergird their analyses."

The first editor of the journal was sociologist Charles P. Flynn. Although Al and Betty Lee never exercised control or edited the journal, it reflected their concern for issues of injustice, human suffering and social activism. The quarterly The Humanist Sociologist newsletter was initially developed and edited by Richard H.Wells.

A review of the first two years of Humanity & Society published in the Contemporary Sociology journal described how it seeks "to redraw the domain of sociological discourse, theoretically, philosophically, substantively, or ethically. They challenge the status quo and the dominant tendency of current publications. Thus they are more difficult to evaluate by conventional standards." According to this review, the journal and a couple journals like it show that the field of humanistic and interactionist sociology are active fields of inquiry, after neglect on the part of the major journals in sociology. The journal was described as having opened up previously restricted channels for qualitative sociologists to publish their empirical work.

== See also ==
- The Society for the Study of Social Problems
- Humanist sociology
