= Humanistic coefficient =

Method of conducting social research

A humanistic coefficient (Polish: współczynnik humanistyczny) is a conceptual object, methodological principle, or method of conducting social research wherein data analysis stresses the perceived import of analyzed experiences to their participants. The term was coined by Polish sociologist Florian Znaniecki.

Znaniecki coined the term in Polish in his Wstęp do socjologii (Introduction to Sociology, 1922) and translated it into English as "humanistic coefficient" in his book, The Object-Matter of Sociology (1927).

== Definitions ==
Grossly and simply speaking, the humanistic coefficient is the difference between trying to describe or explain social facts as if they were purely physical phenomena, or doing it instead by taking into account the culture of the folk or milieu in which those facts happen.

In Znaniecki's own words: "an observer of cultural life can understand the data observed only if taken with the "humanistic coefficient", only if he does not limit his observation to his own direct experience of the data but reconstructs the experience and the data in the social context of the people involved". Elsewhere he wrote: "This essential character of cultural data we call the humanistic coefficient, because such data, as objects of the student's theoretic reflection, already belong to somebody's else's experience and are such as this active experience makes them."

Piotr Sztompka defines the humanistic coefficient as "a connection that exists between each social fact and actions and experiences of particular individuals, and the resulting need for those facts to be studied from specific perspective that requires the research to place him or herself in the position of those individuals." Elżbieta Hałas in turn defines it as "the notion of the human collective's constructing and reconstructing of reality", thus related to the concept of social constructionist.

== Meaning ==
According to the concept of the humanistic coefficient, all social facts are created by social actors, and can only be understood from their perspective. No social facts can exist without connection to some individuals (although that connection does not have to necessarily be consciously perceived). Thus the sociologist should study reality by trying to understand how others see the world, not as an independent observer (objectively); in other words the scientist needs to understand the world of the subject. Ken Plummer puts it curtly as "the object of study is always linked to somebody's human meanings."

While some have criticized the humanistic coefficient approach as too close to subjectivism, Znaniecki himself saw is as anti-subjectivist; he noted that social facts like cultural systems can exist even if nobody perceives their existence. He was also critical of any value coming from personal, subjective observations, arguing that such observations have value only if they can be objectively described. Both natural and social sciences operate within the bounds of the humanistic coefficient, but the natural sciences may abstract the pheomena they analyze from it, while the social sciences are methodologically obliged to account for it. Thus Znaniecki argued that the difference between natural and social sciences lies not in the difference between objective and subjective experiences, but in the subject of what is being studied: for Znaniecki, natural sciences studied things, and social sciences – cultural values. He saw sociology as a nomothetic science that should be able to use a similar methodology as natural sciences.

The humanistic coefficient concerns the ontology of culture, but it also has an epistemological aspect, as it describes how sociological concepts should be constructed in an environment where social facts investigated by the researchers can be accessed only through experiences and actions of the subjects he or she observes.

The humanistic coefficient is a major element in the sociological theory of Znaniecki.

== See also ==
- Culturalism
- Empathy
- Humanistic sociology
- Verstehen
