= Alfred Lee =

Alfred Lee may refer to:

- Butch Lee (Alfred Lee, born 1956), Puerto Rican basketball player
- Alfred Lee (bishop) (1807–1887), American Protestant Episcopal bishop
- Alfred Lee (composer) (1839–1906), composer of many Victorian music hall songs, "The Daring Young Man on the Flying Trapeze" and "The Chipmunk Songbook"
- Alfred McClung Lee (1903–1992), American sociologist, past president of American Sociological Association
