= Climate change mitigation framework =

Theoretical framework

There are various theoretical frameworks to mitigate climate change. Frameworks are significant in that they provide a lens through which an argument can be addressed, and can be used to understand the possible angles from which to approach solving climate change. Frameworks in political science are used to think about a topic from various angles in order to understand different perspectives of the topic; common ones in international political science include rationalist, culturalist, marxist, and liberal institutionalist. See international relations theory for more frameworks through which problems can be analyzed.

== History of approach to solving climate change ==
Historically climate change has been approached at a multinational level where a consensus decision is reached at the United Nations (UN), under the United Nations Framework Convention on Climate Change (UNFCCC). This represents the dominant approach historically of engaging as many international governments as possible in taking action in on a worldwide public issue. While there is a precedent that this model can work, as seen in the Montreal Protocol, there has been a shift away from this after it failed in the Kyoto Protocol and more recently is in jeopardy for the Paris Agreement.

=== Free rider problem ===
Unanimous consensus decision making has presented problems where any small number of countries can block passage of a resolution on what all countries will do to address the issue. Because of this small number of countries that do not want a resolution to the problem, all other countries are faced with the choice to attempt to combat the collective problem unilaterally, or also defect and economically benefit from not allocating the necessary resources to change. This is essentially the free rider problem present in the tragedy of the commons, where the world's climate is a public, non-rival, non-excludable good. The free rider problem can be summarized as the issue of a party receiving benefits of a public good without contributing to the cost. This often results in the good being overused or damaged by parties who are unable to be excluded from the using the good, resulting in a suboptimal good for everyone.

=== Montreal Protocol ===
Despite the issue of the free rider problem, there has been a precedent which suggests that action on climate change can be accomplished on the world scale, as this was seen with previous agreements such as the Montreal Protocol. This agreement effectively phased out various substances that were causing the depletion of the ozone layer (ODS), and addressed an international issue through a treaty with a multilateral fund, subsidization for technology transfer, and professional involvement of the scientific community.

=== Kyoto Protocol ===
The Kyoto Protocol was another international agreement that aimed to reduce emissions and greenhouse gases in the atmosphere, focusing on what industrialized nations could do to limit this. Nations in the agreement were assigned maximum amounts of emissions, and if these were not met then there was a penalty of a lower limit. It was not successful in its initial goal of decreasing greenhouse gas emissions, evidenced by the facts in the further rounds of countries pledging commitments, there were many significant defections, including Canada and the US, and countries not following through on pledges. This created a precedent where countries determined their own contributions and were able to withdraw from the agreement at any time, reintroducing the free-rider problem. The Doha Round extended the Kyoto Protocol to 2020 by reintroducing emissions targets, but was effectively replaced by the following Paris Agreement.

=== Paris Agreement ===
More recently, the 2016 Paris Agreement has come out with Nationally Determined Contributions (NDCs), which are determined by countries and must be ambitious and progressive with every 5 years. Since the NDCs are determined by each individual country, there is a potential problem of countries not being stringent enough with themselves, misreporting, or simply not setting goals that will meet the under 2°C increase in temperature requirement set out by the 2018 Intergovernmental Panel on Climate Change Special Report that is deemed necessary to meet in order to mitigate detrimental effects on hundreds of millions of lives.

== History of climate change frameworks ==
As a result of the historical precedent that international consensus and decision making can be accomplished under the threat of a global environmental issue, with the depletion of the ozone layer, there has been a tendency towards a top-down, consensus-based approach to addressing climate change through the UNFCCC. This approach is the dominant one where all world governments are engaged, which makes sense as the entire population of the world is affected by this issue. The top-down approach is that of strong central oversight by a majority of world governments in determining how various approaches to climate change mitigation should be implemented. This approach has been the largest route to tackling the goal of solving climate change, however the world is not on track to reach the under 2°C warming in average temperature that would help hundreds of millions of people.

Thus, the top-down framework of only utilizing the UNFCCC consensus approach has been proposed to be ineffective, with counter proposals of bottom up governance and decreasing the emphasis of the UNFCCC. There is a lack of consensus leading to various frameworks being proposed with varying levels of involvement of the UNFCCC and other intergovernmental actors, with proposed local-level approaches, emphasis on innovation and competition, enforcement mechanisms, and multilateral forums.

== Polycentric approach ==
The polycentric approach is a proposition to look at the relationships between cities, smaller and larger governments, and private actors when unconstrained by a mandated plan from the top (UNFCCC). The shared interests of furthering action on climate change leads to a form of competition between various actors, but also forces them to look to each other to find out what practices are most effective. This can be seen at city-wide levels on taxation, where one city starts a tax on an unsustainable good and others can observe the effects of the tax, and adopt the policy if it's found to be effective. This experimentation also results in trust building, as various private and governmental actors increasingly communicate with each other and rely on each other's successes. This approach favors individual, low-level actors working with each other to achieve a common goal, with some integration into higher levels of governance for support, but whose integration is unnecessary and perhaps unhelpful. The polycentric approach allows a significant space for nongovernmental organizations and nonprofits to participate in furthering the cause, which is different from the top-down approach of the UNFCCC.

== Bottom-up approach ==
The bottom-up approach also emphasizes smaller entities cooperating, but with integrated support from top-level governance like the UNFCCC. These levels of support can vary depending on the approach, but all tend to include at least some level of interaction with higher levels of governance, while emphasizing lower level actors taking more action.

This approach accounts for climate clubs, which encourage global powers to take action on climate change, or pay a price for their inaction. This can include penalties such as the Carbon Border Adjustment Mechanism, exclusion from various markets by world powers, and sanctions against the country that are economically detrimental enough that they are forced to take action on climate change. This tackles the free-rider problem which is present when working with any group with a public good. The lack of international cooperation is solved through forcing other government's hands while stressing a decentralized decision making process to increase cooperation. The approach of using climate clubs with penalty defaults and integrating actors below the UNFCCC, like the OECD and the G20, to accomplish this end is somewhat experimental governance, as it borders on infringing on sovereignty of other countries by strong-arming them,{{ and has not been tried before.

== Minilateralism ==
Minilateralism (groupings with select state membership) does falls only loosely into the category of the bottom-up framework as it is against integrating nongovernmental actors and governmental actors in approaching the problem. Aside from this main difference, minilateralism encourages the smallest possible break from the current top-down UNFCCC-led approach where the UNFCCC is still employed but other intergovernmental bodies are also incorporated. Possible intergovernmental bodies to be utilized include the OECD, the G20, or other international leading bodies that could address the issue further. This encourages the UNFCCC to not completely stop working on addressing the issue from a top-down approach, but in the interim these other bodies are important in furthering the cause. Multilateralism opens up the opportunity for international cooperation initiatives, where the UNFCCC could be supplemented by other multinational organizations that work towards climate change. This does not account for the free rider problem that the bottom-up approach with sanctions approach accounts for, and instead encourages those who are willing to make change do as much as possible. This then puts the burden on those who are willing to make change, and can create an example of what should be done, but offers no penalties for those who do not follow suit.

== Failure of governance ==
Another approach suggests that government should be entirely forsaken because of the free-rider problem and shortcomings with consensus, and instead innovation, entrepreneurship, and investment in sustainable technology should be focused on. This is largely proposed because of the free rider problem of countries defecting from international agreements for their own economic gain in the short run. This is compounded by the non-excludable harms and benefits of mitigating climate change, where penalties harsh enough to sufficiently incentivize countries into taking action may not be practical, and countries will not act unless sufficiently incentivized. Under the failure of governance argument, the problems facing governance are massive and it would be less costly to invest in innovation and technology rather than governance.
