= Helena Znaniecki Lopata =

Polish American sociologist

- Born: October 1, 1925; Poznan, Poland
- Died: February 12, 2003 (aged 77)
- Education: University of Illinois
- Children: Stefan and Theodora
- Parents: Florian Znaniecki (father); Eileen Markley (mother)

Helena Znaniecki Lopata (October 1, 1925 – February 12, 2003) was a Polish-born American sociologist, author and researcher.

== Life and education ==
Born in Poznan, Poland to her father Florian Znaniecki, a sociologist, and mother Eileen Markley, an attorney, the family fled Poland to the United States due to the invasion by Nazi Germany. After settling in the US, Lopata finished high school and went on to college to obtain a bachelor's degree, master's degree, and finally a Ph.D. in sociology from the University of Chicago. Lopata went on to teach at Roosevelt University and then Loyola University, Chicago where she served as chair of the department and Director for the "Center for the Comparative Study of Social Roles". She also took her teaching on the road as a visiting professor at the University of Southern California, University of Guelph, University of Victoria and Boston College. In 1946, Lopata married businessman Richard Lopata and had a son, Stefan and a daughter, Theodora. She died in 2003 at the age of 77 in Delavan Lake, Wisconsin.

== Career highlights and accomplishments ==
Helena Lopata published twenty books during her career along with numerous articles. She was elected to many presidencies throughout her career for organizations including the Society for the Study of Social Problems (1982–83), and the Sociologists for Women in Society (1994–95). She was the chair of many American Sociological Association committees, and participated in many seminars relating to family and the sociology of aging. She did much research on the 'occupational housewife' that changed the way Americans looked at the changing roles of women during that time. She wrote a book on the same topic, which was the first such book. She was a professor at Roosevelt University before going to Loyola in 1969 where she did most of her research.

In 1974, she was featured as one of the two "central characters", along with Jack Mercer, who was the voice of Popeye, in an episode of To Tell the Truth.

== Awards and honors ==
Lopata received the following awards: "The Mead & Feminist Mentoring Award" from the Study of Symbolic Interaction, the "Mieczyslaw Haiman Award" from the Polish American Historical Association, the "Distinguished Scholar Award Society" for the Study of Social Problems, and lastly the "Bronislaw Malinowski Award" from the Polish Institute of Arts and Sciences in America. In addition to theses awards she also received an Honorary Doctorate of Sciences from the University of Guelph.

== Publications ==
- — (1971). Occupation: Housewife. New York: Oxford University Press. ISBN 978-0-19-501-468-6.
- — (1976). Polish Americans: Status Competition in an Ethnic Community. Englewood Cliffs, N.J.: Prentice-Hall. ISBN 978-0-13-686444-8.
- — (1979). Women as Widows: Support Systems. New York: Elsevier. ISBN 978-0-444-99053-2.
- —; Brehm, Henry P. (1986). Widows and Dependent Wives: From Social Problem to Federal Program. New York: Praeger. ISBN 978-0-03-046301-3.
- —; Miller, Cheryl Allyn; Barnewolt, Debra (1986). City Women in America: Work, Jobs, Occupations, Careers. New York: Praeger. ISBN 978-0-275-92098-2.
- — (1990). Societal Influences. Greenwich, Conn.: JAI Press. ISBN 978-0-89232-904-5.
- — (1994). Circles and Settings: Role Changes of American Women. Albany: State University of New York Press. ISBN 978-0-585-04450-7.
- —; Figert, Anne E. (1996). Getting down to Business. Greenwich, Conn.: JAI Press. ISBN 978-1-55938-877-1.
- — (1996). Current Widowhood: Myths & Realities. Thousand Oaks, Calif.: Sage Publications. ISBN 978-0-8039-7395-4.
