= Antinaturalism =

Antinaturalism or postnaturalism may refer to:

- Antinaturalism (sociology), the view in sociology that the natural world and the social world are different
- Antinaturalism (politics), a political movement in France positing that all human acts are natural and that ecological preservation is important inasmuch as it is necessary for the well-being of sentient life, not because of some inherently sacred attribute of nature as a whole

== See also ==
- Appeal to nature
- Naturalistic fallacy
