= Helen Culver =

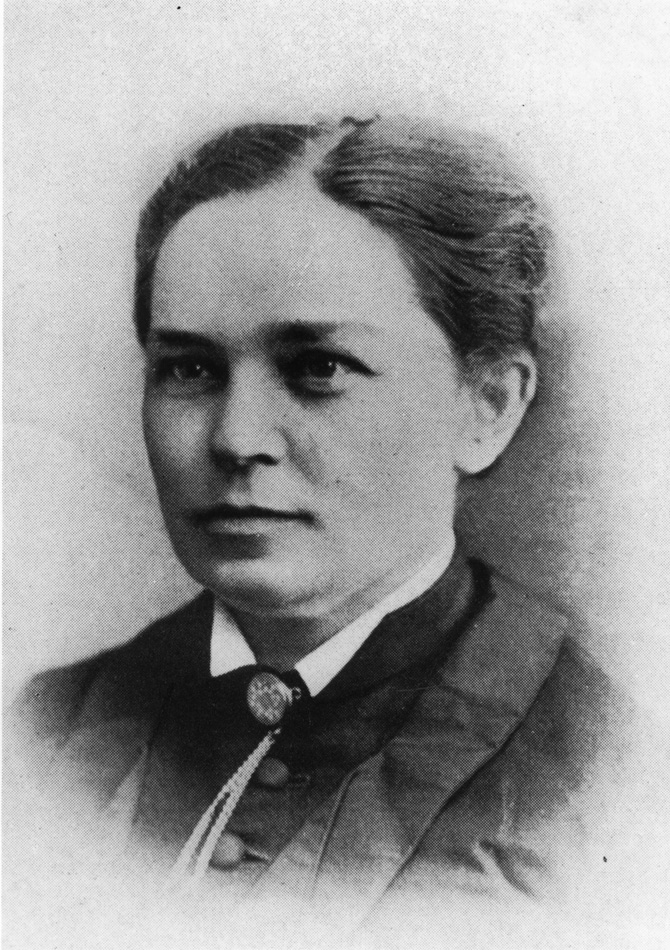
- Born: March 3, 1832; Little Valley, New York, United States
- Died: August 19, 1925 (aged 93)
- Resting place: Rosehill Cemetery, Chicago
- Occupations: Philanthropist, real estate investor, teacher

Helen Culver (March 3, 1832 – August 19, 1925) was an American teacher, real estate developer and philanthropist. Her philanthropy established Hull House, a settlement house in Chicago, as well as supporting many scholarly causes.

== Early life and education ==
Helen Culver was born in Little Valley, New York, on March 3, 1832. She was the youngest of the four children of Lyman and Emeliza (Hull) Culver. Lyman Culver was a farmer, who bought, cleared, and sold land. In 1838, Emeliza Culver died, and Helen Culver and her siblings were cared for by Lyman Culver's sisters until he remarried.

Culver attended local schools and began teaching at a country school at age 14. She also enrolled in the Randolph Academy and Female Seminary in Randolph, New York, graduating in 1852. Her studies were interrupted when Lyman Culver suddenly died from typhoid fever in 1852. His estate was bequeathed to his widow and two children from his second marriage. As a result, Helen Culver had to earn her own living at age 20.

== Career ==
Following graduation, Culver moved west with her brother Robert, settling near their grandfather in DeKalb, Illinois. In 1853, she started a private school in Sycamore, Illinois in an abandoned schoolhouse, and she also taught at the Dow Academy. In 1854, Culver relocated to Chicago, and from 1854 to 1861 she served as teacher and principal in various Chicago schools.

In this period, Culver developed her relationship with her cousin, Charles Jerold Hull, a real estate businessman. After Hull's wife, Melicent, died in 1860, Culver left public education to care for and teach Hull's son, Charles, and daughter, Fredrika.

During the American Civil War, Culver served as a nurse under the United States Sanitary Commission. After the Battle of Stones River, Culver was stationed near Murfreesboro, Tennessee and was put in charge of a one-room, forty-bed hospital. After the war, Culver returned to Chicago and the Hull family. Charles Jnr died of cholera in 1866.

From 1868 to 1889 Culver worked with Charles Hull in his real estate ventures in Chicago, at the same time teaching in a night school established by Hull for street-trade boys. Hull was in the temperance movement. He regarded ownership of property as part of good citizenship, and saw the sale of land to the poor as a public service. However, his business turned a good profit. He also bought real estate around the country, including Atlanta, Georgia, and Jacksonville, Florida. In 1869-70, Hull bought a large amount of land on the outskirts of Savannah, Georgia, and encouraged African Americans to buy land and build homes for themselves. Culver established and taught at an office night school in Savannah as well.

In 1874 Hull's daughter Fredrika died, and he spent more time out of the Chicago. On July 1, 1875 Culver became one of the first two Illinois women to be appointed as a notary public.

When Hull died in 1889, Culver inherited his entire estate. This included 224 lots in Chicago, and 1,155 lots of land in other states. Culver kept up his office, the sign reading "Miss Helen Culver, Successor to C. J. Hull, Real Estate".

== Interests and activities ==
Culver was interested in science and human welfare, and was active in the women's suffrage movement.

== Philanthropy ==
=== Hull House ===
Culver owned Hull House and rented it to Jane Addams, before later giving the property to Addams along with hundreds of thousands of dollars of donations, contributing substantially to founding the comprehensive settlement house movement in the United States. Convinced that Charles Hull wanted his estate to be used for the public good, she named the property after him, and used other inherited wealth for other philanthropic good. Culver was on the board of Hull House until 1920, during that time serving as a vice-president for many years.

=== Helen Culver Gold Medal ===
In 1907, she set up a bequest to establish the Helen Culver Gold Medal, to be awarded by the Geographic Society of Chicago to outstanding practitioners. The National Air and Space Museum holds the 1925 medal, inscribed "The Helen Culver Gold Medal, founded 1907 A.D One side bears a portrait of Culver, the other a dedication to the recipient.

The inaugural recipient was Norwegian scientist and explorer Roald Amundsen, who spoke at the society about his recent expedition to the Northwest Passage.

In 1915, Australian scientist and Antarctic explorer Douglas Mawson was awarded the medal.

In 1925 the medal was awarded to Lowell H. Smith, for having achieved the first Circumnavigation of the Earth by airplane on October 16, 1925.

=== Other philanthropy ===
Culver also supported several other important scholarly causes, such as giving over $1.1 million to the University of Chicago, making her one of the University's most important early donors. Her benefaction established the Hull Biological Laboratories at the university.

Her last gift was the Helen Culver Fund for Race Psychology, established in 1908, to address the topic of immigration and housing in Chicago neighbourhoods. The endowment of $50,000 to sociologists W. I. Thomas and Florian Znaniecki allowed them to research and produce the five-volume publication, The Polish Peasant in Europe and America (1922-24), which became very influential.

Culver's donations to the University of Chicago helped fund the Hull Biological Laboratories, which were completed in 1897.

== Personal life ==
Culver's affection for Hull was obvious in her letters to him, saying that she thought about him all the time they were apart. However Hull developed nephritis in 1884, causing him to return to Chicago, where they were joined by Martha Ellen French, a former teacher and Oberlin College classmate of Fredrika. French became a live-in companion and assistant to Culver, and lived with her for over 30 years.

== Later life and death ==
In 1900, Culver retired from the real estate business and built an estate called Rookwood, in Lake Forest. She cycled around the area, and traveled to Europe with French.

In her later years, Culver lived with her nephew, Charles Hull Ewing. In 1913, her health deteriorating, Culver gave Rookwood to Ewing, and moved to Sarasota, Florida. In 1918 French died of heart failure. Culver lost her sight and hearing, and was eventually confined to bed with a broken hip. She died on August 19, 1925, of malnutrition.
