= Ann R. Miller =

American sociologist (1921–2006)

Ann Ratner Miller
- Born: Ann Rachel Ratner; 1921
- Died: February 28, 2006 (aged 84–85)
- Education: Bryn Mawr College; University of Pennsylvania
- Occupations: sociologist, demographer
- Spouse: Ervin Miller

Ann Ratner Miller (1921 – February 28, 2006) was an American sociologist and demographer in the Wharton School of the University of Pennsylvania, described as "a pioneer in the study of human migration and patterns of labor force participation," "part of the first generation of demographers that assembled and analyzed census data to undertake the first systematic study of internal migration within the United States."

== Education and early career ==
Ann Rachel Ratner earned a bachelor's degree in 1943 in sociology from Bryn Mawr College. Later in the 1940s, she worked with Gladys L. Palmer in the Department of Industrial Research at the Wharton School; with Palmer she published the 1949 research report Industrial and occupational trends in national employment, 1910-1940, 1910-1948. In the 1950s, she also worked as a statistician for the United States Census Bureau.

She married Ervin Miller, and completed her Ph.D. in sociology in 1962 at the University of Pennsylvania.

Her dissertation, supervised by Dorothy Swaine Thomas, was State Labor Force Trends and Differentials in the United States from 1870 to 1950.

== Later career ==
Miller continued working as a researcher in the Population Studies Center of the Wharton School from 1960 to 1971; she was a "founding member" of the center, and remained associated with it for the rest of her career. In 1971, she was appointed as a research associate professor of sociology in the Wharton School, and in 1972, she was elected as a Fellow of the American Statistical Association. By 1980, she had become a regular-rank full professor, and the chair of the Committee on Occupational Classification and Analysis of the National Research Council Assembly of Behavioral and Social Sciences.

Miller served as editor-in-chief of the journal Demography from 1985 to 1987. She retired in 1987.

== Equal pay study ==
In 1981 Miller chaired a committee of the Equal Employment Opportunity Commission, appointed by President Jimmy Carter, that found that women are "systematically underpaid", both by being concentrated in lower-paid positions and by being paid less than men for comparable positions. The committee suggested that a notion of "comparable worth", used to adjudicate legal cases for gender discrimination, could improve the situation, but would not remove disparities caused by discrimination in hiring. Miller knew much of this already from personal experience; her obituary for the Population Association of America (of which she was first vice president in 1980) writes "Most of her career was spent at a time when it was very difficult for women to receive their due as full participants in science and the academy."
