= Hope Tisdale Eldridge =

American physical educator, demographer, and statistician

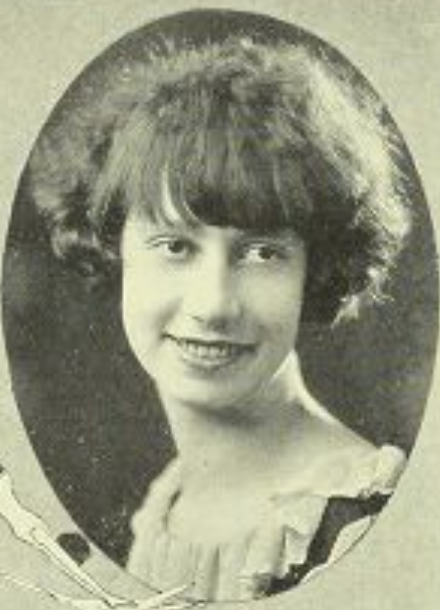
- Hope Tisdale, from the 1925 yearbook of Barnard College
- Born: Dorothy Hope Tisdale; June 18, 1904; Mobile, Alabama
- Died: October 5, 1991 (aged 87)
- Occupations: Demographer, statistician

Dorothy Hope Tisdale Eldridge (June 18, 1904 – October 5, 1991) was an American physical educator, demographer, and statistician.

== Early life and education ==
Hope Tisdale was born in Mobile, Alabama, the daughter of Marion Eugene Tisdale and Helen M. Sturtevant Tisdale. She graduated from Barnard College in 1925. She trained for a career as a physical educator at the Boston Central School of Hygiene and Physical Education. She later completed a master's degree at New York University in 1935, and doctoral studies in sociology at the University of North Carolina at Chapel Hill in 1942. Her doctoral thesis was titled "Urbanization: A Study of the Process of Population Concentration in the United States and its Relation to Social Change".

== Career ==
Tisdale taught physical education at the University of North Carolina at Greensboro from 1927 to 1938. In the 1930s she worked with the Works Progress Administration in North Carolina, and became interested in demography and statistics. Pursuing that interest, she took a job as an analyst with the United States Census Bureau from 1942 to 1947, and then with the Food and Agriculture Organization of the United Nations. She was editor of the UN's Demographic Yearbook beginning in 1950.

In 1952, Tisdale became a target of the Internal Security Subcommittee of the United States Senate Judiciary Committee, and her refusal to cooperate with their questions led to her dismissal from the UN. She later sued, and was awarded compensation from the United Nations for her firing. She taught sociology at the University of Tampa in 1958.

== Selected publications ==
- "The Process of Urbanization" (1942)
- The implications of regionalism to folk sociology, with illustrations from the Southern regions (1943)
- "Demographic Status of South America" (1945, with Halbert L. Dunn and Nora P. Powell)
- "The Changing Sex Ratio in the United States"
- Forecasts of the Population of the United States, 1945-1975 (1948, with Pascal Kidder Whelpton and Jacob S. Seigel)
- Population policies: A survey of recent developments (1954)
- Still Digging: Interleaves from an Antiquary's Notebook (1955)
- The materials of demography: A selected and annotated bibliography (1959)
- Population Redistribution and Economic Growth, United States, 1870–1950. Vol. III, Demographic Analysis and Interrelations (1964, with Dorothy Swaine Thomas)
- "Demographic Analyses and Interrelations" (1964, with Dorothy Swaine Thomas)
- "Net Intercensal Migration for States and Geographic Divisions of the United States, 1950-1960: Methodological and Substantive Aspects" (1965)
- "The Measurement of Internal Migration" (1966)
- "The estimation of intercensal migration from birth-residence statistics: A study of data for the United States, 1950 and 1960" (1968)
- "The Estimation of Intercensal Migration from Birth-residence Statistics: A Study of Data for the United States, 1950 and 1960" (1968, with Yun Kim)

== Personal life ==
Hope Tisdale married translator and Romance languages professor Carey DeWitt Eldridge in 1942. Hope Tisdale Eldridge died in 1991. Her papers are archived at Columbia University.
