= Thomas theorem =

Sociological theory

The Thomas theorem is a theory of sociology which was formulated in 1928 by William Isaac Thomas and Dorothy Swaine Thomas:

If men define situations as real, they are real in their consequences.

In other words, the interpretation of a situation causes the action. This interpretation is not objective. Actions are affected by subjective perceptions of situations. Whether there even is an objectively correct interpretation is not important for the purposes of helping guide individuals' behavior.

The Thomas theorem is not a theorem in the mathematical sense.

== Definition of the situation ==
In 1923, W. I. Thomas stated more precisely that any definition of a situation would influence the present. In addition, after a series of definitions in which an individual is involved, such a definition would also "gradually [influence] a whole life-policy and the personality of the individual himself". Consequently, Thomas stressed societal problems such as intimacy, family, or education as fundamental to the role of the situation when detecting a social world "in which subjective impressions can be projected on to life and thereby become real to projectors".

The definition of the situation is a fundamental concept in symbolic interactionism. It involves a proposal upon the characteristics of a social situation (e.g. norms, values, authority, participants' roles), and seeks agreement from others in a way that can facilitate social cohesion and social action. Conflicts often involve disagreements over definitions of the situation in question. This definition may thus become an area contested between different stakeholders (or by an ego's sense of self-identity).

A definition of the situation is related to the idea of "framing" a situation. The construction, presentation, and maintenance of frames of interaction (i.e., social context and expectations), and identities (self-identities or group identities), are fundamental aspects of micro-level social interaction.

== See also ==
- Impression management – Process to attempt to influence perceptions
- Linguistic relativity – Hypothesis of language influencing thought
- Placebo – Substance or treatment of no therapeutic value
- Pluralistic ignorance – Incorrect perception of others' beliefs
- Self-fulfilling prophecy – Prediction that causes itself to become true
- Sociology of knowledge
- Tinkerbell effect – American expression about belief and existence
- Hyperstition – Idea that makes itself real through its own existence
