= Tinkerbell effect =

American expression about belief and existence

The "Tinkerbell effect" is an American English expression describing the phenomenon of thinking something exists only because people believe in it. The effect is named after Tinker Bell, the fairy in the play Peter Pan, who is revived from near death by the belief of the audience.

The opposite form is called the "reverse Tinkerbell effect", a term coined by David Post in 2003. It stipulates that the more you believe in something the more likely it is to vanish. For example, as more people believe that driving is safe, more people will drive carelessly, in turn making driving less safe.

== Various applications ==
=== In motion perception ===
In the Journal of Consciousness Studies, Frank H. Durgin applies this expression to the study of human motion detection and perception in his paper "The Tinkerbell Effect: Motion Perception and Illusion". He questions the common belief that visual consciousness is a direct translation of the information the visual sensory organs collect. He argues that "perceptual awareness pretends to have access to more information than is actually available to visual cognition". He relates his argument about the indirectness in motion perception to how, in the play version of Peter Pan, Tinkerbell's revival depends on the live audience expressing their belief in fairies through clapping. The Tinkerbell effect points out a significant flaw in the brain's system of receiving and interpreting visually available information: it is not directly representative of reality. With the overwhelming amount of sensory information, the brain summarizes it by filling in what it cannot make sense of. In other words, it is an act of imagination.

=== In education reform ===
David C. Paris (1997) uses the Tinkerbell effect to explain inconsistency in national education reform. He points out that while reform may be set nationally, it tends to vary depending on the school and on how individual schools manipulate it to suit their current education system. Even though reforms are intended to impact schools, schools often change reforms. Education reform can be complicated because the nature of change works from inside the institutions – driven by teachers, students, and administrators alike – outwards. "Because the reform process often works this way-from the inside out, what succeeds at the school and district level can vary widely." Paris states there is also no right way to create a better school. There is no set curriculum or teaching style that guarantees a school's successful reform. Rather, some schools seem to succeed because there is widely shared and deeply rooted belief that their unique system works. This culture of belief affects all the critical influencers on the inside, where change can begin and develop. If the school's teachers believe the work they are doing is special and valuable, the students may likely believe that as well.

In this application, hard work is equivalent to the claps of Peter Pan's live audience. If an institution has greater confidence in its methods (by having effective teachers who promote clear goals and who pay personal attention to their students), it is more likely to receive the "claps" needed for its continued success. Similar to the way in which Tinkerbell's life depends on the audience's belief in her, schools depend on this belief-culture to survive. While this culture of belief in education appears to be beneficial, it cannot be standardized among all schools. Paris argues that without some set measure of program effectiveness, the Tinkerbell effect, that helped some institutions succeed, could hold negative effects on necessary reform. Overconfidence in a system can prevent further improvement and compromise the quality of the program.

=== In the rule of law ===
Cameron Stewart uses the Tinkerbell effect to explain why readers should "clap" for the rule of law principle. The rule of law is "a fundamental ideological principle of modern Western democracies, and as such, we are often asked to believe in it with unquestioning acceptance, even though Western states often honour the principle in the breach." Stewart states that this concept is much like the character Tinkerbell in that she cannot exist unless people believe in her. He says the rule of law does not currently exist in its entirety. He describes the attempts to implement the liberal philosophies embodied by this principle as the basis of common law constitution. This states that "the rule of law, and not parliamentary sovereignty, is the supreme authority of law, placing real limits on the exercise of legislative and executive power." The issue is that it is not easy to formulate and has turned into a product of legal imagination. The author proposes that a connection between the rule of law and democracy is needed to ensure its existence. The Tinkerbell effect is used to try to effectively convince his readers to support his argument. He emphasizes the importance of adhering to or "clapping" for the rule of law because it is so dependent on our belief.

== See also ==
- Anthropocentrism
- Consensus reality
- Constructivist epistemology
- Conventional wisdom
- Feedback loop
- Reification (fallacy)
- Self-fulfilling prophecy
- Thomas theorem
- Tulpa
