= Świątniki, Włocławek County =

Świątniki
- Village
- Location within Poland
- Coordinates: 52°31′N 18°57′E
- Country: Poland
- Voivodeship: Kuyavian-Pomeranian
- County: Włocławek
- Gmina: Lubraniec
- Time zone: UTC+1 (CET)
  - Summer (DST): UTC+2 (CEST)
- Vehicle registration: CWL

Świątniki (Polish: [ɕfjɔntˈɲikʲi]) is a village in the administrative district of Gmina Lubraniec, within Włocławek County, Kuyavian-Pomeranian Voivodeship, in central Poland.

It is the birthplace of Polish sociologist Florian Znaniecki (1882–1958).
