= Dorothy Swaine Thomas =

American sociologist (1899–1977)

Dorothy Swaine Thomas (October 24, 1899 – May 1, 1977) was an American sociologist and economist. She was the 42nd President of the American Sociological Association, the first woman in that role.

== Life and career ==
Thomas was born on October 24, 1899, in Baltimore, Maryland to John Knight and Sarah Swaine Thomas.

Thomas earned a B.A. from Barnard College in 1922. She earned a PhD from the London School of Economics in 1924. For her work there she received the Hutchinson Research Medal.

Between 1924 and 1948, Thomas held research and teaching positions at various institutions in the United States and Europe, including at the University of California, Berkeley, Columbia Teachers College, the Federal Reserve Bank in New York and the Institute of Social Science at the Stockholm University.

Together with William I. Thomas, she wrote the 1928 book The Child in America. In it they formulated the Thomas theorem, a sociological theory. She married William I. Thomas in 1935.

From 1948, she worked at the University of Pennsylvania, Wharton School, first as the first professor of the Institute in sociological research, later as a co-director or director of various institutions, in particular the Population Studies Center. Her students there included Ann R. Miller, also associated for many years with the Population Studies Center.

Thomas' main field of research was population growth, in particular the statistical side thereof. She wrote a multi-volume work with Simon Kuznets on the development of population and economy of the United States.

In 1942, she was elected as a Fellow of the American Statistical Association.

In 1948, she was elected as a member to the American Philosophical Society.

In 1958–59, she was president of the Population Association of America.

After her retirement in 1970, she received an honorary doctorate from the University of Pennsylvania.

Thomas died on May 1, 1977, in Bethesda, Maryland.

== Works ==
- William I. Thomas, Dorothy S. Thomas, The Child in America, Knopf, New York 1928
- Dorothy S. Thomas, Simon Kuznets, Hope T. Eldridge, Everett S. Lee, Population Redistribution and Economic Growth: United States, 1870–1950, 3 vols, Philadelphia 1957–1964
- Dorothy Swaine Thomas, Japanese American Evacuation and Resettlement: The Salvage, with Charles Kikuchi & James Sakoda (Berkeley, Calif.: University of California Press, 1952), doi:10.2307/2941811.

== Sources ==
- Theresa Wobbe & Claudia Honegger (eds.), Frauen in der Soziologie: Neun Portraits, Beck’sche Reihe, No. 1198 (Munich: Beck, 1998). ISBN 978-3-406-39298-6.
