= Social Problems =

Sociology journal

- Language: English
- Edited by: Annulla Linders and Earl Wright II

Publication details
- History: 1953–present
- Publisher: Oxford University Press (United Kingdom)
- Frequency: Quarterly
- Impact factor: 2.071 (2017)

Standard abbreviations
- ISO 4: Soc. Probl.

Indexing
- CODEN: SOPRAG
- ISSN: 0037-7791 (print); 1533-8533 (web)
- LCCN: 56038132
- JSTOR: 00377791
- OCLC no.: 1667861

Links
- Journal homepage; Online archive

Social Problems is the official publication of the Society for the Study of Social Problems. Social Problems are universal in nature, but their intensity and type change from society to society. Social problems are socially relative. It is a quarterly peer-reviewed journal published by Oxford University Press since 2015 and formerly published by University of California Press. It was established in 1953. Some of the areas covered by the journal include conflict, social action, and change; crime and juvenile delinquency; drinking and drugs; health, health policy, and health services; mental health; poverty, class, and inequality; racial and ethnic minorities; sexual behavior, politics, and communities; and youth, aging, and the life course. The journal is co-edited by Annulla Linders and Earl Wright II (University of Cincinnati).

== Abstracting and indexing ==
Social Problems is abstracted and indexed in the Social Sciences Citation Index. According to the Journal Citation Reports, the journal has a 2017 impact factor of 2.071, ranking it 30th out of 146 journals in the category "Sociology".
