= Empirical sociology =

Empirical sociology is the study of sociology based on methodological methods and techniques for collecting, processing, and communicating primary sociological information. Describes the situation of the aspects of social life such as economy, law, family, and politics during the research. Empirical sociology is often concerned with aspects of everyday life with common sense, which it treats as a resource, a form of knowledge. Empirical sociology inductively studies how people appreciate and get along with each other. Empirical sociology is an American tradition with roots in the social reform movements of the Progressive Era.

== Definition ==
The task of empirical sociology is to conduct inductive research on a particular social phenomenon. The German sociologist Ferdinand Tönnies defined empirical sociology as the collection of factual information or evidence. Sociologist Morris Janowitz defined empirical sociology as collecting and planning empirical indicators of change. Morris describes the relationship between history and empirical sociology as "At this point, sociology and "history” converge. All empirical sociology is history, but history is not all empirical sociology".

== Timeline ==
The first stage of empirical sociology was represented by the changes introduced into the scientific procedure by the Chicago school between 1895 and 1929. The American sociologist Barry Smart, in his book "Sociology, phenomenology and Marxian analysis" that empirical sociology is established in Eastern Europe. Polish sociologist Ludwig Gumplowicz has done sociological research on society and law. Gumplowicz's main contribution to the development of empirical sociology is its focus on groups of people. Austrian philosopher of science and sociologist Otto Neurath was instrumental in the development of empirical sociology.

- Approaches

Empirical sociology, like Parsons's systems theory, is defined and criticized as "positivism". For Adorno, positivism is here characterized by two not necessarily related features.

=== Empiricism and positivism ===
Empirical and positivist approaches in sociology argue that data collection and analysis are important. Empiricism is the idea that knowledge can only be based on what our senses tell us, rather than our thoughts and feelings. Empirical sociology is therefore the view that sociology should be based on data gathered from our senses rather than abstract object theory. Positivism initially looks like empiricism, but positivism is, at some level, the belief that social issues should be studied using the methods of the physical sciences.

=== Notable Studies ===
Several landmark studies have shaped empirical sociology:

- Émile Durkheim's Suicide (1897) – Analyzed how social integration and regulation affect suicide rates.
- The Hawthorne Studies (1920s-1930s) – Explored workplace productivity and led to insights on social influences in work environments.
- Robert K. Merton's work on social structures – Developed theories on deviance and social roles based on empirical research.
- Modern Big Data Studies – Utilize computational methods and large datasets to analyze social behavior at scale.
