= Society for the Study of Social Problems =

American sociological organization

Society for the Study of Social Problems (SSSP)
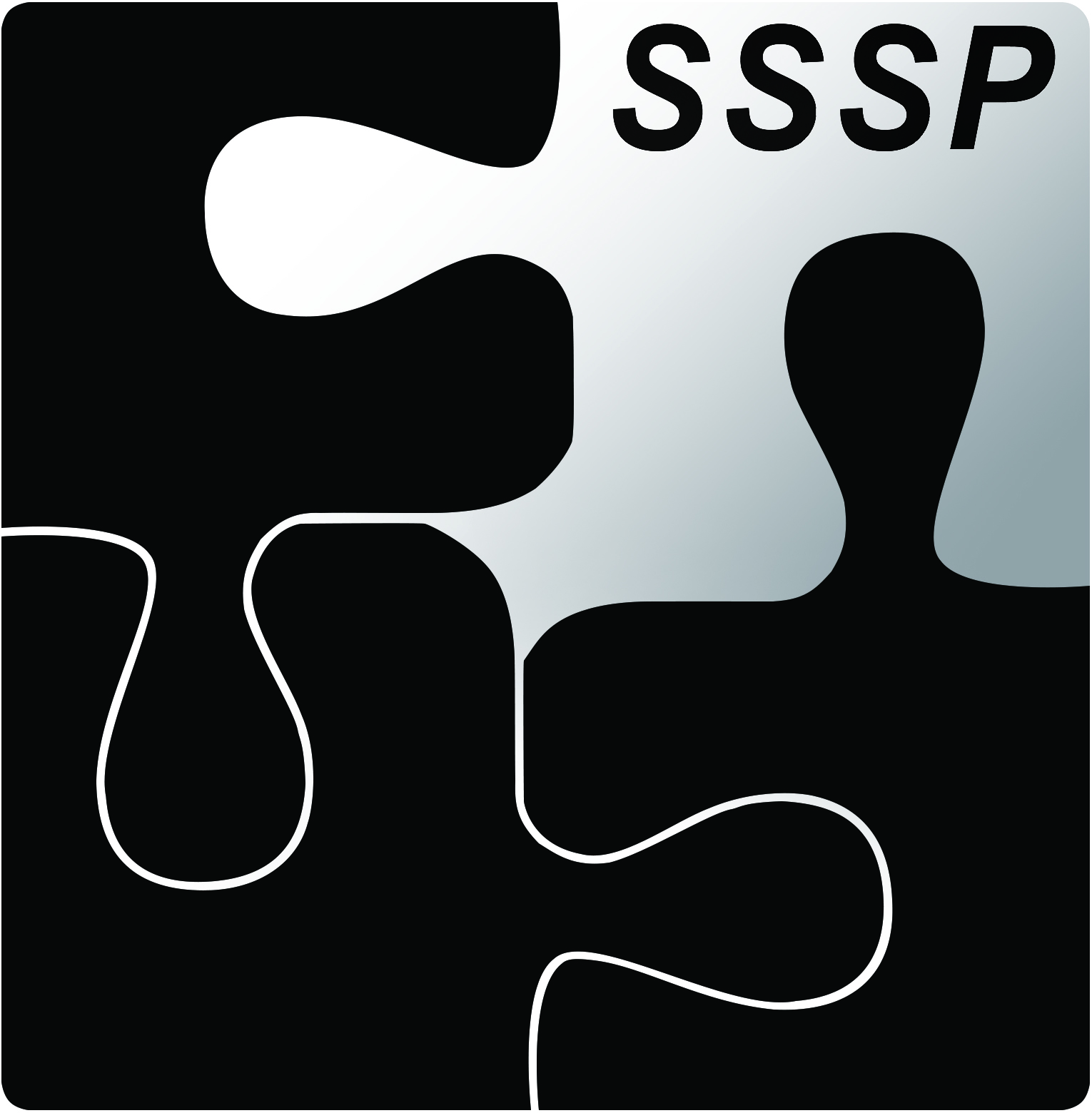
- Founded: 1951
- Founder: Elizabeth Briant Lee and Alfred McClung Lee
- Type: Professional organization
- Purpose: Pursuit of Social Justice through Social Research
- Location(s): University of Tennessee; 901 McClung Tower; Knoxville, Tennessee, United States
- Region served: Worldwide
- Key people: Elroi J. Windsor (Executive Officer); Michele Smith Koontz (Administrative Officer & Meeting Manager)
- Publication: Social Problems
- Website: www.sssp1.org

The Society for the Study of Social Problems (SSSP) is an organization founded in 1951 in counterpoint to the American Sociological Association.

== History ==
The Society was founded in 1951 by Elizabeth Briant Lee and Alfred McClung Lee. Professor of Sociology Julia Catherine Wrigley writes that the Society's founders were "liberal and left-leaning academics" and that it provided a "meeting ground for those dismayed by the often conservative thrust of the [American Sociological Organization]".

In the 1950s and 1960s the Society was closely associated with labelling theory.

== Purpose ==
The SSSP's stated purpose is to promote and protect sociological research and teaching on significant problems of social life and, particularly, to encourage the work of young sociologists; to stimulate the application of scientific method and theory to the study of vital social problems; to encourage problem-centered social research; to foster cooperative relations among persons and organizations engaged in the application of scientific sociological findings to the formulation of social policies; to foster higher quality of life, social welfare, and positive social relations in society and the global community and to undertake activities to accomplish these goals.

== Activities ==
The SSSP promotes dialogue through presentations at the annual meeting, and through listservs and division newsletters throughout the year; publishes research in the journal Social Problems; presents awards to community groups; supports undergraduate and graduate students, young scholars and activists with professional support, leadership opportunities, and scholarships; passes and acts upon public resolutions; and fosters the generation of new ideas.

== Membership ==
Membership is open to individuals and university and college departments who support the SSSP's goals.

== Publications ==
Social Problems, the flagship journal of the Society, is published through Oxford University Press. The Society also publishes various newsletters and booklets.
