= The Polish Peasant in Europe and America =

Book by Florian Znaniecki and William I. Thomas

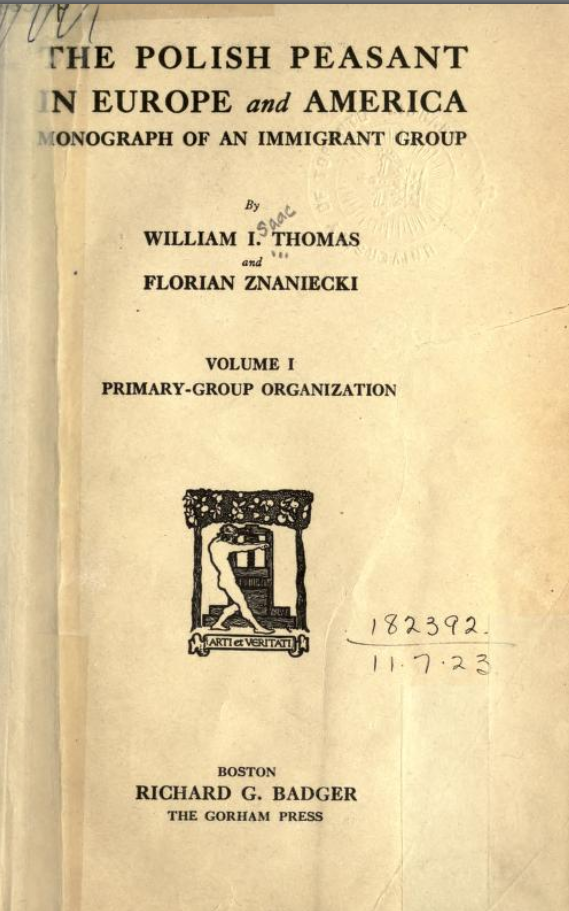
- Cover (or one of the intro pages) of the first (1918) edition of the book
- Author: Florian Znaniecki, William I. Thomas
- Language: English
- Subject: Sociology, immigration
- Publication place: United States
- Media type: Print

The Polish Peasant in Europe and America is a book by Florian Znaniecki and William I. Thomas, considered to be one of the classics of sociology. The book is a study of Polish immigrants to the United States and their families, based on personal documents, and was published in five volumes in the years 1918 to 1920.

== Theme ==
At the turn of the 20th century, Poles accounted for about a quarter of all new immigrants to the United States. Chicago was host to about 350,000 Poles and had the third largest population of Poles (after Warsaw and Łódź).

The Polish Peasant in Europe and America was the culmination of research by American sociologist William I. Thomas and Polish scholar Florian Znaniecki, carried out primarily during their time at the University of Chicago and supported by a substantial grant from millionaire Helen Culver. It is a study of Polish immigrants to America and their families based on personal documents (primarily letters) as well as on documents such as brochures, newspaper articles, parish and court documents, and so on.

The work opens with an introduction, or Methodological Note, written primarily by Znaniecki, in which he discusses the history and structure of Polish countryside, and the study's methodology. This topic is of primary concern of tomes one and two, with tomes three to five focusing on the recent changes to the Polish countryside, and the transformation of Polish peasant-immigrants in America. The third tome's major focus is the analysis an autobiography of one peasant, Władysław Wiśniewski.

Thomas was the originator of this study, having taken interest in studying immigrant communities of Chicago already in the 1890s. He was also the originator of the concept of studying written materials for sociological insight, and initially intended this work to be a collection of translated and annotated primary documents. Znaniecki convinced him to extend this project into a larger work, one with a more detailed analysis of the topic subject, its methodology and corresponding theory.

Thomas and Znaniecki intended to explore the relation between individuals and society, focusing on groups such as families and neighborhoods, and community ties, which they believed were key to social change. They argue that the Polish community was shaped less by US government policies, and more by its own culture and social ties. They stress the importance of the group, and attribute social disorganization to cases when individuals become isolated from a group (see also anomie). The authors start by analyzing the circumstances of Polish countryside and reasons for immigration, and in conclusion discuss the transformation of said immigrants, show that the Poles are becoming not American but Polish-Americans, a new ethnic group, as their culture is changing to fit the American context, but retaining some unique characteristics.

The five tomes totaled about 2,232 pages. They were published over three years: in 1918 (volumes I and II), 1919 (volume III) and 1920 (volumes IV and V).

== Controversies ==
The work has been subject to two major controversies. The first concerns a society scandal that enveloped Thomas around 1918, which resulted in him losing his professorship at the University of Chicago, and the University of Chicago Press cancelling its deal with the authors about the printing of the first edition. Subsequently the book was published in the less prestigious Gorham Press from Boston.

The second controversy concerns the question of authorship, in particular with regards to whether Thomas or Znaniecki should be considered the primary author. The book's idea originated with Thomas; however after seeing Znaniecki's proposal for changing it from a collection of primary materials into an analytical piece, and reading his proposed re-framing introduction, Thomas proposed to him that they become co-authors. Dulczewski in his biography of Znaniecki concludes that the question is moot, as both had contributed to this work significantly and "neither would have been able to author this work by themselves". While some consider Znaniecki to be a junior writer, Thomas himself wrote that "it would be quite impossible to establish who wrote what", and Bulmer concludes that "to regard Zaniecki as merely Thomas' assistant is incorrect... he took a major part in drafting the book... the two were true collaborators", with Znaniecki's skill in philosophy, methodology and the subject matter of Polish society complementing Thomas' expertise in sociology, social psychology, and the Polish-American Chicago community.

== Significance ==
This five-volume work is considered a classic of empirical sociology. Martin Bulmer in 1986 described it as a "neglected classic... landmark because it attempted to integrate theory and data in a way no American study had done before". In the introduction to the 1996 edition, Eli Zaretsky argues it can be seen as a "founding work" of American sociology.

It is a valuable contribution to the methodological development of the social sciences in the United States. The book had begun a shift from theoretical research into one grounded in empirical data. Bulmer notes that "the subsequent use in sociological research of personal documents, such as life histories, letters, diaries, and other first-person material, may in large measure be traced back to the influence of The Polish Peasant. (This approach is known as content analysis, and this study has also been described as a classic case study of this approach). The life story of Władek was the first systematically collected sociological life history".

It was a major influence on the Chicago school, providing a model for much future research. It contributed to the development of the social disorganization theory and became a landmark study of Americanization (in the word's original meaning, i.e. how do new immigrants to United States become "Americans"). It was also one of the earliest works to study the topic of immigration to the United States, particularly with regards to trying to understand both the European and the American social context.

In 1937 the Social Science Research Council listed the book as one of the six most important works in social sciences. A year later, Herbert Blumer headed a commission which produced an extensive, approximate 200-pages analysis of the book, and became the first tome in a series of Critiques of Research in the Social Science. By 1939 it had at least 30 English reviews and 10 in different languages.

A Polish edition, Chłop polski w Europie i Ameryce, was published in 1976.

== Bibliography ==
- Bulmer, Martin (15 August 1986). The Chicago School of Sociology: Institutionalization, Diversity, and the Rise of Sociological Research. University of Chicago Press. ISBN 978-0-226-08005-5.
- Dulczewski, Zygmunt (1984). Florian Znaniecki: życie i dzieło (in Polish). Wydawnictwo Poznańskie. ISBN 978-83-210-0482-2.
- Zaretsky, Eli; Znaniecki, Florian; Thomas, William I. (1996). "Introduction". The Polish Peasant in Europe and America: A Classic Work in Immigration History. University of Illinois Press. ISBN 978-0-252-06484-5.
