= Sociological naturalism =

Theory in sociology

Sociological naturalism is the view that social phenomena belong to the natural order and can be explained through the general scientific principles that govern the study of nature. In sociological texts, it is simply referred to as naturalism and can be traced back to the philosophical thinking of Auguste Comte in the 19th century. It is closely connected to positivism, which advocates use of the scientific method of the natural sciences in studying social sciences. At the same time, it should not be identified too closely with positivism, since whilst the latter advocates the use of controlled situations like experiments as sources of scientific information, naturalism insists that social processes should only be studied in their natural setting. A similar form of naturalism was applied to the scientific study of art and literature by Hippolyte Taine.

Contemporary sociologists do not generally dispute that social phenomena take place within the natural universe, and thus are subject to natural constraints, such as the laws of physics. What is for debate is the nature of the distinctiveness of social phenomena as a subset of natural phenomena. Broad support exists for the antipositivist claim that crucial qualitative differences mean that one cannot explain social phenomena effectively using investigative tools or even standards of validity derived from other natural sciences. From this point of view, naturalism does not imply scientism. A classically positivist conflation of naturalism with scientism has not disappeared; this view is still dominant in some old and prestigious schools, such as the sociology departments at the University of Chicago and McGill University. Additionally, actor-network theory has analyzed the social construction of the nature–society distinction itself.

== See also ==
- Antinaturalism (sociology)
- Antipositivism
- Creator deity
- Emergence
- Environmental social science
- Natural order (philosophy)
- Organicism
- Permaculture
- Philosophical naturalism
- Sociobiology
- Traditionalist conservatism
