= Gladys L. Palmer =

American social statistician

- Palmer, from the 1917 yearbook of Barnard College
- Born: 1895
- Died: June 27, 1967 (aged 71–72)
- Occupation: Statistician. college professor

Gladys Louise Palmer (1895 – June 27, 1967) was an American social statistician who "gained worldwide attention for her research on manpower problems and labor mobility" and for her work on the standardization of labor statistics.

== Education and career ==
Palmer earned a bachelor's degree from Barnard College in 1917, studied for a master's degree at Bryn Mawr College from 1917 to 1918, as Carola Woerishoffer Scholar in Social Economy and Social Research, and completed a Ph.D. in 1924 at the University of Pennsylvania.

She became an instructor in economics at Vassar College and Hollins College, and then moved to the Industrial Research Unit of the Wharton School of the University of Pennsylvania in 1931. By 1953 she was Research Professor of Industry and director of the Industrial Research Unit at the Wharton School. Beginning in the 1930s, she was also a frequent consultant for various federal agencies in Washington DC.

== Books ==
Palmer's books include:

- Union Tactics and Economic Change: A Case Study of Three Philadelphia Textile Unions (de Gruyter, 1932)
- I am a Woman Worker: A Scrapbook of Autobiographies (edited with Andria Taylor Hourwich, Affiliated Schools for Workers, 1936)
- Labor Mobility In Six Cities: A Report On The Survey Of Patterns And Factors In Labor Mobility, 1940-1950 (Social Science Research Council, 1954)
- Philadelphia Workers in a Changing Economy (de Gruyter, 1956)
- The Reluctant Job Changer: Studies in Work Attachments and Aspirations (with Herbert S. Parnes, Richard C. Wilcock, Mary W. Herman, and Carol P. Brainerd, de Gruyter, 1962)

== Awards and honors ==
In 1946, Palmer was elected as a Fellow of the American Statistical Association.
