= Analytic induction =

Analytic induction is a research strategy in sociology aimed at systematically developing causal explanations for types of phenomena. It was first outlined by Florian Znaniecki in 1934. He contrasted it with the kind of enumerative induction characteristic of statistical analysis. Where the latter was satisfied with probabilistic correlations, Znaniecki insisted that science is concerned with discovering causal universals, and that in social science analytic induction is the means of discovering these.

Analytic induction begins by studying a small number of cases of the phenomenon to be explained, searching for similarities that could point to common factors. Once a hypothetical explanation has been developed, further cases are examined. If any one of these does not fit the hypothesis, either the hypothesis is reformulated so as to match the features of all the cases so far studied, or the original definition of the type of phenomenon to be explained is redefined, on the grounds that it does not represent a causally homogeneous category. Further cases are then studied until no more anomalies seem to be emerging.

The approach was further refined and applied by Alfred Lindesmith in a study of opiate addiction and Donald Cressey in an investigation of financial trust violation (embezzlement). Later it was applied by Howard S. Becker in a study of marijuana use.

This method has been subjected to considerable criticism, notably by W.S. Robinson, who argued that it could only discover necessary not sufficient conditions for the production of the phenomenon being investigated. The term has also come to be used in a variety of ways, some of them bearing little relationship to its original sense.

There are some similarities with, but also important differences from, other approaches, notably grounded theory and qualitative comparative analysis. Perhaps analytic induction's most distinctive and important feature is recognition of the potential need to refine and develop the initial categorisation of what is to be explained in the course of producing explanations.
