= W. I. Thomas =

American sociologist (1863–1947)

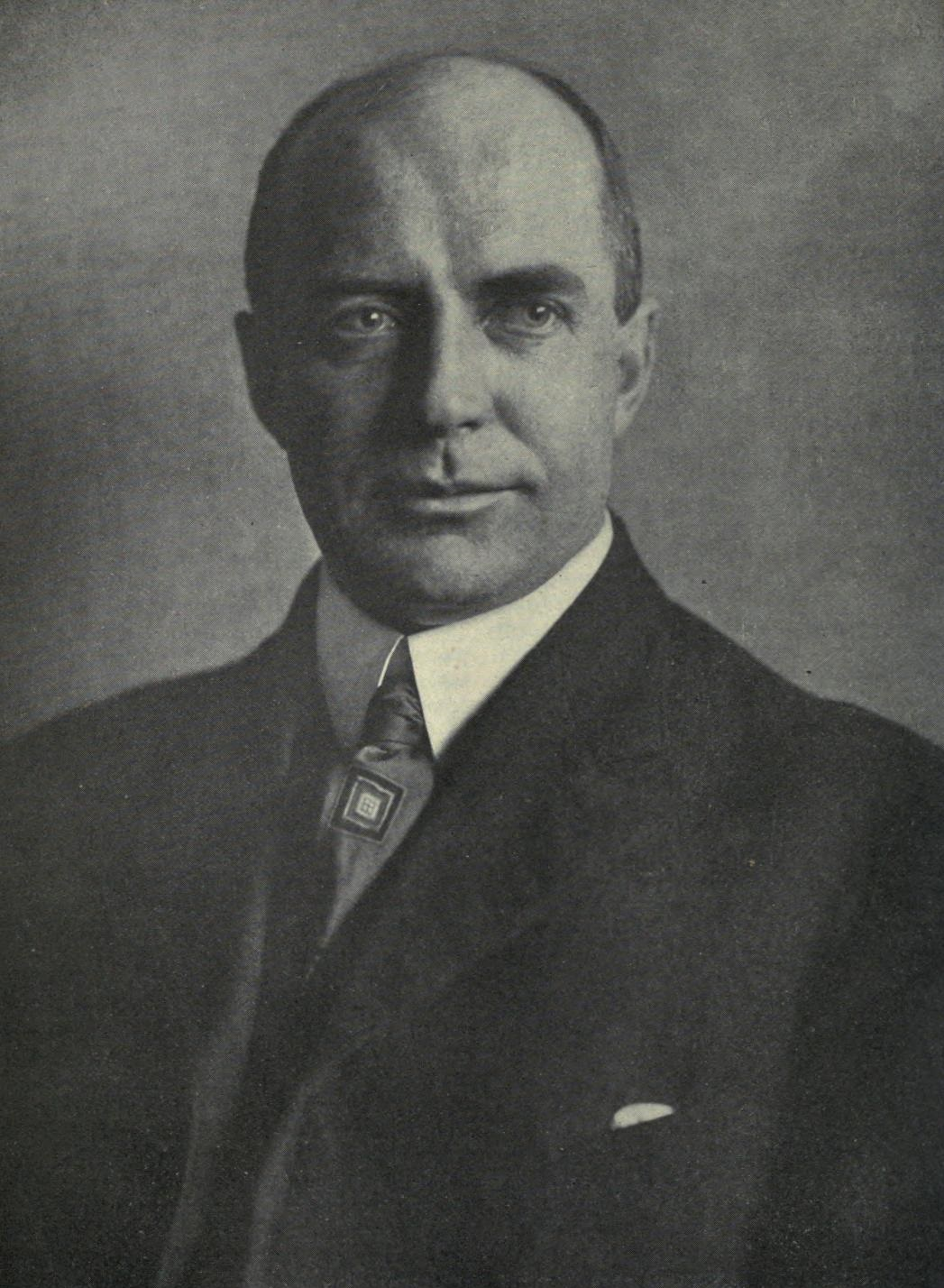
- Thomas, before 1907
- Born: William Isaac Thomas; 13 August 1863; Russell County, Virginia, U.S.
- Died: 5 December 1947 (aged 84); Berkeley, California, U.S.
- Resting place: Old Gray Cemetery, Knoxville, Tennessee, U.S.
- Education: University of Tennessee; University of Chicago
- Known for: Thomas theorem
- Spouses: Harriet Park (m. 1888; div. 1934) Dorothy Swaine (m. 1935)
- Awards: Highest oratory honors of the University of Tennessee
- Scientific career
- Fields: Sociology
- Workplaces: University of Tennessee, Oberlin College, University of Chicago
- Doctoral advisor: Albion W. Small; Charles Richmond Henderson

Signature
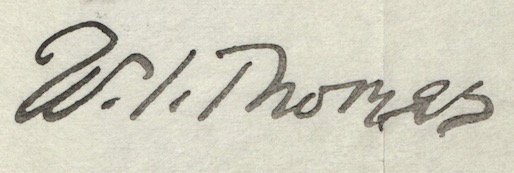

William Isaac Thomas (August 13, 1863 – December 5, 1947) was an American sociologist, understood today as a key figure behind the theory of symbolic interactionism.

Collaborating with Polish sociologist Florian Znaniecki, Thomas developed and influenced the use of empirical methodologies in sociological research and contributed theories to the sociology of migration. Thomas went on to formulate a fundamental principle of sociology, known as the Thomas theorem, whereby he would contend that "if men define situations as real, they are real in their consequences." This microsociological concept served as a theoretical foundation for the field of symbolic interactionism which was developed by Thomas's younger peers—primarily at the University of Chicago.

== Biography ==
=== Personal life ===
William Isaac Thomas was born on a farm in the Elk Garden section of Russell County, Virginia, on 13 August 1863. His mother was Sarah Price Thomas and his father was Thaddeus Peter Thomas, a Methodist minister of Pennsylvania Dutch descent. Thomas' father, wanting to broaden the educational opportunities for his children, moved the family to Knoxville, home of the University of Tennessee, when Thomas was a boy.

In 1888, Thomas married his first of two wives, Harriet Park, and in 1935, after the two divorced, Thomas married Dorothy Swaine Thomas, 36 years his junior. Dorothy worked as his research assistant and co-author and would become the first woman president of the American Sociological Association in 1952 (William had been president in 1927).

After leaving Harvard as a lecturer, Thomas gradually withdrew into retirement. Thomas spent his time in New York City, New Haven. He died at the age of 84 years old in Berkeley, California, on 5 December 1947. His body rests at Old Gray Cemetery in Knoxville, Tennessee.

=== Education ===
Beginning in 1880, Thomas studied literature and classics at the University of Tennessee, where he obtained a B.A. degree in 1884 and became Adjunct Professor in English and Modern Languages. While at Knoxville, Thomas also taught courses in Greek, Latin, French, German, and Natural history. At the same time, he developed an interest in ethnology and social science after reading Herbert Spencer's Principles of Sociology.

From 1888 to 1889, he attended the German universities of Berlin and Göttingen to pursue studies of classic and modern languages. During his time in Germany, he also furthered his interest in ethnology and sociology under the influence of German scholars such as Wilhelm Wundt.

Upon his return to the United States in 1889, Thomas taught at Oberlin College in Oberlin, Ohio from 1889 to 1895 as a professor of English and then sociology.

In 1894, Thomas was invited to teach a class in sociology at the University of Chicago, whose preeminent sociology department is seen as the founding location of the discipline in the United States. The next year, he relocated to the University of Chicago permanently in order to pursue graduate studies in sociology and anthropology in the university's new department of sociology, where he finished his Ph.D. thesis, "On a Difference in the Metabolism of the Sexes", in 1896. After the completion of this work, he returned to Europe to conduct field studies in various ethnic and cultural problems in preparation for the writing of a comparative work on European nationalities that he never completed.

== Professional life ==
=== University of Chicago ===
For nearly the next 25 years, Thomas taught sociology and anthropology at the University of Chicago, becoming instructor in 1895, assistant professor in 1896, associate professor in 1900, and professor in 1910. From 1895 until 1917, he also co-edited the American Journal of Sociology.

Thomas' first major publication would be in 1907 with the book Sex and Society. Despite a biological bias that would nowadays be considered sexist by many (e.g. "Anthropologists…regard women as intermediate between the child and the man"), the book was progressive for its time. In Sex and Society, Thomas speculates that women's intellect might actually be superior to that of men's "due to their superior cunning" and "superior endurance."

For the next decade (1908–1918) Thomas conducted research and began collaborating with Florian Znaniecki in 1913 to write The Polish Peasant in Europe and America. This work utilized an empirical methodological framework which was groundbreaking at the time and introduced the ideas of Social Organization/Disorganization.

In 1918, Thomas was arrested and mired in scandal due to his relationship with the wife of a U.S. Army officer. Though charges under the Mann Act were eventually dropped, Thomas' moral and academic reputation was permanently damaged and he was dismissed by the University of Chicago before his trial reached a verdict.

=== Post-Scandal ===
After the scandal, Thomas relocated to New York City and would never again obtain a tenured position. From 1923 to 1928, he lectured at the New School for Social Research, a progressive but marginally influential academic institution at that time, where he was able to make connections with a younger generation of sociologists who would eventually help Thomas restore his reputation. Thorstein Veblen, who had co-founded the school in 1919, had fallen from academic grace for similar reasons, and the school was therefore sympathetic to Thomas' plight. Thomas continued his research thanks to the support of philanthropists and institutions.

1923 saw Thomas release his first work under his own name since his scandal. The Unadjusted Girl examines female delinquency, mainly in terms of transactional and casual sex, through the lens of socialization and how young women are imbued by society to conceive of sex and how this affects their behaviors and outcomes. Thomas conceives of this socialization as a "definition of one's situation" and is his earliest known application of the Thomas theorem.

In 1927, Thomas was elected president of the American Sociological Society (now known as the American Sociological Association). He belonged to a group often referred to as the earlier psychological school of sociologists along with Franklin Henry Giddings, E.A. Ross, Charles Cooley, and Ellsworth Faris. Thomas never published any material on the subject, but did use it as lecture material.

In 1928, Thomas co-authored The Child in America alongside research assistant Dorothy Swaine Thomas. This work explores how communal expectations of adjustment or maladjustment of children informs behavior problems in children and how the definition of these children's situations affects how they conceive their own maturation and behavior. This work marks the first use of the Thomas theorem verbatim.

In 1936, Pitirim A. Sorokin, chairman of the sociology department at Harvard University, invited Thomas to become a visiting lecturer. Thomas accepted the invitation and remained in Harvard until 1937.

== Theory and research ==
Though Thomas began his career focused on ethnography and macro-sociological studies, as his career progressed he became increasingly involved in the work of micro-sociology. When discussing his interests, Thomas writes:

The sociopsychological aspects of culture history, or otherwise stated, social psychology as examined in relation to races, nationalities, classes, interest groups, etc., in different cultural situations and historical epochs; and second, personality development in normal, criminal and psychopathic individuals in relation to cultural situations and particular trains of experience as seen through their life-histories, which may be in the form of autobiographies, case studies, continuous and organized inter-views, etc. (I do not say `psychoanalysis' because of the meaning which this term has acquired).

Furthermore, explaining about sociologists who have influenced him, Thomas writes:

I do not feel that I have been greatly influenced by any of my teachers of sociology. My interests, as I have indicated, were in the marginal fields and not in sociology as it was organized and taught at that time, that is, the historical and methodological approach of Professor Small and the remedial and correctional interests of Professor Henderson.

=== Social research and migration studies ===
In 1908, Thomas received a substantial grant from Helen Culver through the Helen Culver Fund for Race Psychology. The grant was to be used to finance research on the life and culture of immigrants for ten years. Until 1918, Thomas utilized the grant to undertake several journeys to Europe in order to study the background of East European immigrant groups. Initially planning to study several nationalities, he narrowed his topic down to immigrants from Poland, who formed the largest and most visible ethnic community in Chicago. For this purpose Thomas studied the Polish language, interviewed members of Chicago's Polish community, and made field trips to Poland.

Considered a pioneer of the biographical approach in social research and migration studies, Thomas employed methods of field observation that ethnographers had developed previously to study non-literate societies. Thomas has anecdotally claimed that an accident inspired him to use personal written material as primary ethnographic sources. Thomas recounted that while he was walking through a Chicago neighborhood he was almost hit with a garbage bag that had been thrown out of a window. The bag hit the ground and burst open on the sidewalk, revealing a letter that had been written by a Polish immigrant. This chance occurrence serendipitously led Thomas to develop the biographical approach to empirical sociological research that would prove part of his lasting reputation in the field.

He spent the next several years collecting oral and written reports from Chicago's Polish community as well as from Polish natives. Thomas utilized newspaper reports, archives of organizations, personal letters, diaries, and public documents which he acquired by placing advertisements in Chicago's Polish-language press, offering, for example, 10 or 20 cents for each mailed letter collected from Poland. This empirical approach of using first hand biographical material to measure larger social patterns was one of the early applications of empirical ethnography in the study of sociology, and can inform the methods of sociological studies which are conducted today.

=== The Polish Peasant in Europe and America ===
In 1913 on one of his journeys to Poland, Thomas met the Polish sociologist Florian Witold Znaniecki, who was editing the journal Wychodźca polski ("The Polish Emigrant") and directing an organization representing Polish emigrants in Warsaw. Znaniecki assisted Thomas in his studies of organizations, which proved to be a valuable resource. When World War I broke out the following year, Znaniecki himself left Poland, which had been partitioned between three of the warring parties and now became a theater of war. Znaniecki decided to travel to Chicago, where he met up with Thomas, but whether or not Thomas had formally invited Znaniecki remains unclear.

In all events, Thomas immediately employed Znaniecki as his research assistant. Znaniecki eventually became Thomas's co-author on their monumental work The Polish Peasant in Europe and America (1918–1919), which Lewis Coser called "the earliest major landmark of American sociological research". In it, Thomas and Znaniecki used a biographical approach to understanding culture in general. Furthermore, Thomas and Znaniecki's work developed an approach to understanding ethnicity in particular, which in many respects was ahead of its time and is currently being rediscovered in the context of transnational studies in migration. Studies akin to this work led to conclusions which may be seen as common knowledge today such as urbanization leads to the dissolution of shared fate and leads to the creation of new identities. Analysis which may be less ubiquitous lies in Thomas and Znaniecki's investigation of social organization. Thomas and Znaniecki note that as immigrant groups (such as the Poles they studied) are isolated from the environment they were socialized in and there is no form of enforcement of social rules, these social rules start to dictate a population's moral behaviors less and less. Thomas notes that this process primarily affects social institutions before it secondarily affects the conceptions and behaviors of social actors.

=== Thomas theorem and the 'definition of the situation' ===
"It is not important whether or not the interpretation is correct — if men define situations as real, they are real in their consequences." — W. I. Thomas & Dorothy Swaine Thomas, The Child in America

In his highly acclaimed work, The Unadjusted Girl (1923), Thomas explores female delinquency and promiscuity by exploring how women are socialized in distinct backgrounds to conceive of sex, responsibility and ladyhood based on personal interpretations of their situations and how this affects their behaviors and outcomes. It is through these psychosociological interpretations that Thomas introduced and developed the influential concept of the definition of the situation.

According to the definition of the situation, prior to making a decision, people "generally examine and deliberate about occurrences before acting." Individuals do not react to reality or facts, but rather their perception or personal 'definition' of these situations and facts. Therefore, the "real" facts of social interactions are the subjective interpretations individuals give to an objective reality. "If people view somebody as great, then he is." Along with the ideas of George Herbert Mead, this concept later proved to be an important part of social constructionism, and of the rebellion of symbolic interactionism against structural functionalism.

Thomas' 1928 book, The Child in America, co-authored with Dorothy Swaine Thomas, includes a notion, drawing from his initial idea of the definition of the situation, that would become a fundamental law of sociology, known as the Thomas theorem: “If men define situations as real, they are real in their consequences.”

The Child in America specifically investigated the misbehavior of children can be attributed to communal expectations of behavior and how these children define their own situations is indicative of their own conceptions maturation and acceptable behavior. Though this formation of definitions seems inherently individualistic, Thomas acknowledges that these definitions which dictate our behaviors spawn from societal institutions such as the family. Thomas also dialogues with the idea of "spontaneous" definitions which can alter and modify one's understanding of one's own definitions and symbols. Thomas states this can occur putting different people in the same situation or even placing the same individual in the same situation multiple times or with varying contexts.

The idea that personal definitions can be "spontaneously" changed through a process of negotiation is fervently contested by many sociologists who believe that an obedience to a novel set of rules and expectations is what dictates a shift in one's definitions over time.

== Scandal ==
Despite the prominence gained through The Polish Peasant, Thomas's reputation, both academic and non-academic, proved precarious. For a number of reasons, he was subject to critical attention from the conservative Chicago establishment.

- One of the reasons was his left-wing political opinions on the etiology of crime. Studying the problem of delinquency in Chicago's Polish immigrant community, he adopted a pragmatic attitude to the problem rather than a moral one.
- Second, some of his research on topics, such as sexual behavior, were considered controversial. Yet, Thomas continued to be outspoken about his research and related topics. Thus, he was required by the university to issue clarifying statements and apologies to the press on at least one occasion.
- Third, he led an individualistic and lifestyle for his era which prompted his peers to further question his morals. His lifestyle was unconventional and did not conform with the contemporary image of a respectable professor and made him controversial among his colleagues.

In 1918, the FBI arrested Thomas under the Mann Act, which prohibits "interstate transport of females for immoral purposes," while in the company of one Mrs. Granger, the wife of an army officer with the American forces in France. It has been suggested that Thomas's arrest was meant to discredit his wife, who at the time was a pacifist activist. The case was dismissed but his career was damaged irreversibly. The university, under conservative Harry Pratt Judson, dismissed him without awaiting the outcome of his trial and with little protest from his colleagues.

Under orders from Judson, The University of Chicago Press, which already had published the first two volumes of The Polish Peasant, terminated its contract with Thomas, including ceasing distribution. Thomas was able to arrange for the entire work to be published in Boston by Richard G. Badger. The Carnegie Corporation of New York, which had previously commissioned Thomas to write a volume for its "Americanization" series, refused to publish it in Thomas' name. Thus, in 1921, Old World Traits Transplanted appeared by authors Robert E. Park and Herbert A. Miller, who had contributed only minor parts to the book. It was not until 1951 that the book's authorship was re-credited to Thomas by a committee of the Social Science Research Council and reissued with its author's actual name.

== Works ==
- 1903 (as editor): Minnesota stories: A collection of twenty stories of college life. Collected and arranged by Charles Flint McClumpha and W.I. Thomas. Minneapolis, Minn.: Wilson.
- 1903: The relation of the medicine-man to the origin of the professional occupations. Chicago, Ill.: University of Chicago Press.
- 1907: Sex and society: Studies in the social psychology of sex. Chicago, Ill., London: University of Chicago Press / Unwin.
- 1909: (as editor): Source book for social origins. Ethnological materials, psychological standpoint, classified and annotated bibliographies for the interpretation of savage society. Chicago, Ill., London: University of Chicago Press / Unwin 1909.
- 1917: (with Herbert S. Jennings, John B. Watson, and Adolf Meyer): Suggestions of modern science concerning education. New York, N.Y.: Macmillan (includes Thomas's essay "The persistence of primary-group norms in present-day society: Their influence in our educational system").
- 1918–1920 (with Florian W. Znaniecki): The Polish peasant in Europe and America. Monograph of an immigrant group. complete 5 vol online free
  - 1918: Volume 1: Primary-group organization. Chicago, Ill.: University of Chicago Press.
  - 1918: Volume 2: Primary-group organization. Chicago, Ill.: University of Chicago Press.
  - 1919: Volume 3: Life record of an immigrant. Boston, Mass.: Badger.
  - 1920: Volume 4: Disorganization and reorganization in Poland. Boston, Mass.: Badger.
  - 1920: Volume 5: Organization and disorganization in America. Boston, Mass.: Badger.
- 1921 (with Robert E. Park and Herbert A. Miller as main authors): Old world traits transplanted. New York, London: Harper. In the aftermath of the "1918 Scandal", the book could not be published under Thomas's name, so his collaborators Park and Miller featured on the cover until a posthumous 1951 re-issue.
- 1923: The unadjusted girl. With cases and standpoint for behavior analysis. Boston, Mass.: Little, Brown 1923
- 1928: (with Dorothy Swaine Thomas): The child in America: Behavior problems and programs. New York: Knopf.
- 1937: Primitive behavior: An introduction to the social sciences. New York, London: McGraw-Hill
- 1951 (edited by Edmund H. Volkart): Social behavior and personality. Contributions of W.I. Thomas to theory and social research. New York: Social Science Research Council 1951.
- 1966: (edited by Morris Janowitz): W.I. Thomas on social organization and social personality. Selected papers. Edited and with an introduction by Morris Janowitz. Chicago, Ill., London: University of Chicago Press 1966
