= Elżbieta Hałas =

Polish sociologist

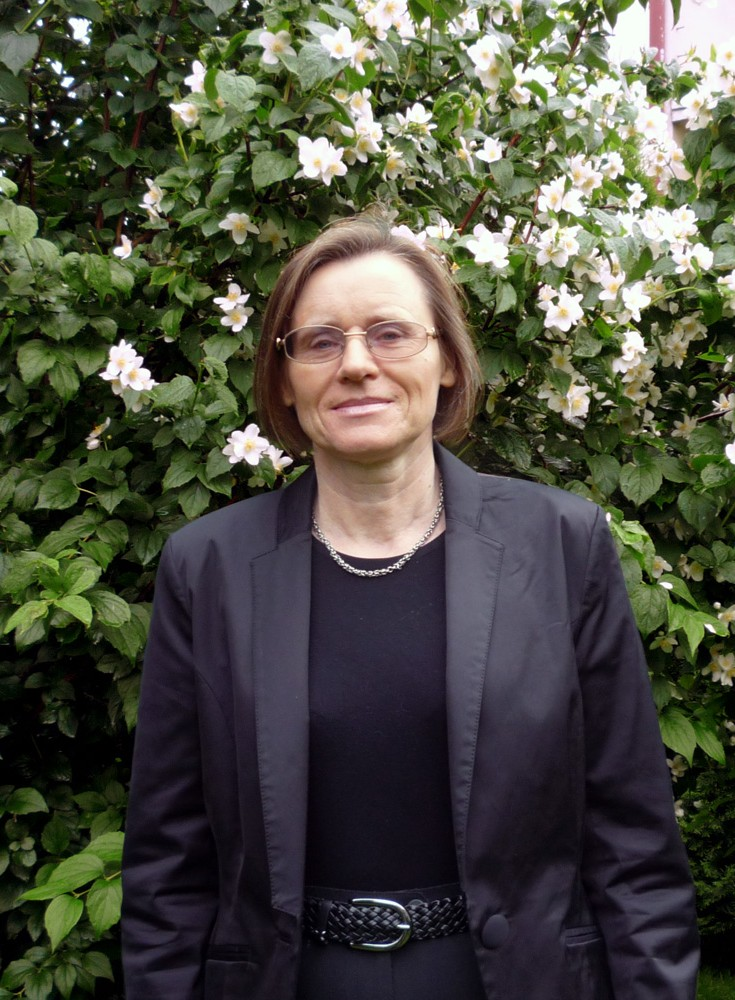
Polish sociologist Elżbieta Hałas.

Elżbieta Hałas (born 1954) is a Polish sociologist and a professor at the University of Warsaw. She specializes in the sociology of culture.

Hałas is the director of the Cultural Department in the University of Warsaw's Institute of Sociology. From 1981 to 2003, she lectured at the John Paul II Catholic University of Lublin, where she received her doctorate in 1986.

== Selected publications ==
A fuller list of Hałas's publications may be found on her Google Scholar page. Some notable ones include:

- Społeczny kontekst znaczeń w teorii symbolicznego interakcjonizmu (in Czech). Red. Wydawnictw Katolickiego Uniwersytetu Lubelskiego. 1987. ISBN 978-83-228-0084-3.
- Hałas, Elżbieta (2013). "The Past in the Present. Lessons on Semiotics of History from George H. Mead and Boris A. Uspensky". Symbolic Interaction. 36 (1): 60–77. doi:10.1002/symb.47. ISSN 0195-6086.
- Znaczenia i wartości społeczne. O socjologii Floriana Znanieckiego, Lublin (1991), Redakcja Wydawnictw Katolickiego Uniwersytetu Lubelskiego
- Konwersja. Perspektywa socjologiczna, Lublin (1992) Norbertinum, wydanie nowe (2007)
- Obywatelska socjologia szkoły chicagowskiej, Lublin (1994), Redakcja Wydawnictw Katolickiego Uniwersytetu Lubelskiego
- Symbole w interakcji, Warszawa (2001), Oficyna Naukowa
- Interakcjonizm symboliczny. Społeczny kontekst znaczeń Wydanie nowe, Warszawa (2006), Wydawnictwo Naukowe PWN
- Symbole i społeczeństwo. Szkice z socjologii interpretacyjnej, Warszawa (2007), Wydawnictwa Uniwersytetu Warszawskiego
- Towards the World Culture Society. Florian Znaniecki's Culturalism, Frankfurt Am Main (2010), Peter Lang Internationaler Verlag der Wissenschaften
