= Alfred McClung Lee =

American sociologist

Alfred McClung Lee (August 23, 1906 – May 19, 1992) was an American sociologist whose research included studies of American journalism, propaganda, and race relations.

== Biography ==
Lee was born in Oakmont, Pennsylvania in 1906. He obtained an undergraduate (1927) and master's degree (1931) at the University of Pittsburgh and a Ph.D. from Yale University (1933).

Lee's first book was The Daily Newspaper in America, The Evolution of a Social Instrument in 1937, which examined the development and influence of American newspapers. As part of his work with the Institute for Propaganda Analysis, he wrote, with his wife Elizabeth Briant Lee, The Fine Art of Propaganda (1939) which examined the speeches of Father Coughlin.

Among his academic appointments, Lee served as chair of the Sociology and Anthropology departments at Wayne University from 1942 to 1947, and as chair of the Sociology and Anthropology department at Brooklyn College from 1951 to 1957. In 1976, he co-founded the Association for Humanist Sociology with his wife, Elizabeth Briant Lee. He also served as president of the American Sociological Association (1976–1977), said to have been installed by a mobilisation of left-wing sociologists. In 1973 he was one of the signers of the Humanist Manifesto II.

Lee died of congestive heart failure at his home in Madison, New Jersey, on May 19, 1992.

== Publications ==
- 1937: The Daily Newspaper in America: the evolution of a social instrument via Internet Archive
- 1939: (with Elizabeth Briant Lee) The Fine Art of Propaganda
- 1943: (with Norman D. Humphrey) Race Riot, Detroit 1943,
- 1946: (as editor) New Outline of the Principles of Sociology via Internet Archive
- 1952: How to Understand Propaganda.
- 1954: Fraternities without Brotherhood
- 1966: Multivalent Man.
- 1973: Toward Humanist Sociology
- 1983: Terrorism in Northern Ireland
- 1976: Sociology for Whom?
- 1988: Sociology for People: toward a caring profession

== See also ==
- Humanity & Society - Sociology journal established in 1977
