= Antinaturalism (sociology) =

Antinaturalism is a view in sociology and other disciplines which states that nature and society are different. The ideas first developed in the field of history in the works of Wilhelm Dilthey and Heinrich Rickert, and it was applied to sociology by Max Weber. Antinaturalists believe that, unlike the natural sciences, there is no way in the social sciences to gain certainty. Social sciences are thus the study of meaning and not just facts.

== See also ==
- Antipositivism, to which it is closely related
- Sociological naturalism, which is its opposite
