= Antipositivism =

Theoretical stance in social science

In social science, antipositivism (also interpretivism, negativism or antinaturalism) is a theoretical stance which proposes that the social realm cannot be studied with the methods of investigation utilized within the natural sciences, and that investigation of the social realm requires a different epistemology. Fundamental to that antipositivist epistemology is the belief that the concepts and language researchers use in their research shape their perceptions of the social world they are investigating and seeking to define.

Interpretivism (anti-positivism) developed among researchers dissatisfied with post-positivism, the theories of which they considered too general and ill-suited to reflect the nuance and variability found in human interaction. Because the values and beliefs of researchers cannot fully be removed from their inquiry, interpretivists believe research on human beings by human beings cannot yield objective results. Thus, rather than seeking an objective perspective, interpretivists look for meaning in the subjective experiences of individuals engaging in social interaction. Many interpretivist researchers immerse themselves in the social context they are studying, seeking to understand and formulate theories about a community or group of individuals by observing them from the inside. Interpretivism is an inductive practice influenced by philosophical frameworks such as hermeneutics, phenomenology, and symbolic interactionism. Interpretive methods are used in many fields of the social sciences, including human geography, sociology, political science, cultural anthropology, among others.

== History ==
Beginning with Giambattista Vico, in the early eighteenth century, and later with Montesquieu, the study of natural history and human history were separate fields of intellectual enquiry. Natural history is not under human control, whereas human history is a human creation. As such, antipositivism is informed by an epistemological distinction between the natural world and the social realm. The natural world can only be understood by its external characteristics, whereas the social realm can be understood externally and internally, and thus can be known.

In the early nineteenth century, intellectuals, led by the Hegelians, questioned the prospect of empirical social analysis. Karl Marx died before the establishment of formal social science, but nonetheless rejected the sociological positivism of Auguste Comte—despite his attempt to establish a historical materialist science of society.

The enhanced positivism of Émile Durkheim served as foundation of modern academic sociology and social research, yet retained many mechanical elements of its predecessor. Hermeneuticians such as Wilhelm Dilthey theorized in detail on the distinction between natural and social science ('Geisteswissenschaft'), whilst neo-Kantian philosophers such as Heinrich Rickert maintained that the social realm, with its abstract meanings and symbolisms, is inconsistent with scientific methods of analysis. Edmund Husserl, meanwhile, negated positivism through the rubric of phenomenology.

At the turn of the twentieth century, the first wave of German sociologists formally introduced verstehende (interpretive) sociological antipositivism, proposing research should concentrate on human cultural norms, values, symbols, and social processes viewed from a resolutely subjective perspective. As an antipositivist, however, one seeks relationships that are not as "ahistorical, invariant, or generalizable" as those pursued by natural scientists.

The interaction between theory (or constructed concepts) and data is always fundamental in social science and this subjection distinguishes it from physical science. Durkheim himself noted the importance of constructing concepts in the abstract (e.g. "collective consciousness" and "social anomie") in order to form workable categories for experimentation. Both Weber and Georg Simmel pioneered the verstehen (or 'interpretative') approach toward social science; a systematic process in which an outside observer attempts to relate to a particular cultural group, or indigenous people, on their own terms and from their own point of view.

[Sociology is ] ... the science whose object is to interpret the meaning of social action and thereby give a causal explanation of the way in which the action proceeds and the effects which it produces. By 'action' in this definition is meant the human behaviour when and to the extent the agent or agents see it as subjectively meaningful ... the meaning to which we refer may be either (a) the meaning actually intended either by an individual agent on a particular historical occasion or by a number of agents on an approximate average in a given set of cases, or (b) the meaning attributed to the agent or agents, as types, in a pure type constructed in the abstract. In neither case is the 'meaning' thought of as somehow objectively 'correct' or 'true' by some metaphysical criterion. This is the difference between the empirical sciences of action, such as sociology and history, and any kind of a priori discipline, such as jurisprudence, logic, ethics, or aesthetics whose aim is to extract from their subject-matter 'correct' or 'valid' meaning.

— Max Weber, The Nature of Social Action 1922

Through the work of Simmel in particular, sociology acquired a possible character beyond positivist data-collection or grand, deterministic systems of structural law. Relatively isolated from the sociological academy throughout his lifetime, Simmel presented idiosyncratic analyses of modernity more reminiscent of the phenomenological and existential writers than of Comte or Durkheim, paying particular concern to the forms of, and possibilities for, social individuality. His sociology engaged in a neo-Kantian critique of the limits of human perception.

Antipositivism thus holds there is no methodological unity of the sciences: the three goals of positivism – description, control, and prediction – are incomplete, since they lack any understanding. Science aims at understanding causality so control can be exerted. If this succeeded in sociology, those with knowledge would be able to control the ignorant and this could lead to social engineering.

This perspective has led to controversy over how one can draw the line between subjective and objective research, much less draw an artificial line between environment and human organization (see environmental sociology), and influenced the study of hermeneutics. The base concepts of antipositivism have expanded beyond the scope of social science, in fact, phenomenology has the same basic principles at its core. Simply put, positivists see sociology as a science, while anti-positivists do not.

=== Frankfurt School ===
The antipositivist tradition continued in the establishment of critical theory, particularly the work associated with the Frankfurt School of social research. Antipositivism would be further facilitated by rejections of 'scientism'; or science as ideology. Jürgen Habermas argues, in his On the Logic of the Social Sciences (1967), that

the positivist thesis of unified science, which assimilates all the sciences to a natural-scientific model, fails because of the intimate relationship between the social sciences and history, and the fact that they are based on a situation-specific understanding of meaning that can be explicated only hermeneutically ... access to a symbolically prestructured reality cannot be gained by observation alone.

The sociologist Zygmunt Bauman argued that

our innate tendency to express moral concern and identify with the Other's wants is stifled in modernity by positivistic science and dogmatic bureaucracy. If the Other does not 'fit in' to modernity's approved classifications, it is liable to be extinguished.

== See also ==
- Critical theory
- Grounded theory
- Holism
- Humanistic sociology
- Methodological dualism
- Philosophy of social science
- Poststructuralism
- Social action
- Sociology of science
- Symbolic interactionism
