= Practice theory =

Body within anthropology and sociology

Practice theory (or praxeology, theory of social practices) is a body of social theory within anthropology and sociology that explains society and culture as the result of structure and individual agency. Practice theory emerged in the late 20th century and was first outlined in the work of the French sociologist Pierre Bourdieu.

Practice theory developed in reaction to the Structuralist school of thought, developed by social scientists including Claude Lévi-Strauss, who saw human behavior and organization systems as products of innate universal structures that reflect the mental structures of humans. Structuralist theory asserted that these structures governed all human societies.

Practice theory is also built on the concept of agency. For practice theorists, the individual agent is an active participant in the formation and reproduction of their social world.

== History ==
In 1972, French sociologist Pierre Bourdieu published Esquisse d'une théorie de la pratique (published in English as Outline of a Theory of Practice in 1977), which emerged from his ethnographic field work in French-occupied Algeria among the Kabyle at the outbreak of the Algerian War of Independence. The original goal of this work was to understand Algerian culture and its internal rules and laws in an effort to understand the conflict. Bourdieu later rejected the idea that culture and social life can be reduced to the acting-out of rules and the primacy of social structures over the individual. Instead, Bourdieu argues, culture and society are better understood as the product of dynamic interactions between social actors and structure. Anthony Giddens and Michel de Certeau were also foundational to the theory in the late 1970s and 1980s.

== Premise ==
Practices are conceptualized as "what people do," or an individual's performance carried out in everyday life. Bourdieu's theory of practice sets up a relationship between structure and the habitus and practice of the individual agent, dealing with the "relationship between the objective structures and the cognitive and motivating structures which they produce and which tend to reproduce them". What is perceived and experienced as culture is the result of dynamic interaction of internal and external structures, individual performance (practice), and strategy (strategy is based on existing structures, but it exists from the actions of individuals seeking to pursue their own interests). Bourdieu describes structure as the "products of historical practices and are constantly reproduced and transformed by historical practices whose productive principle is itself the product of the structures which it consequently tends to reproduce." According to practice theory, social actors are not just shaped by their social world, they shape it as well. Since Bourdieu's formulation, practice theory has been expanded by sociologists, anthropologists, international relation scholars, and feminist scholars, among others.

=== Habitus ===
Along with practices, habitus is a key concept in practice theory. Bourdieu defined habitus as "a structuring structure, which organizes practices and the perception of practices" (1984: 170). First proposed by philosopher Marcel Mauss, Bourdieu uses the term habitus to refer to patterns of thought and behavior which are deeply internalized structures. Habitus is composed of social conventions, rules, values, etc., that guide our everyday practices. These mental structures are representations of the external social structures people interact with on a daily basis. They inform our practice and give meaning to the world and are what drives us to behave in accordance with social and cultural conventions. Habitus is also influenced by external individual forces, such as confronting a new social norm, or a new way of doing things. Like structure, habitus is also the product of historical events. Practice theory is also widely used to analyze social behavior in modern societies.

The embodied component of the habitus is the hexis. It is manifested as an individual's gait, gesture, postures, accent etc. A closely related notion to Bourdieu's habitus is Michel Foucault's concept of 'discipline'. Like habitus, discipline 'is structure and power that have been impressed on the body forming permanent dispositions'. In contrast to Bourdieu, though, Foucault laid particular emphasis on the violence through which modern regimes (e.g. prisons and asylums) are used as a form of social control.

Practice theory is also widely used to analyze social behavior in modern societies.

=== Doxa ===
Another important concept to practice theory are doxa, which are the internalized societal or field-specific presuppositions that 'go without saying' and are not up for negotiation. The doxa is a constructed vision of reality so naturalized that it appears to be the only vision of reality. It is the learned, fundamental, deep-founded, unconscious beliefs and values that are taken as self-evident universals and inform an agent's actions and thoughts within a particular field. An example is the belief that a year must have 365 days or that days must be 24 hours long. The field represents a structured social space with its own rules, schemes of domination, legitimate opinions. Bourdieu uses the concept of field instead of analyzing societies solely in terms of classes. For example, fields in modern societies include arts, education, politics, law and economy. Cultural capital is also part of practice theory and is directly related to strategy. It is the intangible assets that enable actors to mobilize cultural authority/power as part of strategy e.g., e.g., competencies, education, intellect, style of speech, dress, social networks,. This is important in terms of an individual's strategy. A later addition to practice theory is structuration, coined by Anthony Giddens.

== In anthropology and sociology ==
Cultural anthropologist Sherry Ortner defines practice theory as "a theory of history. It is a theory of how social beings, with their diverse motives and their diverse intentions, make and transform in which they live." Ortner developed what she terms "cultural schemas" to explain society's structural contradictions and agency. Her engagement with practice theory focuses on how agents "react to, cope with, or actively appropriate" external structures. These responses of agents are bound or enabled by the cultural schemas which are often rooted in the contradictions of society's structure and habitus of the agent. Agents create broader social narratives practices unique to their specific culture from multiple schemas. The many available to agents schemas woven to a social narrative help to "give society its distinctiveness and coherence" Ortner's agent is "loosely structured", their practice is constituted of how they respond to the schemas.

British sociologist Anthony Giddens extended practice theory with his concept of structuration. Structuration is based on his previous work on the Duality of structure, the idea that the agency of social actors and structure are inseparable and co-create one another. Agency, according to Giddens, is neither free will or the intentionality of actions, but the capacity of the agent to act. The agency of individuals is constrained and enabled by structure. In turn, structure is created, transformed, and reproduced through the actions of agents. Giddens identified two forms of consciousness that inform the knowledgeable agent's actions: practical consciousness and discursive consciousness.

== Influenced ==
=== Gender studies ===
Judith Butler's work on gender and sex is based on performance and practice theory. In Gender Trouble (1990) and "Performative Acts and Gender Constitution" (1988), Butler advances their concept of gender performativity. They argue that all gender and sexual identities are constructs. These identities are not real or innately natural and they do not express any inner reality. Instead, gender and sexuality are constituted by performance, meaning the everyday repetition of acts that reaffirm these identities. The individual performs gender and then that identity is validated by society.

=== Communities of practice and learning as practice ===
Jean Lave and Etienne Wenger draw from practice theory to conceptualize communities of practice as a place of learning. Roddick and Ann B. Stahl summarize communities of practice as involving "embodied action and continuously renewed relations between understanding and experience, more and less skilled practitioners, and the objects and communities with which practitioners interact."

Communities of practice center the relationship of the agent, the activity engaged in, and community, which are co-created and relational to one another. Learning and apprenticeship within practice communities are processes that place individual experience and everyday practice in active discourse with the broader context of their society. According to Wenger and Lave, learning is "situated" through practice of novices and expert practitioners. More recent approaches extend the scope to issues such as agency, material, and interaction.

== Other theories of practice ==
=== Schatzki's theory of practice ===
In the 1990s, Theodore Schatzki developed an alternative theory of practice in Social Practices (1996) and The Site of the Social (2002). His basic premise is that people do what makes sense for them to do and derives from the work of Martin Heidegger and Ludwig Wittgenstein. Practices make up people's 'horizon of intelligibility.' Schatzki defines practices as 'open-ended spatial-temporal manifolds of actions' (Schatzki, 2005, p. 471) and also as 'sets of hierarchically organized doings/sayings, tasks and projects'. Such practices consist of four main elements: (1) practical understanding – "knowing how to X, knowing how to identify X-ings, and knowing how to prompt as well as respond to X-ings" (idem, p. 77); (2) rules – "explicit formulations, principles, precepts, and instructions that enjoin, direct or remonstrate people to perform specific actions" (idem, p. 79); (3) teleo-affective structure – "a range of normativized and hierarchically ordered ends, projects and tasks, to varying degrees allied with normativized emotions and even mood" (idem, p. 80); and (4) general understanding.

=== Jaeggi’s theory of social practice ===
Another alternative theory is from philosopher Rahel Jaeggi, in A broad concept of economy - Economy as a social practice and the critique of capitalism (2018). In her theory of social practice, practices take on a comprehensive and broad meaning, being a set of individual recurrent actions that make part of the socio-cultural fabric of society. There are four primary characteristics: (1) social practices aren't just intentional actions that can be informed by explicit or implicit knowledge; (2) social practices are not given facts i.e. it must be interpreted within a specific context, for example “To see someone hiding behind a tree and understand it as part of the game ‘hide and seek’ (and not as hiding from the police) it’s implicit its connection to the set of other practices and their interpretations as other games and the interpretative concept of ‘game’” (3) social practices are regulated by norms which dictate how to carry on a practice and (4) social practices have immanent telos.

Jaeggi seeks to propose a critique of the capitalist economic system that focuses on the economic practices of individuals, making it possible to understand the economic field in the broad sense, since it allows establishing connections between capitalist practices and the practices in other social spheres. Thus, economic practices are conceived as a subcategory of social practices, and are interconnected in various ways with other practices, forming the sociocultural fabric of society. This theoretical conception allows for a critique of the capitalist system based on the judgment of the inherent normative content of economic practices, understanding them as part of the sociocultural fabric and, therefore, flawed in themselves.

== Other important theorists ==
- William Hanks
- Sherry Ortner
- Marshall Sahlins
- Andreas Reckwitz
- Jean Lave
- Davide Nicolini
- Elizabeth Shove
- Silvia Gherardi
- Michel Foucault
- Bruno Latour
- Michel Callon

== Bibliography ==
- Ahearn, Laura M. (2001). "Language and Agency". Annual Review of Anthropology. 30 (1). Annual Reviews: 109–137. doi:10.1146/annurev.anthro.30.1.109. ISSN 0084-6570.
- Archer, Margaret S. (2003). Structure, agency and the internal conversation. Cambridge University Press.
- Bourdieu, Pierre [1972] 1977. Outline of a Theory of Practice. Trans. Richard Nice. Cambridge University Press.
- Bourdieu, Pierre ( 1990). The Logic of Practice. Trans. Richard Nice. Polity Press.
- Calhoun, Craig, Edward LiPuma, and Moishe Postone (1993). Bourdieu: critical perspectives. University of Chicago Press.
- de Certeau, Michel (1984). "Foucault and Bourdieu". In The practice of everyday life. Trans. Rendall S. F.University of California Press.
- Gherardi, S. (2014). How to Conduct a Practice-Based Study: Problems and Methods. Edward Elgar Pub.
- Gherardi, S. (2006). Organizational Knowledge: The Texture of Workplace Learning. Wiley.Giddens, Anthony (1979). Central problems in social theory: Action, structure, and contradiction in social analysis. University of California Press.s
- Jaeggi, Rahel (2018). Economy as social practice. Journal For Cultural Research, 22 (2). https://doi.org/10.1080/14797585.2018.1461355
- Giddens, Anthony (1984). The Constitution Of Society: Outline Of A Theory Of Structuration. Polity Press.
- Moore, Jerry D.(2000). Visions of culture: An introduction to anthropological theories and theorists. Rowman Altamira.
- Morris, Rosalind C. (1995). "All made up: Performance theory and the new anthropology of sex and gender". Annual review of anthropology. 24 (1): 567–592.
- Nicolini, Davide. Practice theory, work, and organization: An introduction. OUP Oxford, 2012
- Ortner, Sherry B. (2006). Anthropology and social theory : culture, power, and the acting subject. Durham: Duke University Press. ISBN 978-0-8223-8845-6. OCLC 262341007.
- Ortner, Sherry B. (2006). "Introduction: Updating Practice Theory". Anthropology and social theory : culture, power, and the acting subject. Durham: Duke University Press. doi:10.2307/j.ctv11hppcg.4. ISBN 978-0-8223-8845-6. OCLC 262341007.
- Roddick, Andrew P.; Stahl, Anne B. "Introduction: Knowledge in Motion".(2016). Knowledge in motion : constellations of learning across time and place. Ed.Andrew Roddick and Anne P. Stahl. Tucson: The University of Arizona Press.
- Turner, Stephen (1994). The Social Theory of Practices: Tradition, Tacit Knowledge, and Presuppositions. University of Chicago Press.
