= Andreas Reckwitz =

German sociologist and cultural scientist

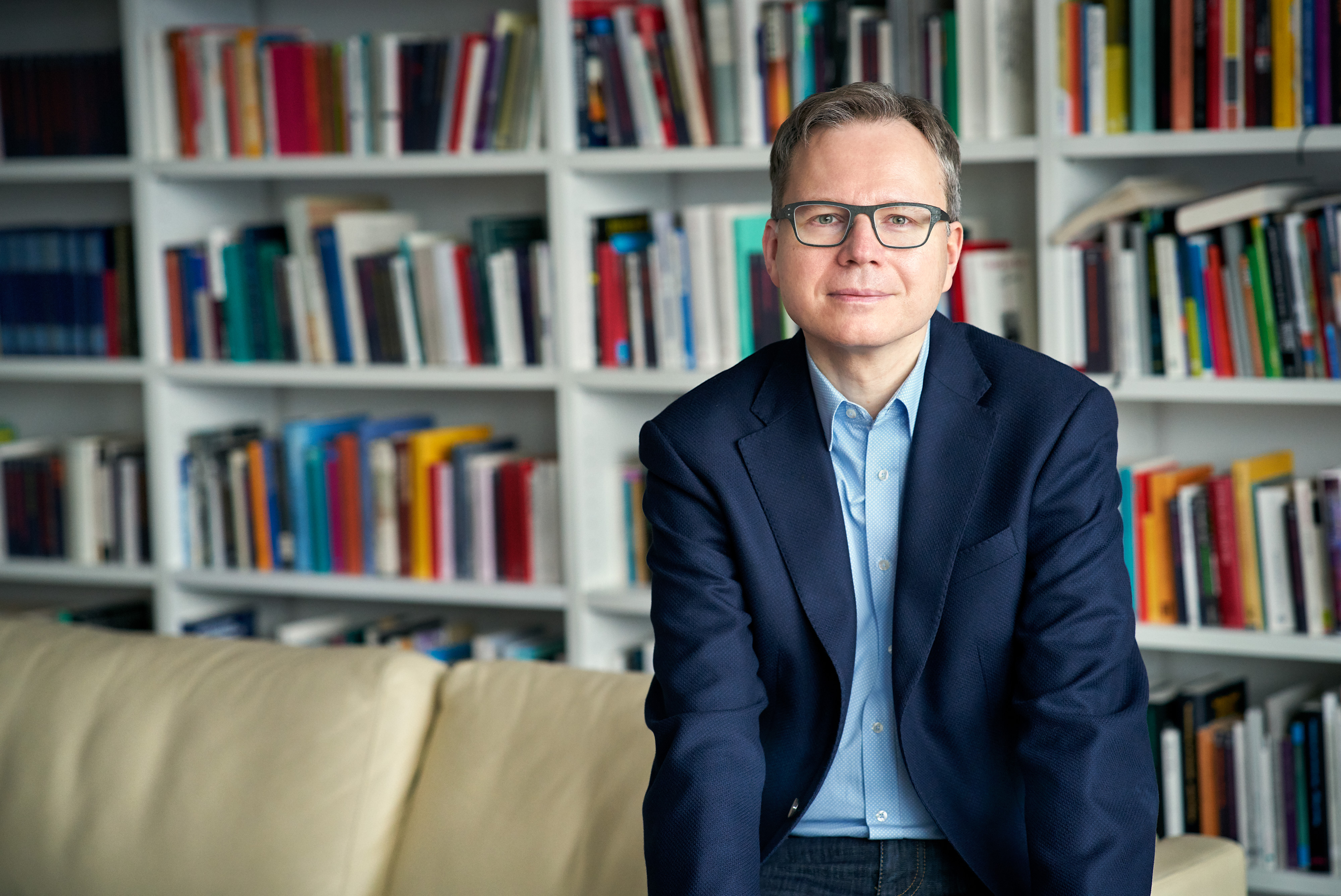
- Born: March 18, 1970 (age 56); Witten, Germany
- Occupations: Sociologist, Professor
- Awards: Gottfried Wilhelm Leibniz Prize (2019)

Academic background
- Education: University of Bonn, University of Hamburg, University of Cambridge
- Doctoral advisor: Anthony Giddens

Academic work
- Institutions: University of Konstanz, European University Viadrina, Humboldt University of Berlin
- Main interests: Social Practice Theory, Subjectivation, Singularization of Social Life, Post-Industrial Society
- Notable works: Die Gesellschaft der Singularitäten (2017), Das Ende der Illusionen (2019), Die Erfindung der Kreativität (2012)

Andreas Reckwitz (18 March 1970 in Witten) is a German sociologist and cultural theorist. He is professor at the institute of social sciences at Humboldt University Berlin.

== Life ==
Reckwitz studied sociology, Political science and philosophy in Bonn, Hamburg and Cambridge. He graduated 1994 in Cambridge, overseen by Anthony Giddens. He achieved his Dr. phil. in 1999 at Hamburg University. From 2001 to 2005 he worked there as assistant professor at the sociological faculty. In 2005 he became professor for sociology and sociology of culture at Konstanz University, 2010 professor for sociology of culture at the Viadrina European University in Frankfurt (Oder). In 2020 Reckwitz became professor for sociology and sociology of culture at Humboldt University in Berlin.

Reckwitz is a prominent proponent of social practice theory and contributed to its development as an encompassing social and cultural theory. This serves as basis for his works on subjectivation, creativity and singularization of the social life.

In 2017 he published his work on the structure of the current late modern society, Die Gesellschaft der Singularitäten. Zum Strukturwandel der Moderne, which was published in English in 2020 as The Society of Singularities. In this book he analyses how economy, work, information technology, lifestyle, classes and politics follow a system which values singularity and devalues non-singularity.

Reckwitz wrote several articles for the newspaper Die Zeit and appeared as an interview partner on the German national radio Deutschlandfunk Kultur discussing current socio-cultural and political trends and issues in western societies.

In 2019 Reckwitz was awarded the Gottfried Wilhelm Leibniz Prize of the German Research Foundation.

== Research and areas of focus ==
=== The transformation of cultural theories ===
In his book published in 2000, based on his doctoral dissertation, Reckwitz presents "cultural theories" as an autonomous explanatory framework in sociological theory. He distinguishes between four concepts of culture (normative, holistic, differentiation-theoretical, and meaning-oriented) and builds upon the meaning-oriented concept of culture. He contrasts cultural theories with action explanations based on utilitarianism and norms: cultural theories explain action by referring to knowledge orders.

In contrast to utilitarian theories of action, cultural theories posit that action is not solely motivated by individual interests or norms, but by cognitive and symbolic orders that structure how individuals perceive the world.

Reckwitz develops two strands of cultural theory in social sciences in detail, one phenomenological-interpretative (Schütz, Goffman, Geertz, Taylor) and the other structuralist (Lévi-Strauss, Bourdieu). The first is subjectivist in nature, while the second is objectivist. He identifies "practice theory" or praxeology as a synthesis of both, overcoming both mentalism (localizing culture in the mind) and textualism (localizing culture in discourses).

Practice theory allows for the overcoming of the dichotomy between the subjectivism of interpretative approaches and the objectivism of structuralist approaches, by proposing a vision where social practices are both carriers of meanings and structured by recurring patterns of bodily and material actions.

=== The hybrid subject ===
Reckwitz develops a historical sociology of forms of subjectivation that have shaped modernity since the 18th century. He seeks to identify the hegemonic "subject cultures" in three areas: labor, personal relationships, and technologies of the self. Three historically successive subject cultures emerge: the bourgeois subject of the 18th and 19th centuries, the employed subject of the industrial society of modernity, and the postmodern subject (after 1980). Each of these subject cultures is contradictory and unstable: the bourgeois subject (morality and autonomy), the employed subject (social and aesthetic orientation), and the postmodern subject (creativity and entrepreneurship). Reckwitz highlights the role of cultural and aesthetic counter-movements in these changes, such as the romantic, the avant-garde, and the counterculture.

Cultural counter-movements, such as Romanticism, artistic avant-gardes, or the 1960s counterculture, played a decisive role in transforming forms of subjectivation, offering alternatives to dominant models.

=== The invention of creativity ===
In his book published in 2012, Reckwitz explores how creativity has become a dominant social expectation in late modern society. He introduces the idea of a "creativity dispositif" centered around a regime of the aesthetic new. This dispositif involves a constellation of producers and audiences that define what is considered new.

Creativity is no longer an exceptional attribute reserved for artists; it has become a generalized social norm in late modern society. To be creative now means participating in the production of the new, whether in the arts, the economy, or everyday life.

Reckwitz shows how the field of art has served as a model for this dispositif. The development of the art field, changes in management discourse, the creative industries, the media star system, and transformations in psychology and urban planning have all contributed to the formation of this creativity dispositif.

The artistic field has played a major role in the spread of the creativity regime. It is the artistic practices, with their constant quest for novelty, that have inspired other fields to adopt a similar logic of innovation and singularity.

He concludes by highlighting the inherent tensions within this culture of creative expectation.

If creativity is now a generalized expectation, it simultaneously generates tensions: individuals find themselves caught in an endless race for innovation, which can lead to psychological pressure and a quest for recognition that is never fully satisfied.

=== The society of singularities ===
In his book Die Gesellschaft der Singularitäten published in 2017, Reckwitz analyzes the structure of late modern society through the fields of economy, labor, digital technologies, lifestyles/classes, and politics.

Cultural production has shifted from a logic of standardization to a logic of singularization, where the production of uniqueness and difference has become a central goal.

He identifies a "social logic of singularization" in late modernity, a system that values uniqueness and devalues what is not singular.

Singularity becomes a key value in a society that values individuality, where goods, services, and even people must stand out through unique qualities. This phenomenon extends to culture, the economy, and also social life, where each individual seeks to assert their distinctiveness.

Reckwitz attributes this singularization to economic (post-industrial capitalism), technological (digitization as a cultural machine), and sociocultural factors (the new middle class as the dominant milieu). He concludes that singularization leads to social polarization, marked by valuation and devaluation conflicts, which are characteristic of late modern society.

The social polarization we observe today is largely related to the competition for the recognition of singularity. This struggle for recognition produces deep inequalities, where those who fail to distinguish themselves are devalued.

=== The end of illusions ===
In his 2019 work Das Ende der Illusionen, Reckwitz continues the reflection begun in Die Gesellschaft der Singularitäten. The book consists of five essays that analyze the consequences of the transition from industrial modernity to the post-industrial society of singularities. It addresses the dynamics between hyperculture and cultural essentialism in late modern culture, the emergence of a three-class society, and the asymmetries of cognitive capitalism.

We live in an era where culture is both hyper-cultural, with a constant flow of creations and differentiations, and essentialist, where fixed cultural identities are reaffirmed in the face of the uncertainty of the modern world.

The final essays examine the spiral of disillusionment linked to self-commercialization and self-realization, as well as the limits of liberalism as a political paradigm.

The ideal of self-realization in the society of singularities ultimately generates a spiral of disillusionment, as the incessant quest for recognition and singularity becomes an unbearable burden for individuals.

Reckwitz concludes by proposing a model of "embedded liberalism," inspired by Karl Polanyi, which aims to re-integrate economic, cultural, and political dynamics into collective social frameworks.

In light of the limits of open liberalism, it is necessary to reintegrate economic and cultural dynamics into broader social frameworks, in order to create a balance between individual freedom and collective solidarity.

== Selected publications ==
- Verlust. Ein Grundproblem der Moderne. Suhrkamp, Berlin 2024, ISBN 978-3-518-58822-2.
- The Society of Singularities. Polity, Cambridge 2020.
  - Translated from Die Gesellschaft der Singularitäten. Zum Strukturwandel der Moderne. Suhrkamp, Berlin 2017, ISBN 978-3-518-58706-5
- The End of Illusions: Politics, Economics and Culture in Late Modernity. Polity, Cambridge 2021.
  - Translated from Das Ende der Illusionen. Politik, Ökonomie und Kultur in der Spätmoderne. Suhrkamp, Berlin 2019. ISBN 978-3-518-12735-3.
- Kreativität und soziale Praxis. Studien zur Sozial- und Gesellschaftstheorie. transcript, Bielefeld 2016, ISBN 978-3-8376-3345-0 (collected articles).
- The Invention of Creativity. Modern Society and the Culture of the New, Polity, Cambridge 2017, ISBN 978-0-7456-9703-1.
  - Translated from Die Erfindung der Kreativität. Zum Prozess gesellschaftlicher Ästhetisierung. Suhrkamp, Berlin 2012, ISBN 978-3-518-29595-3
- Unscharfe Grenzen. Perspektiven der Kultursoziologie. transcript, Bielefeld 2008, ISBN 978-3-89942-917-6.
- Subjekt. transcript, Bielefeld 2008, ISBN 978-3-89942-570-3.
- Das hybride Subjekt. Eine Theorie der Subjektkulturen von der bürgerlichen Moderne zur Postmoderne. Velbrück Wissenschaft, Weilerswist 2006, ISBN 3-938808-07-1. (habilitation dissertation)
- Die Transformation der Kulturtheorien. Zur Entwicklung eines Theorieprogramms. Velbrück Wissenschaft, Weilerswist 2000, ISBN 3-934730-15-9.
- Struktur. Zur sozialwissenschaftlichen Analyse von Regeln und Regelmäßigkeiten. Westdeutscher Verlag, Opladen/ Wiesbaden 1997, ISBN 3-531-13000-5.

As editor

- with Sophia Prinz and Hilmar Schäfer: Ästhetik und Gesellschaft. Suhrkamp, Berlin 2015, ISBN 978-3-518-29718-6.
- with Stephan Moebius: Poststrukturalistische Sozialwissenschaften. Suhrkamp, Frankfurt am Main 2008, ISBN 978-3-518-29469-7.
- with Thorsten Bonacker: Kulturen der Moderne. Soziologische Perspektiven der Gegenwart. Campus Verlag, Frankfurt am Main/ New York 2007, ISBN 978-3-593-38354-5.
- with Holger Sievert: Interpretation, Konstruktion, Kultur. Ein Paradigmenwechsel in den Sozialwissenschaften. Westdeutscher Verlag, Opladen/ Wiesbaden 1999, ISBN 3-531-13309-8.
