= Mesosociology =

Study of intermediate social forces

Mesosociology is the study of intermediate (meso) social forces and stratification such as income, age, gender, race, ethnicity, organizations and geographically circumscribed communities.

Mesosociology lies between analysis of large-scale macro forces such as the economy or human societies (which is a domain of macrosociology), and everyday human social interactions on a small scale (a territory of microsociology).

== Social control ==
Meso-level forces of social control include organizations and communities. The organizations are middle-level structures of control. One type is a comprehensive institution, an organization in which people are confined until they can adhere to society's norms, including prisons and mental hospitals. Another type of middle level organization is the reintegration structure. This structure rehabilitates those who do not conform. These include rehabilitation centers for drugs and alcohol. A final type of organization is a safety-valve organization. These provide outlets for behavior that is considered deviant but cannot be eradicated from society, including prostitution. Communities also are instruments of social control. Things that are controlled by local governments are often the most visible signs of social control in a community, such as a police force and the organization of neighborhoods.
