= Double hermeneutic =

Proposed connection between lay concepts and social sciences

The double hermeneutic is the theory, expounded by sociologist Anthony Giddens, that everyday "lay" concepts and those from the social sciences have a two-way relationship. A common example is the idea of social class, a social-scientific category that has entered into wide use in society. Since the 1970s, held to be a distinguishing feature of the social sciences, the double hermeneutic has become a criterion for demarcating the human/social from the natural sciences.

== Overview ==
Anthony Giddens (1982) argues that there is an important difference between the natural and social sciences. In the natural sciences, scientists try to understand and theorize about the way the natural world is structured. The understanding is one-way; that is, while we seek to understand the actions of minerals or chemicals, chemicals and minerals don't seek to develop an understanding of us. He refers to this as the "single hermeneutic". (Hermeneutic means interpretation or understanding.) By contrast, the social sciences are engaged in the double hermeneutic. The various social sciences study people and society, although the way they do so is different. Some social sciences such as sociology don't just study what people do, they also study how people understand their world, and how that understanding shapes their practice. Because people can think, make choices, and use new information to revise their understandings (and hence their practice), they can use the knowledge and insights of social science to change their practice.

In outlining his notion of the double hermeneutic, Giddens explains that while philosophers and social scientists have often considered the way "in which lay concepts obstinately intrude into the technical discourse of social science," ... "(f)ew have considered the matter the other way around." He explains that "the concepts of the social sciences are not produced about an independently constituted subject-matter, which continues regardless of what these concepts are. The findings of the social sciences very often enter constitutively into the world they describe."

Philosopher Dimitri Ginev said that since the 1970s, discussions about double hermeneutics in postempiricist epistemology and in critical theory have led to "a tendency to oppose the methodological to the ontological reading of double hermeneutics", the methodological standpoint traditionally understanding double hermeneutics as a differentia specifica of human-scientific inquiry.

== See also ==
- Goodhart's law
- Interpretative phenomenological analysis
- Reflexivity (social theory)
