= Theodore Schatzki =

American philosopher

- Known for: Practice theory

Academic background
- Education: Oxford University, UC Berkeley

Academic work
- Discipline: Philosophy
- Institutions: University of Kentucky

Theodore Schatzki is a professor of philosophy and geography at the University of Kentucky. He has written extensively on practice theory. His work has developed an alternative theory of practice, influenced by Martin Heidegger and Ludwig Wittgenstein, that people do what makes sense for them to do.

== Early life and education ==
In 1977, Schatzki received his undergraduate degree in applied mathematics at Harvard University. He received degrees in philosophy from Oxford University in 1979 and UC Berkeley in 1982 and again in 1986.

== Career ==
He has held various academic positions, including senior associate dean in the College of Arts & Sciences, chair of the Department of Philosophy, and co-founder and former co-director of the University of Kentucky's Committee on Social Theory. Schatzki's research focuses on theorizing social life, particularly within the field of practice theory. He has written several books, co-edited multiple volumes, and authored numerous articles on topics such as flat ontology, social space, institutional theory, and materiality. His current research interests include practice-theory-of-institutions and blockchain, digital mediation of social relations, and the role of space in digitalized society. He has been a research fellow of the Fulbright Commission and the Alexander von Humboldt Foundation, and has been a visiting professor at various universities around the world. In 2018, he received an honorary doctorate from Aalborg University in Denmark.

== Influence ==
He was listed as the 43rd most cited philosopher in the world in 2020 based on Scopus citations, and the 13th in 2021.

== Bibliography ==
- Social Practices (1996) Cambridge University Press, ISBN 9780511527470
- The Site of the Social (2002) Penn State University Press, ISBN 978-0-271-02292-5
- Martin Heidegger: Theorist of Space (2007) Franz Steiner Verlag, ISBN 351511761X
- The Timespace of Human Activity (2010), Lexington Books, ISBN 0739180673
- Social Change in a Material World (2019), Routledge, ISBN 9780367144531

== See also ==
- Posthumanism#Philosophical posthumanism
