= Dimitri Ginev =

Bulgarian philosopher (1956–2021)

- Born: 3 July 1956; Varna, PR Bulgaria
- Died: 5 June 2021; Sofia, Bulgaria

Education
- Education: Bulgarian Academy of Sciences

Philosophical work
- Era: 21st-century philosophy
- Region: Western philosophy
- School: Continental philosophy Hermeneutics
- Institutions: University of Sofia; University of Pittsburgh; University of Konstanz
- Main interests: Cultural studies Philosophy of science
- Notable ideas: Cognitive existentialism, hermeneutic realism, hermeneutics of science

Dimitri Ginev (German: [ˈɡinɛf]; 3 July 1956 – 5 June 2021) was a Bulgarian philosopher who held the position of Professor of History of Discourses in Cultural Studies at St. Kliment Ohridski University. Ginev specialized in philosophy of science, particularly hermeneutic philosophy of science.

== Career ==
Dimitri Ginev habilitated at the Bulgarian Academy of Sciences in 1987 with a thesis on the hermeneutics aspects of post-empirical philosophy of science. He made substantial contributions to hermeneutic philosophy of science, including an ontological conception of social practices and interpretive theory of cultural forms of life. In addition to posts as visiting Fellow in 1990 at the Center for Philosophy of Science, University of Pittsburgh, he participated in various research projects at the University of Marburg, the University of Düsseldorf, and the Ruhr University Bochum. A fellow of the Alexander von Humboldt Foundation at Humboldt University of Berlin, and a Fulbright Scholar at the Catholic University of America, he was, most recently, Senior Fellow of the Zukunftskolleg at the University of Konstanz. In 1992, Ginev founded the international journal Studia Culturologica.

== Work ==
Ginev’s work engages features of hermeneutic philosophizing, and aims at mediating between continental and analytic ways of thinking. The project of this effort at mediation undertakes a gradual change of the established metaphysico-epistemological identities of the sciences in favor of ones shaped by the interpretative reflexivity of the research processes. In sum, the path leads from hermeneutic theory of science via an ontological conception of social practices to an interpretative theory of cultural forms of life.

Ginev’s hermeneutic realism states that the facticity of scientific practices cannot be separated from objectified factuality. From this perspective, reality – as revealed by research practices, here see the work of Patrick Aidan Heelan and Hans-Jörg Rheinberger – manifests itself in the continuous pre-structuring of factual structures.

Ginev also proposed a hermeneutic version of social theory, arguing that a reality sui generis should be attributed to interrelated social practices. In his earlier work, investigating the genesis of cultural forms of life, he justified the peculiarity of the social as an interweaving of practices. The concept of the political elaborated by Ernesto Laclau and Chantal Mouffe plays an important role in shaping this view. His later work on social theory of social practices is oriented more towards practice theory. Criticizing the attachment of the theoretical consideration of social practices to the problem of corporeality, Ginev focuses on expanding the concept of facticity. Theory of the narrativity of social practices, drawn from Ginev's reading of Wilhelm Schapp's philosophy, complements this amplified concept of facticity. Ginev argues that any approach to the facticity of the social requires double hermeneutics, which results from the interaction of a methodological interpretation and a phenomenological constitution theory.

== Books ==
=== English ===
- Scientific Conceptualization and Ontological Difference. Berlin/Boston: de Gruyter, 2019.
- Toward a Hermeneutic Theory of Social Practices: Between Existential Analytic and Social Theory. London/New York: Routledge, 2018.
- Hermeneutic Realism. Reality Within Scientific Inquiry. Frankfurt am Main: Springer, 2016.
- Debating Cognitive Existentialism. Leiden: Brill, 2015.
- Practices and Possibilities. Würzburg: Königshausen & Neumann, 2013.
- The Tenets of Cognitive Existentialism. Athens (OH): Ohio University Press, 2011.
- Steps in Overcoming Scientism. Vienna/Sofia: Idea, 2007.
- The Context of Constitution. Beyond the Edge of Justification. Boston Studies in the Philosophy of Science. Frankfurt am Main: Springer, 2006.
- Critique of Epistemological Reason. Sofia: Akademischer Verlag, 2000.
- A Passage to a Hermeneutic Philosophy of Science. Amsterdam: Rodopi, 1997.
- Essays in Hermeneutics of Science. London: Routledge 2018 [1997].

=== German ===
- Das hermeneutische Projekt Georg Mischs. Wien: Passagen Verlag, 2011.
- Transformationen der Hermeneutik.Würzburg: Königshausen und Neumann, 2008.
- Die Mehrdimensionalität geisteswissenschaftlicher Erfahrung. Essen: Blaue Eule 1995.
- Grundriss einer kritischen Wissenschaftstheorie. New York/Frankfurt am Main: Peter Lang, 1989.

=== French ===
- Entre Hermeneutique et Anthropologie. Bern/Wien/Paris: Peter Lang, 2004.

Editor and Contributor

- The Multidimensionality of Hermeneutic Phenomenology. Frankfurt am Main: Springer, 2013. [With Babette Babich]
- Die Geisteswissenschaften im europäischen Diskurs. Band 2, StudienVerlag, 2010.
- Aspekte der Phänomenologischen Theorie der Wissenschaften. Würzburg: Königshausen & Neumann, 2008.
- Bulgarian Studies in the Philosophy of Science. Springer, 2003.
- Issues and Images in the Philosophy of Science (Boston Studies in the Philosophy of Science, Vol. 192), Dordrecht: Kluwer, 1997. [With Robert Cohen]
- Cultural Aspects of the Modernization Process. Oslo: TMV-senteret, 1996. [With Francis Sejersted and Kostadinka Simeonova]
- Die Verschmelzung der Untersuchungsbereiche. Formen des Dialogs zwischen Kulturwissenschaften und Wissenschaftstheorie. Frankfurt am Main/Berlin: Peter Lang, 1993.
