= The Transformation of Intimacy =

1992 book by Anthony Giddens

- Author: Anthony Giddens
- Publisher: Stanford University Press
- Publication date: 1992
- Pages: 216

The Transformation of Intimacy is a book by Anthony Giddens published in 1992.
