= Duality of structure =

Key concept of structuration theory

Duality of structure is one of Anthony Giddens' coined phrases and main propositions in his explanation of structuration theory.

== Description ==
The basis of the duality lies in the relationship the agency has with the structure. In the duality, the agency has much more influence on its lived environment than past structuralist theory had granted. The key to Giddens' explanation is his focus on the knowledgeability of the agent and the fact that the agency cannot exist or be analysed separately from its structure. They can only exist as a duality. The structural properties which he calls modalities help illustrate the dimensions of the duality.

"By the duality of structure I mean that the structural properties of social systems are both the medium and the outcome of the practices that constitute those systems."

The structure has both rules and resources or constraints and enabling qualities. Language is often used to exemplify these modalities. The system of interaction includes in itself "rules" of the language such as syntax but also leaves room for interpretations or the creation of completely new words. The system of interaction is responsible for maintaining a certain standard of consistency in order for the language to make sense to both the speaker and the interpreter. At the same time, the completeness of the language can always be manipulated and changed through interaction by the agent.

The phrase is used in Chomsky by John Lyons to illustrate the differences between human and animal communication. It is described there as "two levels of grammatical structure." The first being syntactic and the second being phonemes.
