= Macrosociology =

Sociological theories and approaches that focus on large-scale aspects of society

Macrosociology is a large-scale approach to sociology, emphasizing the analysis of social systems and populations at the structural level, often at a necessarily high level of theoretical abstraction. Though macrosociology does concern itself with individuals, families, and other constituent aspects of a society, it does so in relation to larger social system of which such elements form a part. The macrosociological approach can also analyze generalized collectivities (such as "the city" or "the church").

In contrast, microsociology focuses on the individual social agency. Macrosociology, however, deals with broad societal trends that can later be applied to smaller features of society, or vice versa. To differentiate, macrosociology deals with issues such as war as a whole; 'distress of Third-World countries'; poverty on a national/international level; and environmental deprivation, whereas microsociology analyses issues such as (for example) the individual features of war (e.g. camaraderie, one's pleasure in violence, etc.); the role of women in third-world countries; poverty's effect on "the family"; and how immigration impacts a country's environment.

A "society" can be considered as a collective of human populations that are politically autonomous, in which members engage in a broad range of cooperative activities. The people of Germany, for example, can be deemed "a society", whereas people with German heritage as a whole, including those who populate other countries, would not be considered a society per se.

== Theoretical strategies ==
There are a number of theoretical strategies within contemporary macrosociology, though four approaches, in particular, have the most influence:

- Idealist Strategy: Attempts to explain the basic features of social life by reference to the creative capacity of the human mind. "Idealists believe that human uniqueness lies in the fact that humans attach symbolic meanings to their actions."
- Materialist Strategy: Attempts to explain the basic features of human social life in terms of the practical, material conditions of their existence, including the nature of a physical environment; the level of technology; and the organization of an economic system.
- Functionalist Strategy (or structural functionalism): Functionalism essentially states that societies are complex systems of interrelated and interdependent parts, and each part of a society significantly influences the others. Moreover, each part of society exists because it has a specific function to perform in contributing to the society as a whole. As such, societies tend toward a state of equilibrium or homeostasis, and if there is a disturbance in any part of the society then the other parts will adjust to restore the stability of the society as a whole.
- Conflict Theoretical Strategy (or conflict theory): Rejects the idea that societies tend toward some basic consensus of harmony in which the features of society work for everyone's good. Rather, the basic structure of society is determined by individuals and groups acquiring scarce resources to satisfy their own needs and wants, thus creating endless conflicts.

== Historical macrosociology ==
Historical macrosociology can be understood as an approach that uses historical knowledge to try to solve some of the problems seen in the field of macrosociology. As globalization has affected the world, it has also influenced historical macrosociology, leading to the development of two distinct branches:

- Comparative and historical sociology (CHS): a branch of historical macrosociology that bases its analysis on states, searching for "generalizations about common properties and principles of variation among instances across time and space." As of recently, it has been argued that globalization poses a threat to the CHS way of thinking because it often leads to the dissolution of distinct states.
- Political Economy of the World-Systems (PEWS): a branch of historical macrosociology that bases its analysis on the systems of states, searching for "generalizations about interdependencies among a system's components and of principles of variation among systemic conditions across time and space."

Historical macrosociologists include:

- Charles Tilly: developed theory of CHS, in which analysis is based on national states.
- Immanuel Wallerstein: developed world systems theory, in which analysis is based on world capitalist systems.

== Linking micro- and macro-sociology ==
Perhaps the most highly developed integrative effort to link micro- and macro-sociological phenomena is found in Anthony Giddens's theory of structuration, in which "social structure is defined as both constraining and enabling of human activity as well as both internal and external to the actor."

Attempts to link micro and macro phenomena are evident in a growing body of empirical research. Such work appears to follow Giddens' view of the constraining and enabling nature of social structure for human activity and the need to link structure and action. "It appears safe to say that while macrosociology will always remain a central component of sociological theory and research, increasing effort will be devoted to creating workable models that link it with its microcounterpart."

== See also ==
- Base and superstructure
- Cliodynamics
- General systems theory
- Modernization theory
- Sociocybernetics
- Structure and agency
- Systems philosophy
