= Anthony Giddens =

British sociologist (born 1938)

The Lord Giddens MAE
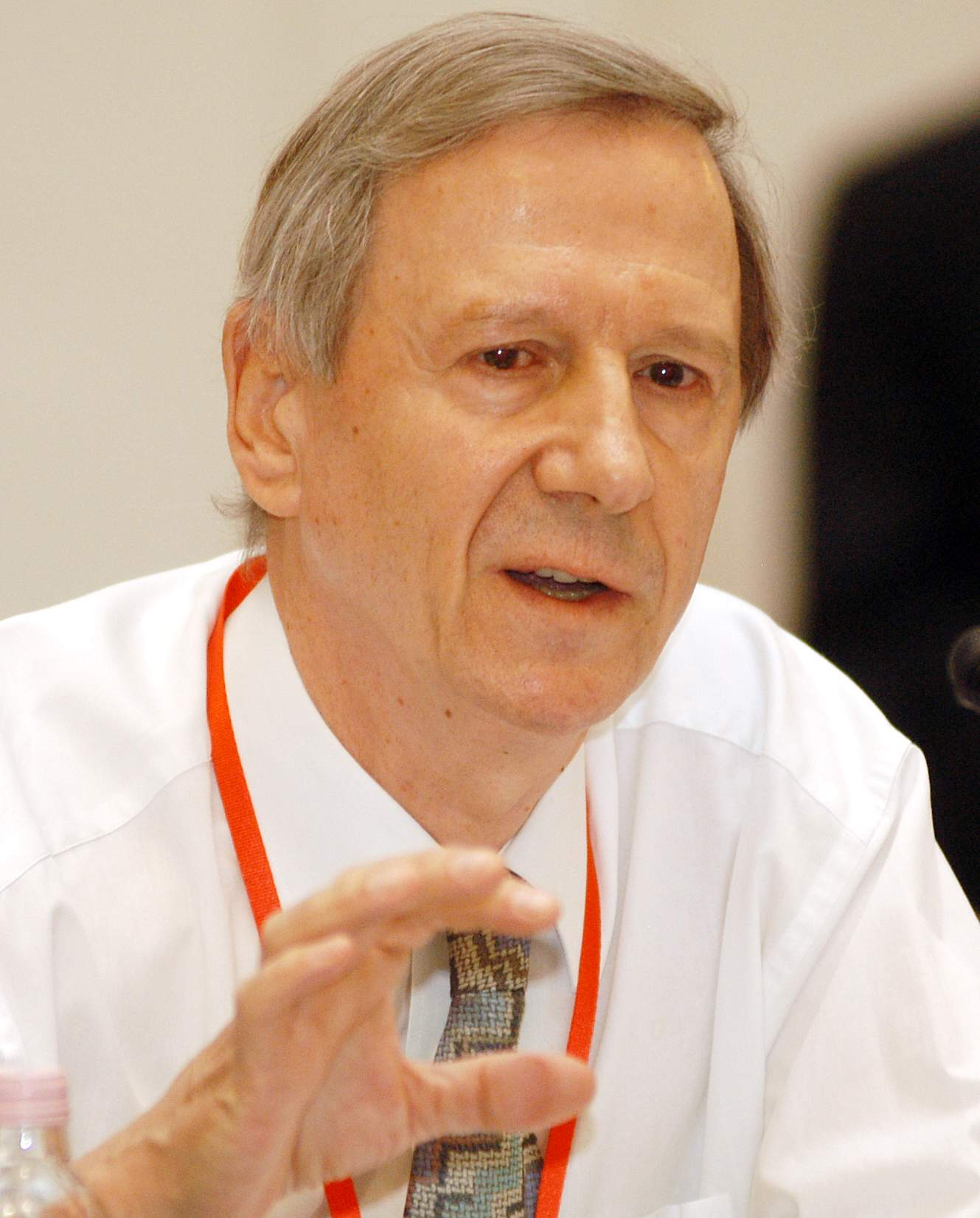
- Giddens in 2004
- Born: Anthony Giddens; 18 January 1938 (age 88); London, England
- Other name: Tony Giddens
- Political party: Labour

Academic background
- Education: University of Hull (BSc); London School of Economics (MSc); King's College, Cambridge (PhD)
- Thesis: Sport and Society in Contemporary Britain (1961)
- Academic advisor: David Lockwood
- Influences: Ulrich Beck; Cornelius Castoriadis; Noam Chomsky; Wilhelm Dilthey; Émile Durkheim; Norbert Elias; Michel Foucault; Sigmund Freud; Erving Goffman; Jürgen Habermas; Claude Lévi-Strauss; Niklas Luhmann; Karl Marx; Robert K. Merton; Talcott Parsons; Alfred Schütz; Max Weber

Academic work
- Discipline: Sociology
- Sub-discipline: Political sociology; social theory
- Institutions: University of Leicester; King's College, Cambridge; London School of Economics
- Doctoral students: Nigel Dodd
- Notable works: The Constitution of Society (1984); The Third Way (1998)
- Notable ideas: Double hermeneutic; duality of structure; structuration theory; third way; transformation of intimacy
- Influenced: Margaret Archer; Stephen R. Barley; Zygmunt Bauman; Helen A. Berger; Tony Blair; Colin J. McInnes; Wanda Orlikowski; Ferenc Gyurcsány; Jeffrey Weeks; Alexander Wendt

Member of the House of Lords
- Lord Temporal
- Life peerage 16 June 2004

Anthony Giddens, Baron Giddens (born 18 January 1938) is an English sociologist who is known for his theory of structuration and his holistic view of modern societies. He is the author of more than 34 books and was listed, in 2007, as the fifth most cited author in the humanities. He has held academic appointments at universities across the world and has received numerous honorary degrees.

His works are divided into four stages:

The first one involved outlining a new vision of what sociology is, presenting a theoretical and methodological understanding of that field based on a critical reinterpretation of the classics. His major publications of that era include Capitalism and Modern Social Theory (1971) and The Class Structure of the Advanced Societies (1973).

In the second stage, Giddens developed the theory of structuration, an analysis of agency and structure in which primacy is granted to neither. His works of that period, such as New Rules of Sociological Method (1976), Central Problems in Social Theory (1979) and The Constitution of Society (1984), brought him international fame on the sociological arena.

The third stage of Giddens's academic work was concerned with modernity, globalisation and politics, especially the impact of modernity on social and personal life. This stage is reflected by his critique of postmodernity and discussions of a new "utopian-realist" Third Way in politics which is visible in The Consequences of Modernity (1990), Modernity and Self-Identity (1991), The Transformation of Intimacy (1992), Beyond Left and Right (1994) and The Third Way (1998).

In the most recent stage, Giddens has turned his attention to a more concrete range of problems relevant to the evolution of world society, namely environmental issues, focusing especially upon debates about climate change in his book The Politics of Climate Change (2009); the role and nature of the European Union in Turbulent and Mighty Continent (2014); and in a series of lectures and speeches also the nature and consequences of the Digital Revolution.

Giddens served as Director of the London School of Economics from 1997 to 2003, where he is now Emeritus Professor at the Department of Sociology. He is a life fellow of King's College, Cambridge. According to the Open Syllabus Project, Giddens is the most frequently cited author on college syllabi for sociology courses.

== Biography ==
Contrary to what it says on Wikipedia, I was never an adviser to Tony Blair and had no official role – I couldn't as head of the LSE – I was simply involved in some of the networks and circles around them [...] I simply tried my best to contribute my ideas to what an effective centre-left government would look like in contemporary conditions, and that is where the book, The Third Way, came from

— Anthony Giddens, 2017?

Born on 18 January 1938, Giddens was born and raised in Edmonton, London, and grew up in a lower-middle-class family, son of a clerk with London Transport. He attended Minchenden Grammar School. He was the first member of his family to go to university. Giddens received his undergraduate academic degree in joint sociology and psychology at the University of Hull in 1959, followed by a master's degree at the London School of Economics supervised by David Lockwood and Asher Tropp. He later gained a PhD at King's College, Cambridge. In 1961, Giddens started working at the University of Leicester where he taught social psychology. At Leicester, he met Norbert Elias and began to work on his own theoretical position. In 1969, Giddens was appointed to a position at the University of Cambridge, where he later helped create the Social and Political Sciences Committee (SPS, now HSPS).

Giddens worked for many years at Cambridge as a fellow of King's College and was eventually promoted to a full professorship in 1987. He is cofounder of Polity Press (1985). From 1997 to 2003, he was Director of the London School of Economics and a member of the advisory council of the Institute for Public Policy Research. He was also associated with Tony Blair, but was not a direct advisor. He has also been a vocal participant in British political debates, supporting the centre-left Labour Party with media appearances and articles (many of which are published in New Statesman).

He was given a life peerage in June 2004 as Baron Giddens, of Southgate in the London Borough of Enfield and sits in the House of Lords for the Labour Party. He is the recipient of many academic honours.

== Work ==
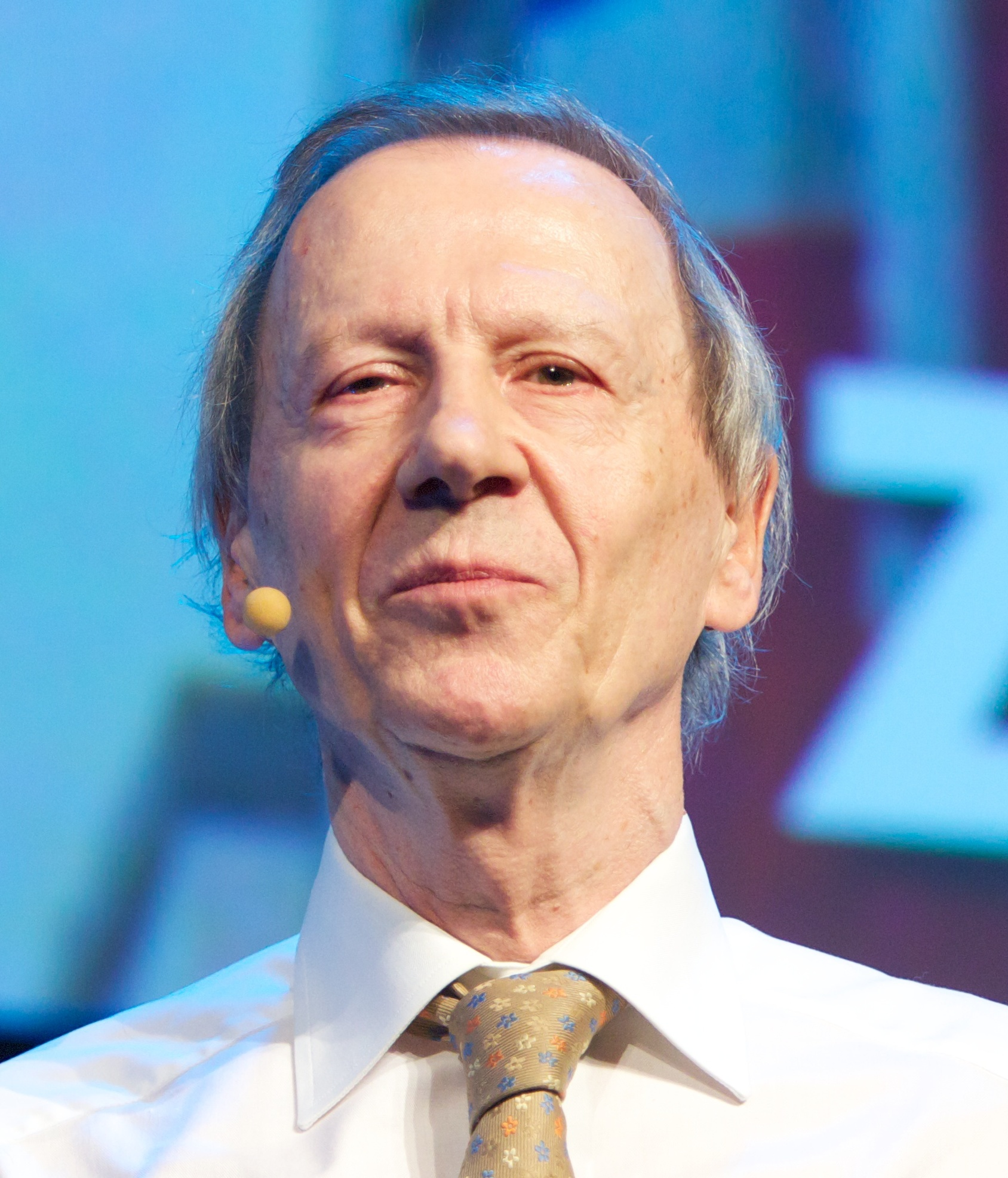
Giddens at the 2011 Zero Emission Resource Organisation conference

=== Overview ===
Giddens, the author of over 34 books and 200 articles, essays and reviews, has contributed and written about most notable developments in the area of social sciences, with the exception of research design and methods. He has written commentaries on most leading schools and figures and has used most sociological paradigms in both micro and macrosociology. His writings range from abstract, metatheoretical problems to very direct and 'down-to-earth' textbooks for students. His textbook, Sociology (9th edition, Polity), has sold over 1 million copies. Finally, he is also known for his interdisciplinary approach. Giddens has commented not only on the developments in sociology, but also in anthropology, archaeology, psychology, philosophy, history, linguistics, economics, social work and most recently political science. In view of his knowledge and works, one may view much of his life's work as a form of grand synthesis of sociological theory.

=== Nature of sociology ===
Before 1976, most of Giddens' writings offered critical commentary on a wide range of writers, schools and traditions. Giddens took a stance against the then-dominant structural functionalism (represented by Talcott Parsons) as well as criticising evolutionism and historical materialism. In Capitalism and Modern Social Theory (1971), he examined the work of Max Weber, Émile Durkheim and Karl Marx, arguing that despite their different approaches each was concerned with the link between capitalism and social life. Giddens emphasised the social constructs of power, modernity and institutions, defining sociology as such: "[T]he study of social institutions brought into being by the industrial transformation of the past two or three centuries."

In New Rules of Sociological Method (1976), the title of which alludes to Durkheim's Rules of the Sociological Method of 1895, Giddens attempted to explain how sociology should be done and addressed a long-standing divide between those theorists who prioritise macro-level studies of social life—looking at the big picture of society—and those who emphasise the micro level—what everyday life means to individuals. In New Rules, he noted that the functionalist approach invented by Durkheim treated society as a reality unto itself not reducible to individuals. He rejected Durkheim's sociological positivism paradigm which attempted to predict how societies operate, ignoring the meanings as understood by individuals. Giddens noted: "Society only has form, and that form only has effects on people, insofar as structure is produced and reproduced in what people do."

Giddens contrasted Durkheim with Weber's approach—interpretative sociology—focused on understanding agency and motives of individuals. In his analysis, he rejects both of those approaches, stating that while society is not a collective reality, nor should the individual be treated as the central unit of analysis. Rather, he uses the logic of hermeneutic tradition from interpretative sociology to argue for the importance of agency in sociological theory, claiming that human social actors are always to some degree acknowledged about what they are doing. Social order is therefore a result of some pre-planned social actions, not automatic evolutionary response. Unlike natural scientists, sociologists have to interpret a social world which is already interpreted by the actors that inhabit it. According to Giddens, there is a duality of structure by which social practice, the principal unit of investigation, has both a structural and an agency-component. The structural environment constrains individual behaviour, but it also makes it possible. He also noted the existence of a specific form of a social cycle. Once sociological concepts are formed, they filter back into everyday world and change the way people think. Because social actors are reflexive and monitor the ongoing flow of activities and structural conditions, they adapt their actions to their evolving understandings. As a result, social scientific knowledge of society will actually change human activities. Giddens calls this two-tiered, interpretive and dialectical relationship between social scientific knowledge and human practices the double hermeneutic. Giddens also stressed the importance of power, which is means to ends, and hence is directly involved in the actions of every person. Power, the transformative capacity of people to change the social and material world, is closely shaped by knowledge and space-time. In New Rules, Giddens specifically wrote:

- Sociology is not about a pre-given universe of objects, the universe is being constituted—or produced by—the active doings of subjects.
- The production and reproduction of society thus has to be treated as a skilled performance on the part of its members.
- The realm of human agency is bounded. Individuals produce society, but they do so as historically located actors, and not under conditions of their own choosing.
- Structures must be conceptualised not only as constraints upon human agency, but as enablers as well.
- Processes of structuration involve an interplay of meanings, norms and power.
- The sociological observer cannot make social life available as phenomenon for observation independently of drawing upon his knowledge of it as a resource whereby he constitutes it as a topic for investigation.
- Immersion in a form of life is the necessary and only means whereby an observer is able to generate such characterisations.
- Sociological concepts thus obey a double hermeneutic.

In sum, the primary tasks of sociological analysis are the following:

1. The hermeneutic explication and mediation of divergent forms of life within descriptive metalanguages of social science.
2. Explication of the production and reproduction of society as the accomplished outcome of human agency.

=== Structuration ===
Giddens' theory of structuration explores the question of whether it is individuals or social forces that shape our social reality. He eschews extreme positions, arguing that although people are not entirely free to choose their own actions and their knowledge is limited, they nonetheless are the agency which reproduces the social structure and leads to social change. His ideas find an echo in the philosophy of the modernist poet Wallace Stevens, who suggests that we live in the tension between the shapes we take as the world acts upon us and the ideas of order that our imagination imposes upon the world. Giddens writes that the connection between structure and action is a fundamental element of social theory, structure and agency are a duality that cannot be conceived of apart from one another and his main argument is contained in his expression duality of structure. At a basic level, this means that people make society, but they are at the same time constrained by it. Action and structure cannot be analysed separately as structures are created, maintained and changed through actions while actions are given meaningful form only through the background of the structure. The line of causality runs in both directions making it impossible to determine what is changing what. In Giddens own words from New Rules, he states: "[S]ocial structures are both constituted by human agency, and yet at the same time are the very medium of this constitution."

In this regard, Giddens defines structures as consisting of rules and resources involving human action. Thus, the rules constrain the actions and the resources make it possible. He also differentiates between systems and structures. Systems display structural properties, but they are not structures themselves. He notes in his article Functionalism: après la lutte (1976) as follows: "To examine the structuration of a social system is to examine the modes whereby that system, through the application of generative rules and resources is produced and reproduced in social interaction."

This process of structures producing and re-producing systems is called structuration. Systems here mean to Giddens "the situated activities of human agents" (The Constitution of Society) and "the patterning of social relations across space-time" (ibid.). Structures are then "sets of rules and resources that individual actors draw upon in the practices that reproduce social systems" (Politics, Sociology and Social Theory) and "systems of generative rules and sets, implicated in the articulation of social systems" (The Constitution of Society), existing virtually "out of time and out of space" (New Rules). Structuration therefore means that relations that took shape in the structure can exist out of time and place. In other words, independent of the context in which they are created. An example is the relationship between a teacher and a student. When they come across each other in another context, say on the street, the hierarchy between them is still preserved.

Structure can act as a constraint on action, but it also enables action by providing common frames of meaning. Consider the example of language: structure of language is represented by the rules of syntax that rule out certain combinations of words. However, the structure also provides rules that allow new actions to occur, enabling us to create new, meaningful sentences. Structures should not be conceived as "simply placing constrains upon human agency, but as enabling" (New Rules). Giddens suggests that structures (traditions, institutions, moral codes and other sets of expectations—established ways of doing things) are generally quite stable, but they can be changed, especially through the unintended consequences of action when people start to ignore them, replace them, or reproduce them differently.

Actors or agents employ the social rules appropriate to their culture, ones that they have learned through socialisation and experience. These rules together with the resources at their disposal are used in social interactions. Rules and resources employed in this manner are not deterministic, but they are applied reflexively by knowledgeable actors, albeit that actors' awareness may be limited to the specifics of their activities at any given time. Thus, the outcome of action is not totally predictable.

=== Connections between micro and macro ===
Structuration is very useful in synthesising micro and macro issues. On a micro scale, one of individuals' internal sense of self and identity, consider the example of a family in which we are increasingly free to choose our own mates and how to relate with them which creates new opportunities yet also more work as the relationship becomes a reflexive project that has to be interpreted and maintained. At the same time, this micro-level change cannot be explained only by looking at the individual level as people did not spontaneously change their minds about how to live and neither can we assume they were directed to do so by social institutions and the state.

On a macro scale, one of the state and social organisations like multinational capitalist corporations, consider the example of globalisation which offers vast new opportunities for investment and development, but crises—like the 1997 Asian financial crisis—can affect the entire world, spreading far outside the local setting in which they first developed and last but not least directly influences individuals. A serious explanation of such issues must lie somewhere within the network of macro and micro forces. These levels should not be treated as unconnected and in fact they have significant relation to one another.

To illustrate this relationship, Giddens discusses changing attitudes towards marriage in developed countries. He claims that any effort to explain this phenomenon solely in terms of macro or micro level causes would result in a circular cause and consequence. Social relationships and visible sexuality (micro-level change) are related to the decline of religion and the rise of rationality (macro-level change), but with changes in the laws relating to marriage and sexuality (macro) as well, change caused by different practices and changing attitudes on the level of everyday lives (micro). Practices and attitudes in turn can be affected by social movements (for example, women's liberation and egalitarianism), a macro-scale phenomena. However, the movements usually grow out of everyday life grievances—a micro-scale phenomenon.

All of this is increasingly tied in with mass media, one of our main providers of information. The media do not merely reflect the social world yet also actively shape it, being central to modern reflexivity. In Media, Gender and Identity, David Gauntlett writes:

The importance of the media in propagating many modern lifestyles should be obvious. ... The range of lifestyles—or lifestyle ideals—offered by the media may be limited, but at the same time it is usually broader than those we would expect to just 'bump into' in everyday life. So the media in modernity offers possibilities and celebrates diversity, but also offers narrow interpretations of certain roles or lifestyles—depending where you look.

Another example explored by Giddens is the emergence of romantic love which Giddens (The Transformation of Intimacy) links with the rise of the narrative of the self type of self-identity, stating: "Romantic love introduced the idea of a narrative into an individual's life". Although the history of sex clearly demonstrates that passion and sex are not modern phenomena, the discourse of romantic love is said to have developed from the late 18th century. Romanticism, the 18th- and 19th-century European macro-level cultural movement, is responsible for the emergence of the novel—a relatively early form of mass media. The growing literacy and popularity of novels fed back into the mainstream lifestyle and the romance novel proliferated the stories of ideal romantic life narratives on a micro-level, giving the romantic love an important and recognised role in the marriage-type relationship.

Consider also the transformation of intimacy. Giddens asserts that intimate social relationships have become democratised so that the bond between partners—even within a marriage—has little to do with external laws, regulations or social expectations, but instead it is based on the internal understanding between two people—a trusting bond based on emotional communication. Where such a bond ceases to exist, modern society is generally happy for the relationship to be dissolved. Thus, we have "a democracy of the emotions in everyday life" (Runaway World, 1999).

A democracy of the emotions—the democratising of everyday life—is an ideal, more or less approximated to in the diverse contexts of everyday life. There are many societies, cultures and contexts in which it remains far from reality—where sexual oppression is an everyday phenomenon. In The Transformation of Intimacy, Giddens introduces the notion of plastic sexuality—sexuality freed from an intrinsic connection with reproduction and hence open to innovation and experimentation. What was once open only to elites becomes generalised with the advent of mass contraception as sexuality and identity become far more fluid than in the past. These changes are part and parcel of wider transformations affecting the self and self-identity.

Inevitably, Giddens concludes that all social change stems from a mixture of micro- and macro-level forces.

=== Self-identity ===
Giddens says that in the post-traditional order self-identity is reflexive. It is not a quality of a moment, but instead an account of a person's life. Giddens writes:

A person's identity is not to be found in behaviour, nor—important though this is—in the reactions of others, but in the capacity to keep a particular narrative going. The individual's biography, if she is to maintain regular interaction with others in the day-to-day world, cannot be wholly fictive. It must continually integrate events which occur in the external world, and sort them into the ongoing 'story' about the self.

More than ever before, we have access to information that allows us to reflect on the causes and consequences of our actions. At the same time, we are faced with dangers related to unintended consequences of our actions and by our reliance on the knowledge of experts. We create, maintain and revise a set of biographical narratives, social roles and lifestyles—the story of who we are and how we came to be where we are now. We are increasingly free to choose what we want to do and who we want to be, although Giddens contends that wealth gives access to more options. However, increased choice can be both liberating and troubling. Liberating in the sense of increasing the likelihood of one's self-fulfilment and troubling in form of increased emotional stress and time needed to analyse the available choices and minimise risk of which we are increasingly aware, or what Giddens sums up as the manufacturing uncertainty. While in earlier, traditional societies we would be provided with that narrative and social role, in the post-traditional society we are usually forced to create one ourselves. As Giddens puts it: "What to do? How to act? Who to be? These are focal questions for everyone living in circumstances of late modernity—and ones which, on some level or another, all of us answer, either discursively or through day-to-day social behaviour."

=== Modernity ===
Giddens' recent work has been concerned with the question of what is characteristic about social institutions in various points of history. Giddens agrees that there are very specific changes that mark our current era. However, he argues that it is not a post-modern era, but instead it is just a "radicalised modernity era" (similar to Zygmunt Bauman's concept of liquid modernity), produced by the extension of the same social forces that shaped the previous age. Nonetheless, Giddens differentiates between pre-modern, modern and late or high modern societies and does not dispute that important changes have occurred but takes a neutral stance towards those changes, saying that it offers both unprecedented opportunities and unparalleled dangers. He also stresses that we have not really gone beyond modernity as it is just a developed, detraditionalised, radicalised late modernity. Thus, the phenomena that some have called postmodern are to Giddens nothing more than the most extreme instances of a developed modernity. Along with Ulrich Beck and Scott Lash, he endorses the term reflexive modernisation as a more accurate description of the processes associated with the second modernity since it opposes itself in its earlier version instead of opposing traditionalism, endangering the very institutions it created such as the national state, the political parties or the nuclear family.

Giddens concentrates on a contrast between traditional (pre-modern) culture and post-traditional (modern) culture. In traditional societies, individual actions need not be extensively thought about because available choices are already determined (by the customs, traditions and so on). In contrast, in post-traditional society people (actors or agents) are much less concerned with the precedents set by earlier generations and they have more choices, due to flexibility of law and public opinion. However, this means that individual actions now require more analysis and thought before they are taken. Society is more reflexive and aware, something Giddens is fascinated with, illustrating it with examples ranging from state governance to intimate relationships. Giddens examines three realms in particular, namely the experience of identity, connections of intimacy and political institutions.

According to Giddens, the most defining property of modernity is that we are disembedded from time and space. In pre-modern societies, space was the area in which one moved and time was the experience one had while moving. In modern societies, the social space is no longer confined by the boundaries set by the space in which one moves. One can now imagine what other spaces look like even if he has never been there. In this regard, Giddens talks about virtual space and virtual time. Another distinctive property of modernity lies in the field of knowledge.

In pre-modern societies, it was the elders who possessed the knowledge as they were definable in time and space. In modern societies, we must rely on expert systems. These are not present in time and space, but we must trust them. Even if we trust them, we know that something could go wrong as there is always a risk we have to take. Even the technologies which we use and which transform constraints into means hold risks. Consequently, there is always a heightened sense of uncertainty in contemporary societies. It is also in this regard that Giddens uses the image of a juggernaut as modernity is said to be like an unsteerable juggernaut travelling through space.

Humanity tries to steer it, but as long as the modern institutions with all their uncertainty endure, then we will never be able to influence its course. The uncertainty can be managed by reembedding the expert-systems into the structures which we are accustomed to.

Another characteristic is enhanced reflexivity, both at the level of individuals and at the level of institutions. The latter requires an explanation as in modern institutions there is always a component which studies the institutions themselves for the purpose of enhancing its effectiveness. This enhanced reflexivity was enabled as language became increasingly abstract with the transition from pre-modern to modern societies, becoming institutionalised into universities. It is also in this regard that Giddens talks about double hermeneutica as every action has two interpretations. One is from the actor himself, the other of the investigator who tries to give meaning to the action he is observing. However, the actor who performs the action can get to know the interpretation of the investigator and therefore change his own interpretation, or his further line of action.

According to Giddens, this is the reason that positive science is never possible in the social sciences as every time an investigator tries to identify causal sequences of action, the actors can change their further line of action. However, the problem is that conflicting viewpoints in social science result in a disinterest of the people. For example, when scientists do not agree about the greenhouse effect, people would withdraw from that arena and deny that there is a problem. Therefore, the more the sciences expand, the more uncertainty there is in the modern society. In this regard, the juggernaut gets even more steerless as Giddens states:

While emancipatory politics is a politics of life chances, life politics is a politics of lifestyle. Life politics is the politics of a reflexively mobilised order—the system of late modernity—which, on an individual and collective level, has radically altered the existential parameters of social activity. It is a politics of self-actualisation in a reflexively ordered environment, where that reflexivity links self and body to systems of global scope. ... Life politics concerns political issues which flow from processes of self-actualisation in post-traditional contexts, where globalising influences intrude deeply into the reflexive project of the self, and conversely where processes of self-realisation influence global strategies.

In A Contemporary Critique of Historical Materialism, Giddens concludes:

1. There exists no necessary overall mechanism of social change, no universal motor of history such as class conflict.
2. There are no universal stages, or periodisation, of social development, these being ruled out by intersocietal systems and "time-space edges" (the ever-presence of exogenous variables) as well as by human agency and the inherent historicity of societies.
3. Societies do not have needs other than those of individuals, therefore notions such as adaptation cannot properly be applied to them.
4. Pre-capitalist societies are class-divided, but only with capitalism there are class societies in which there is endemic class conflict, the separation of the political and economic spheres, property freely alienable as capital and "free" labour and labour markets.
5. While class conflict is integral to capitalist society, there is no teleology that guarantees the emergence of the working class as the universal class and no ontology that justifies denial of the multiple bases of modern society represented by capitalism, industrialism, bureaucratisation, surveillance and industrialisation of warfare.
6. Sociology, as a subject pre-eminently with modernity, addresses a reflexive reality.

=== Third Way ===
In the age of late and reflexive modernity and post-scarcity economy, the political science is being transformed. Giddens notes that there is a possibility that "life politics" (the politics of self-actualisation) may become more visible than "emancipatory politics" (the politics of inequality); that new social movements may lead to more social change than political parties; and that the reflexive project of the self and changes in gender and sexual relations may lead the way via the "democratisation of democracy" to a new era of Habermasian "dialogic democracy" in which differences are settled and practices ordered through discourse rather than violence or the commands of authority.

Relying on his past familiar themes of reflexivity and system integration which places people into new relations of trust and dependency with each other and their governments, Giddens argues that the political concepts of left and right are now breaking down as a result of many factors, most centrally the absence of a clear alternative to capitalism and the eclipse of political opportunities based on the social class in favour of those based on lifestyle choices.

Giddens moves away from explaining how things are to the more demanding attempt of advocacy about how they ought to be. In Beyond Left and Right (1994), Giddens criticises market socialism and constructs a six-point framework for a reconstituted radical politics:

1. Repair damaged solidarities.
2. Recognise the centrality of life politics.
3. Accept that active trust implies generative politics.
4. Embrace dialogic democracy.
5. Rethink the welfare state.
6. Confront violence.

The Third Way: The Renewal of Social Democracy (1998) provides the framework within which the Third Way, also termed by Giddens as the radical centre, is justified. In addition, The Third Way supplies a broad range of policy proposals aimed at what Giddens calls the "progressive centre-left" in British politics. According to Giddens: "[T]he overall aim of third way politics should be to help citizens pilot their way through the major revolutions of our time: globalisation, transformations in personal life and our relationship to nature." Giddens remains fairly optimistic about the future of humanity: "There is no single agent, group or movement that, as Marx's proletariat was supposed to do, can carry the hopes of humanity, but there are many points of political engagement which offer good cause for optimism."

Giddens discards the possibility of a single, comprehensive, all-connecting ideology or political programme without a duality of structure. Instead, he advocates going after the small pictures, ones people can directly affect at their home, workplace or local community. To Giddens, this is a difference between pointless utopianism and useful utopian realism which he defines as envisaging "alternative futures whose very propagation might help them be realised" (The Consequences of Modernity). By utopian, he means that this is something new and extraordinary, and by realistic he stresses that this idea is rooted in the existing social processes and can be viewed as their simple extrapolation. Such a future has at its centre a more socialised, demilitarised and planetary-caring global world order variously articulated within green, women's and peace movements and within the wider democratic movement.

The Third Way was not just a work of abstract theory as it influenced a range of centre-left political parties across the world—in Europe, Latin America and Australasia. Although close to New Labour in the United Kingdom, Giddens dissociated himself from many of the interpretations of the Third Way made in the sphere of day-to-day politics. For him, it was not a succumbing to neoliberalism or the dominance of capitalist markets. The point was to get beyond both market fundamentalism and traditional top-down socialism to make the values of the centre-left count in a globalising world. He argued that "the regulation of financial markets is the single most pressing issue in the world economy" and that "global commitment to free trade depends upon effective regulation rather than dispenses with the need for it".

In 1999, Giddens delivered the BBC Reith Lectures on the subject of runaway world, subsequently published as a book of that title. The aim was to introduce the concept and implications of globalisation to a lay audience. He was the first Reith Lecturer to deliver the lectures in different places around the world and the first to respond directly to e-mails that came in while he was speaking. The lectures were delivered in London, Washington, New Delhi and Hong Kong and responded to by local audiences. Giddens received the Asturias Prize for the social sciences in 2002. The award has been labelled the Spanish Nobel Prize, but it stretches well beyond the sphere of science. Other recipients of the prize that year included Woody Allen, the inventor of the World Wide Web Tim Berners-Lee and conductor Daniel Barenboim.

== Outside consultancies ==
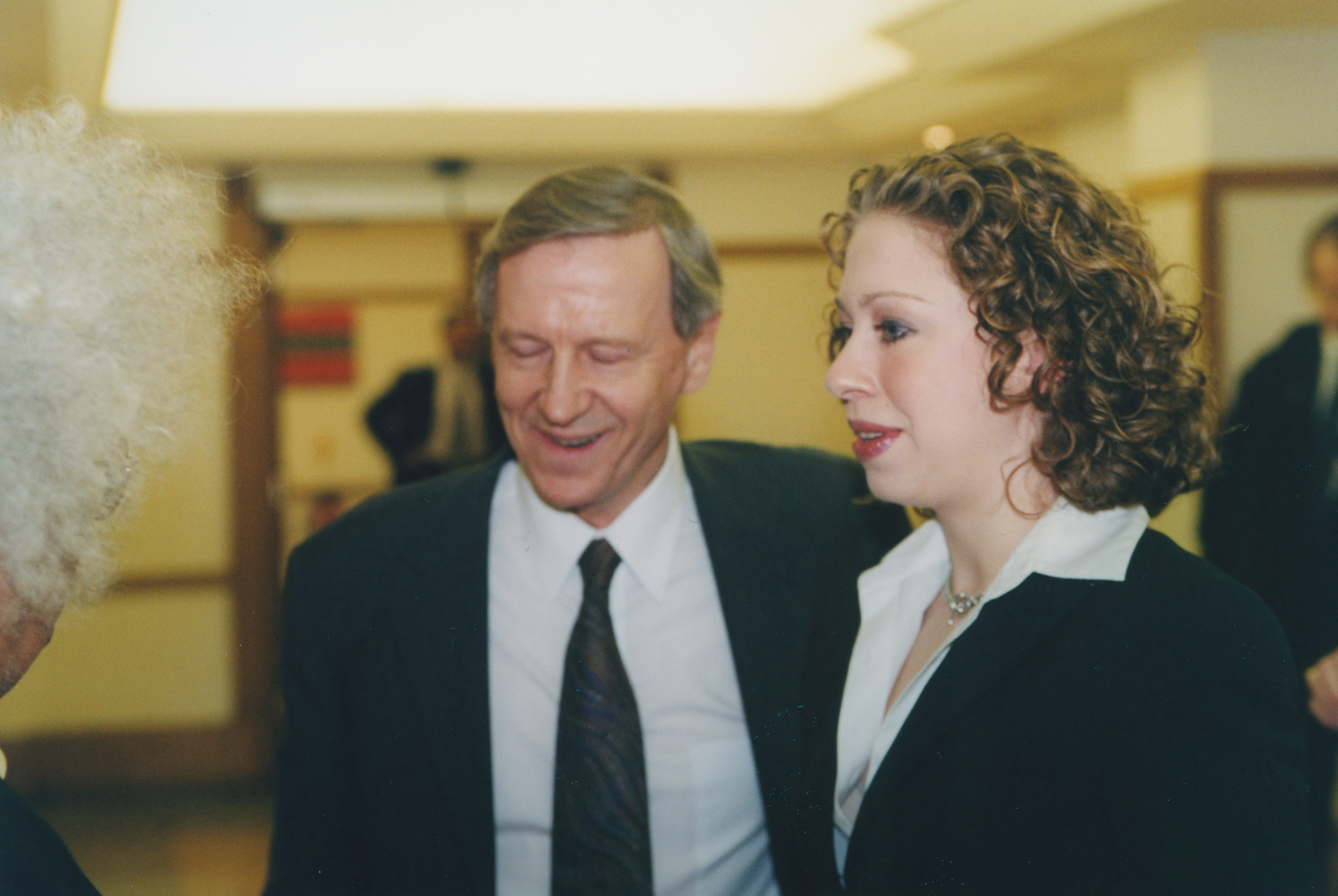
Giddens and Chelsea Clinton at the London School of Economics in 2001

On two visits to Libya in 2006 and 2007, organised by the Boston-based consultancy firm Monitor Group, Giddens met with Muammar Gaddafi. Giddens has declined to comment on the financial compensation he received. The Guardian reported in March 2011 that Libya's government engaged Monitor Group as advisor on matters of public relations. Monitor Group allegedly received 2 million pounds in return for undertaking a "cleansing campaign" to improve Libya's image. In a letter to Abdullah Senussi, a high-ranking Libyan official in July 2006, Monitor Group reported as follows:

We will create a network map to identify significant figures engaged or interested in Libya today. ... We will identify and encourage journalists, academics and contemporary thinkers who will have interest in publishing papers and articles on Libya. ... We are delighted that after a number of conversations, Lord Giddens has now accepted our invitation to visit Libya in July.

Giddens' first visit to Libya resulted in articles in the New Statesman, El País and La Repubblica, where he argued that the country had been dramatically transformed. In the New Statesman, he wrote: "Gaddafi's 'conversion' may have been driven partly by the wish to escape sanctions, but I get the strong sense it is authentic and there is a lot of motive power behind it. Saif Gaddafi is a driving force behind the rehabilitation and potential modernisation of Libya. Gaddafi Sr, however, is authorising these processes". During the second visit, Monitor Group organised a panel of three thinkers (Giddens, Gaddafi, and Benjamin Barber, author of Jihad vs. McWorld) chaired by Sir David Frost.

Giddens remarked of his meetings with Gaddafi as such: "You usually get about half an hour with a political leader". He also recalls the following: "My conversation lasts for more than three. Gaddafi is relaxed and clearly enjoys intellectual conversation. He likes the term 'third way' because his own political philosophy is a version of this idea. He makes many intelligent and perceptive points. I leave enlivened and encouraged".

== Theory of reflexivity ==
Giddens introduces reflexivity and in information societies information gathering is considered as a routinised process for the greater protection of the nation. Information gathering is known as the concept of individuation. Individuality comes as a result of individuation as people are given more informed choices. The more information the government has about a person, the more entitlements are given to the citizens. The process of information gathering helps government to identify enemies of the state, singling out individuals that are suspected of plotting activities against the state. The advent of technology has brought national security to a completely new level. Historically, the military relied on armed force to deal with threats. With the development of ICT, biometric scans, language translation, real time programs and other related intelligent programs have made the identification of terrorist activities much easier compared to the past. The analysing of algorithm patterns in biometric databases have given government new leads. Data about citizens can be collected through identification and credential verification companies. Hence, surveillance and ICT goes hand-in-hand with information gathering. In other words, the collection of information is necessary as stringent safeguards for the protection of the nation, preventing it from imminent attacks.

=== Living in a high opportunity, high risk society ===
Giddens has vigorously pursued the theme of globalisation in recent years. He sees the growing interdependence of world society as driven not only by the increasing integration of the world economy, but above all by massive advances in communications. As he has noted when he delivered the BBC Reith Lectures just before the turn of the century, the Internet was in its infancy. However, now it has expanded in a wholly unprecedented way, linking people and organisations across the world on an everyday level as well as intruding deeply into everyday life. Billions of people have access to it and the numbers are growing every day. An increasingly interconnected and wired-up world offers many advantages and benefits, yet it carries new risks too, some themselves of global proportions. In the 21st century, work opportunity and risk combine as never before. Giddens refers to the emergence on a global level of a "high opportunity, high risk society". Both on the level of opportunity and risk we are in terrain human beings have never explored before. We do not know in advance what the balance is likely to be because many of the opportunities and risks are quite new as we cannot draw on past history to assess them.

Climate change is one of those new risks. No other civilisation before the advent of modern industrialism was able to intervene into nature to even a fraction of the extent to which we do on an everyday basis.

Climate change was referred to in several of Giddens's books from the mid-1990s onwards, but it was not discussed at length until the publication of his work The Politics of Climate Change in 2009. Giddens says climate change constitutes a fundamental threat to the future of industrial civilisation as it spreads across the globe. Given that is the case, he asks why are countries around the world doing so little to counter its advance. Many reasons are involved, but the prime one is the historical novelty of humanly induced climate change itself. No previous civilisation intervened into nature on a level remotely similar to that which we do on an everyday level today. We have no previous experience of dealing with such an issue and especially one of such global scope, or of the dangers it poses. Those dangers hence appear as abstract and located at some indefinite point in the future. Giddens's paradox consists of the following theorem. We are likely put off responding adequately to climate change until major catastrophes unequivocally connected to it occur, but by then by definition it would be too late, for we have no way of reversing the build-up of greenhouses gases that is driving the transformation of the world's climate. Some such gases would be in the atmosphere for centuries.

Within 'The Politics of Climate Change' Giddens places attention on global environmental conferences such as the 1997 Kyoto summit, whereby an agreement was drawn up so that developed countries would cut their emissions by an average of 5.2 per cent. The Kyoto protocol was to become a part of international law, and the developed countries who accounted for at least 55 per cent of total emissions from the industrial states, would have to sign up.

In his latest work, Giddens has returned to the subject of the European Union, discussed in 2007 in his book Europe in the Global Age and in a diversity of articles. In Turbulent and Mighty Continent: What Future for Europe?, he discusses the likely future of the European Union after the 2008 financial crisis. Giddens writes as a committed pro-European, but he accepts that fundamental reforms must be made if the European Union is to avoid stagnation or worse. The coming of the euro introduced economic federalism among the eurozone countries and therefore to the European Union as a whole. Some version of political federalism must follow, even if limited in nature. Reforms must confer qualities absent from much of the European Union's history, but which are now required for its future such as flexible and quick-acting leadership, coupled to the greater democratic involvement of citizens. However, he also emphasised that European Union "could still founder, even disintegrate, the result of a chain reaction of circumstances that member states were unable to control". In December 2014, Turbulent and Mighty Continent was awarded the European Book Prize, awarded by a selection jury featuring members from many different countries.

In recent years, while continuing to pursue some of the core themes of his earlier works he has become preoccupied with the impact of the Digital Revolution on world society and on everyday life. That revolution, he argues, must not be identified solely with the advent of the internet, extraordinary although that is. Rather, the Digital Revolution is a massive wave of change washing across the world, driven by the interrelation between the Internet, robotics and supercomputers. It is huge algorithmic power—available to the billions of people who already possess smartphones—that connects the other two.

Giddens sees the pace and global scope of such revolution as unprecedented in human history and we are probably only in its early stages. Many see the Digital Revolution as primarily producing endless diversity and as acting to dissolve pre-existing institutions and modes of life. Giddens emphasises that from its beginnings it has been bound up with power and large-scale structures too. It is deeply bound up with American global power and has physical form, depending as it does upon global satellite systems and systems, underground cables and concentrations of supercomputers. GPS has its origins in super-power rivalry between the United States and what was then the Soviet Union. The digital universe is also funded by mass advertising and expresses the dominance of large corporations in the world economy.

The Digital Revolution forms an significant part of Giddens's recent preoccupation with the emergence of the high opportunity, high risk society. For example, the advent of such revolution promises fundamental advances in core areas of medicine. New threats and problems abound, both in everyday life and in the larger institutions of society. Scientists can communicate with one-another in a direct way across the world. The overlap of supercomputers and genetics means that genetic structures can be decoded instantaneously, promising huge advances in conquering major diseases. Medical practice is likely to be transformed through remote monitoring and other digital innovations. At the same time, the overlap of the Digital Revolution with criminality, violence and war is pervasive and poses a great danger. Military drones are just one example of the continuing involvement of the Digital Revolution with war.

Emerging developments in artificial intelligence are contributing to a new phase of technological and social change, although the longer-term implications remain uncertain. Supercomputers are becoming increasingly powerful in their capacity to process large amounts of data, while quantum computers are being developed with the potential for greater processing capabilities inc certain applications. At the same time, deep learning—based on artificial neural networks, continues to advance. A worldwide debate is taking place over the extent to which artificial intelligence may match or surpass human intellectual capabilities. Artificial intelligence and geopolitics, Giddens says, are converging once again "as the circle of change comes back to its point of origin". In the meantime, China is investing significant resources in the further development of artificial intelligence and has developed some of the world's most advanced supercomputer.

Giddens was a member of the House of Lords Select Committee on artificial intelligence which reported in April 2018. The committee put forward a variety of suggested reforms to apply not only in the United Kingdom, but potentially much more widely as well. These should take place within a common ethical framework to guide intervention on the part of government and of the digital corporations themselves. The power of the digital mega-corporations must be curtailed and subjected to democratic governance, challenging and problematic though such an endeavour is. Artificial intelligence should be developed for the common good. It should follow principles of transparency and fairness and never be allocated the autonomous capability to harm human actors. The major nations and transnational agencies should work towards ensuring that such principles are incorporated into their own codes and practices and applied on a transnational level. The worry is that an artificial intelligence arms race would develop as countries jostle to take the lead both in artificial intelligence generally and in its application to weaponry of diverse sorts. In a much-publicised speech given in 2017, Russian President Vladimir Putin observed of advances in artificial intelligence that "whoever becomes the leader in this sphere will become the ruler of the world". If there is a jostling for advantage among the major powers, concerns of ethics and safety may fall by the wayside in the scramble for advantage, adding to the stresses and strains already visible in the international order.

== Honours ==
Giddens was appointed to a life peerage on 16 June 2004 as Baron Giddens, of Southgate in the London Borough of Enfield and sits in the House of Lords for the Labour Party.

He was elected a member of the Academia Europaea in 1993. He is also a fellow of the American Academy of Arts and Sciences and the Chinese Academy of Social Sciences.

In 1999, he was made a Grand Cross of the Order of Prince Henry the Navigator by the Portuguese government.

Giddens received the Prince of Asturias Award for Social Sciences in 2002.

In June 2020 it was announced that Giddens had been awarded the Arne Naess Chair and Prize at the University of Oslo, Norway, in recognition of his contributions to the study of environmental issues and climate change. Previous holders of the chair include James Lovelock, David Sloan Wilson and Eva Joly.

He also holds over 15 honorary degrees from various universities, including recently honorary degrees from Jagiellonian University (2015), the University of South Australia (2016), Goldsmiths, University of London (2016) and Lingnan University (2017).

== Select bibliography ==
Giddens is the author of over 34 books and 200 articles. This is a selection of some of the most important of his works:

- Giddens, Anthony (1971) Capitalism and Modern Social Theory: An Analysis of the writings of Marx, Durkheim and Max Weber. Cambridge: Cambridge University Press.
- Giddens, Anthony (1973) The Class Structure of the Advanced Societies. London: Hutchinson.
- Giddens, Anthony (1976) Functionalism: apres la lutte, Social Research, 43, 325–366.
- Giddens, Anthony (1976) New Rules of Sociological Method: a Positive Critique of interpretative Sociologies. London: Hutchinson.
- Giddens, Anthony (1977) Studies in Social and Political Theory. London: Hutchinson.
- Giddens, Anthony (1978) Durkheim. London: Fontana Modern Masters.
- Giddens, Anthony (1979) Central problems in Social Theory: Action, Structure and Contradiction in Social Analysis. London: Macmillan.
- Giddens, Anthony (1981) A Contemporary Critique of Historical Materialism. Vol. 1. Power, Property and the State. London: Macmillan.
- Giddens, Anthony (1982) Sociology: A Brief but Critical Introduction. London: Macmillan.
- Giddens, Anthony (1982) Profiles and Critiques in Social Theory. London: Macmillan.
- Giddens, Anthony; Mackenzie, Gavin (eds.) (1982) Social Class and the Division of Labour: Essays in Honour of Ilya Neustadt. Cambridge: Cambridge University Press.
- Giddens, Anthony (1984) The Constitution of Society. Outline of the Theory of Structuration. Cambridge: Polity.
- Giddens, Anthony (1985) A Contemporary Critique of Historical Materialism. Vol. 2. The Nation-State and Violence. Cambridge: Polity.
- Giddens, Anthony (1990) The Consequences of Modernity. Cambridge: Polity.
- Giddens, Anthony (1991) Modernity and Self-Identity: Self and Society in the Late Modern Age. Cambridge: Polity.
- Giddens, Anthony (1992) The Transformation of Intimacy: Sexuality, Love and Eroticism in Modern Societies. Cambridge: Polity.
- Beck, Ulrich; Giddens, Anthony; Lash, Scott (1994) Reflexive Modernization: Politics, Tradition and Aesthetics in the Modern Social Order. Cambridge: Polity.
- Giddens, Anthony (1994) Beyond Left and Right — the Future of Radical Politics. Cambridge: Polity.
- Giddens, Anthony (1995) Politics, Sociology and Social Theory: Encounters with Classical and Contemporary Social Thought. Cambridge: Polity.
- Giddens, Anthony (1996) In Defence of Sociology. Cambridge: Polity.
- Giddens, Anthony (1996) Durkheim on Politics and the State. Cambridge: Polity.
- Giddens, Anthony (1998) The Third Way. The Renewal of Social Democracy. Cambridge: Polity.
- Giddens, Anthony (1999) Runaway World: How Globalization is Reshaping Our Lives. London: Profile.
- Hutton, Will; Giddens, Anthony (eds.) (2000) On The Edge: Living with Global Capitalism. London: Vintage.
- Giddens, Anthony (2000) The Third Way and Its Critics. Cambridge: Polity.
- Giddens, Anthony (2000) Runaway World. London: Routledge.
- Giddens, Anthony (ed.) (2001) The Global Third Way Debate. Cambridge: Polity.
- Giddens, Anthony (2002) Where Now for New Labour? Cambridge: Polity (publisher).
- Giddens, Anthony (ed.) (2003) The Progressive Manifesto. New Ideas for the Centre-Left. Cambridge: Polity.
- Giddens, Anthony (ed.) (2005) The New Egalitarianism Cambridge: Polity.
- Giddens, Anthony; Sutton, Philip W. (2021) Sociology (9th Edition). Cambridge: Polity.
- Giddens, Anthony (2007) Europe In The Global Age. Cambridge: Polity
- Giddens, Anthony (2007) Over to You, Mr Brown - How Labour Can Win Again. Cambridge: Polity.
- Giddens, Anthony (2009) The Politics of Climate Change. Cambridge: Polity
- Giddens, Anthony; Duneier, Mitchell; Appelbaum, Richard P.; Carr, Deborah (2009) Introduction to Sociology (Seventh Edition). Cambridge: Polity.
- Giddens, Anthony; Duneier, Mitchell; Appelbaum, Richard P.; Carr, Deborah (2011) Introduction to Sociology (Eighth Edition). New York: W. W. Norton & Company.
- Giddens, Anthony; Duneier, Mitchell; Appelbaum, Richard P.; Carr, Deborah (2013) Introduction to Sociology (Ninth Edition). New York: W. W. Norton & Company.
- Giddens, Anthony; Duneier, Mitchell; Appelbaum, Richard P.; Carr, Deborah (2016) Introduction to Sociology (Tenth Edition). New York: W. W. Norton & Company.
- Giddens, Anthony; Duneier, Mitchell; Appelbaum, Richard P.; Carr, Deborah (2018) Introduction to Sociology (Eleventh Edition). New York: W. W. Norton & Company.
- Giddens, Anthony; Duneier, Mitchell; Appelbaum, Richard P.; Carr, Deborah (2021) Introduction to Sociology (Twelfth Edition). New York: W. W. Norton & Company.

== See also ==
- Modalities (sociology)
- Risk society

Academic offices
Preceded by John Ashworth	Director of the London School of Economics; 1997–2003	Succeeded by Howard Davies
Other offices
Preceded by John Keegan	Reith Lecturer; 1999	Succeeded by Gro Harlem Brundtland
Preceded by John Keegan	Reith Lecturer; 1999	Succeeded by The Prince of Wales
Preceded by John Keegan	Reith Lecturer; 1999	Succeeded by Sir John Browne
Preceded by John Keegan	Reith Lecturer; 1999	Succeeded by Thomas Lovejoy
Preceded by John Keegan	Reith Lecturer; 1999	Succeeded by Chris Patten
Preceded by John Keegan	Reith Lecturer; 1999	Succeeded by Vandana Shiva
Awards
Preceded by El Colegio de México	Prince of Asturias Award for Social Sciences; 2002	Succeeded by Jürgen Habermas
Preceded by Juan Iglesias Santos	Prince of Asturias Award for Social Sciences; 2002	Succeeded by Jürgen Habermas
Preceded by Arnaud Leparmentier	European Book Prize for Non-fiction; 2014	Succeeded by Robert Menasse
Orders of precedence in the United Kingdom
Preceded by The Lord Roberts of Llandudno	Gentlemen; Baron Giddens	Followed by The Lord Rana
