= Modalities (sociology) =

Key concept in structuration theory

Modalities are fundamental to understanding the concept behind structuration. According to Anthony Giddens, modalities explain the properties of the structure. The structure is said to have both structural and individual qualities. Giddens refers to these structural modalities as "rules" and "resources" respectively. In application, Giddens is separating himself from other structuralists by acknowledging the enabling functions that the structure provides.

A case of a "rule" is the act of obeying a law. That is, there are limits that the structure places on agency causing the agent to act in a certain way. In this respect the structure is imposing restrictions upon the agent in order to accomplish societal norms. Norms, however, have changed in the past and are under constant manipulation by the society through the use of structural "resources". Civil laws can and have been overturned or rewritten in the past. Laws that have limited human liberties, can be overturned as there exists "resources", e.g. lawyers who can present a case for social reform. It could also be the process of judicial review itself.

Giddens suggests that it is these modalities that illustrate his reliance on the duality of structure because it presents a case where knowledgeable individuals can use the resources available to them to change policies, standards or norms that the structure imposes upon them.

== See also ==
- Duality of structure
