= Structuration theory =

Social theory proposed by Giddens that attempts to resolve the structure-agent debate

The theory of structuration is a social theory of the creation and reproduction of social systems that is based on the analysis of both structure and agents (see structure and agency), without giving primacy to either. Furthermore, in structuration theory, neither micro- nor macro-focused analysis alone is sufficient. The theory was proposed by sociologist Georges Gurvitch and later refined by Anthony Giddens, most significantly in The Constitution of Society, which examines phenomenology, hermeneutics, and social practices at the inseparable intersection of structures and agents. Its proponents have adopted and expanded this balanced position. Though the theory has received much criticism, it remains a pillar of contemporary sociological theory.

== Premises and origins ==
Sociologist Anthony Giddens adopted a post-empiricist frame for his theory, as he was concerned with the abstract characteristics of social relations. This leaves each level more accessible to analysis via the ontologies which constitute the human social experience: space and time ("and thus, in one sense, 'history'"). His aim was to build a broad social theory which viewed "[t]he basic domain of study of the social sciences... [as] neither the experience of the individual actor, nor the existence of any form of societal totality, but social practices ordered across space and time." His focus on abstract ontology accompanied a general and purposeful neglect of epistemology or detailed research methodology, consistent with other types of pragmatism.

Giddens used concepts from objectivist and subjectivist social theories, discarding objectivism's focus on detached structures, which lacked regard for humanist elements and subjectivism's exclusive attention to individual or group agency without consideration for socio-structural context. He critically engaged classical nineteenth and early twentieth century social theorists such as Auguste Comte, Karl Marx, Max Weber, Émile Durkheim, Alfred Schutz, Robert K. Merton, Erving Goffman, and Jürgen Habermas. Thus, in many ways, structuration was "an exercise in clarification of logical issues." Structuration drew on other fields, as well: "He also wanted to bring in from other disciplines novel aspects of ontology that he felt had been neglected by social theorists working in the domains that most interested him. Thus, for example, he enlisted the aid of geographers, historians and philosophers in bringing notions of time and space into the central heartlands of social theory." Giddens hoped that a subject-wide "coming together" might occur which would involve greater cross-disciplinary dialogue and cooperation, especially between anthropologists, social scientists and sociologists of all types, historians, geographers, and even novelists. Believing that "literary style matters", he held that social scientists are communicators who share frames of meaning across cultural contexts through their work by utilising "the same sources of description (mutual knowledge) as novelists or others who write fictional accounts of social life."

Structuration differs from its historical sources. Unlike structuralism it sees the reproduction of social systems not "as a mechanical outcome, [but] rather ... as an active constituting process, accomplished by, and consisting in, the doings of active subjects." Unlike Althusser's concept of agents as "bearers" of structures, structuration theory sees them as active participants. Unlike the philosophy of action and other forms of interpretative sociology, structuration focuses on structure rather than production exclusively. Unlike Saussure's production of an utterance, structuration sees language as a tool from which to view society, not as the constitution of society—parting with structural linguists such as Claude Lévi-Strauss and generative grammar theorists such as Noam Chomsky. Unlike post-structuralist theory, which put similar focus on the effects of time and space, structuration does not recognise only movement, change and transition. Unlike functionalism, in which structures and their virtual synonyms, "systems", comprise organisations, structuration sees structures and systems as separate concepts. Unlike Marxism, structuration avoids an overly restrictive concept of "society" and Marxism's reliance on a universal "motor of history" (i.e. class conflict), its theories of societal "adaptation", and its insistence on the working class as universal class and socialism as the ultimate form of modern society. Finally, "structuration theory cannot be expected to furnish the moral guarantees that critical theorists sometimes purport to offer."

== Main ideas ==
=== Duality of structure ===
Giddens observed that in social analysis, the term structure referred generally to "rules and resources" and more specifically to "the structuring properties allowing the 'binding' of time-space in social systems". These properties make it possible for similar social practices to exist across time and space and that lend them "systemic" form. Agents—groups or individuals—draw upon these structures to perform social actions through embedded memory, called memory traces. Memory traces are thus the vehicle through which social actions are carried out. Structure is also, however, the result of these social practices. Thus, Giddens conceives of the duality of structure as being:

...the essential recursiveness of social life, as constituted in social practices: structure is both medium and outcome of reproduction of practices. Structure enters simultaneously into the constitution of the agent and social practices, and 'exists' in the generating moments of this constitution.

Giddens uses "the duality of structure" (i.e. material/ideational, micro/macro) to emphasize structure's nature as both medium and outcome. Structures exist both internally within agents as memory traces that are the product of phenomenological and hermeneutic inheritance and externally as the manifestation of social actions. Similarly, social structures contain agents and/or are the product of past actions of agents. Giddens holds this duality, alongside "structure" and "system," in addition to the concept of recursiveness, as the core of structuration theory. His theory has been adopted by those with structuralist inclinations, but who wish to situate such structures in human practice rather than to reify them as an ideal type or material property. (This is different, for example, from actor–network theory which appears to grant a certain autonomy to technical artifacts.)

Social systems have patterns of social relation that change over time; the changing nature of space and time determines the interaction of social relations and therefore structure. Hitherto, social structures or models were either taken to be beyond the realm of human control—the positivistic approach—or posit that action creates them—the interpretivist approach. The duality of structure emphasizes that they are different sides to the same central question of how social order is created.

Gregor McLennan suggested renaming this process "the duality of structure and agency", since both aspects are involved in using and producing social actions.

=== Cycle of structuration ===
The duality of structure is essentially a feedback–feedforward process whereby agents and structures mutually enact social systems, and social systems in turn become part of that duality. Structuration thus recognizes a social cycle. In examining social systems, structuration theory examines structure, modality, and interaction. The "modality" (discussed below) of a structural system is the means by which structures are translated into actions.

==== Interaction ====
Interaction is the agent's activity within the social system, space and time. "It can be understood as the fitful yet routinized occurrence of encounters, fading away in time and space, yet constantly reconstituted within different areas of time-space." Rules can affect interaction, as originally suggested by Goffman. "Frames" are "clusters of rules which help to constitute and regulate activities, defining them as activities of a certain sort and as subject to a given range of sanctions." Frames are necessary for agents to feel "ontological security, the trust that everyday actions have some degree of predictability. Whenever individuals interact in a specific context they address—without any difficulty and in many cases without conscious acknowledgement—the question: "What is going on here?" Framing is the practice by which agents make sense of what they are doing.

==== Routinization ====
Structuration theory is centrally concerned with order as "the transcending of time and space in human social relationships". Institutionalized action and routinization are foundational in the establishment of social order and the reproduction of social systems. Routine persists in society, even during social and political revolutions, where daily life is greatly deformed, "as Bettelheim demonstrates so well, routines, including those of an obnoxious sort, are re-established." Routine interactions become institutionalized features of social systems via tradition, custom and/or habit, but this is no easy societal task and it "is a major error to suppose that these phenomena need no explanation. On the contrary, as Goffman (together with ethnomethodology) has helped to demonstrate, the routinized character of most social activity is something that has to be 'worked at' continually by those who sustain it in their day-to-day conduct." Therefore, routinized social practices do not stem from coincidence, "but the skilled accomplishments of knowledgeable agents."

Trust and tact are essential for the existence of a "basic security system, the sustaining (in praxis) of a sense of ontological security, and [thus] the routine nature of social reproduction which agents skilfully organize. The monitoring of the body, the control and use of face in 'face work'—these are fundamental to social integration in time and space."

==== Explanation ====
When I utter a sentence I draw upon various syntactical rules (sedimented in my practical consciousness of the language) in order to do so. These structural features of the language are the medium whereby I generate the utterance. But in producing a syntactically correct utterance I simultaneously contribute to the reproduction of the language as a whole. ...The relation between moment and totality for social theory... [involves] a dialectic of presence and absence which ties the most minor or trivial forms of social action to structural properties of the overall society, and to the coalescence of institutions over long stretches of historical time.

Thus, even the smallest social actions contribute to the alteration or reproduction of social systems. Social stability and order is not permanent; agents always possess a dialectic of control (discussed below) which allows them to break away from normative actions. Depending on the social factors present, agents may cause shifts in social structure.

The cycle of structuration is not a defined sequence; it is rarely a direct succession of causal events. Structures and agents are both internal and external to each other, mingling, interrupting, and continually changing each other as feedbacks and feedforwards occur. Giddens stated, "The degree of "systemness" is very variable. ...I take it to be one of the main features of structuration theory that the extension and 'closure' of societies across space and time is regarded as problematic."

The use of "patriot" in political speech reflects this mingling, borrowing from and contributing to nationalistic norms and supports structures such as a police state, from which it in turn gains impact.

=== Structure and society ===
Structures are the "rules and resources" embedded in agents' memory traces. Agents call upon their memory traces of which they are "knowledgeable" to perform social actions. "Knowledgeability" refers to "what agents know about what they do, and why they do it." Giddens divides memory traces (structures-within-knowledgeability) into three types:

- Domination (power): Giddens also uses "resources" to refer to this type. "Authoritative resources" allow agents to control persons, whereas "allocative resources" allow agents to control material objects.
- Signification (meaning): Giddens suggests that meaning is inferred through structures. Agents use existing experience to infer meaning. For example, the meaning of living with mental illness comes from contextualized experiences.
- Legitimation (norms): Giddens sometimes uses "rules" to refer to either signification or legitimation. An agent draws upon these stocks of knowledge via memory to inform him or herself about the external context, conditions, and potential results of an action.

When an agent uses these structures for social interactions, they are called modalities and present themselves in the forms of facility (domination), interpretive scheme/communication (signification) and norms/sanctions (legitimation).

Thus, he distinguishes between overall "structures-within-knowledgeability" and the more limited and task-specific "modalities" on which these agents subsequently draw when they interact.

The duality of structures means that structures enter "simultaneously into the constitution of the agent and social practices, and 'exists' in the generating moments of this constitution." "Structures exist paradigmatically, as an absent set of differences, temporally "present" only in their instantiation, in the constituting moments of social systems." Giddens draws upon structuralism and post-structuralism in theorizing that structures and their meaning are understood by their differences.

=== Agents and society ===
Giddens' agents follow previous psychoanalysis work done by Sigmund Freud and others. Agency, as Giddens calls it, is human action. To be human is to be an agent (not all agents are human). Agency is critical to both the reproduction and the transformation of society. Another way to explain this concept is by what Giddens calls the "reflexive monitoring of actions." "Reflexive monitoring" refers to agents' ability to monitor their actions and those actions' settings and contexts. Monitoring is an essential characteristic of agency. Agents subsequently "rationalize," or evaluate, the success of those efforts. All humans engage in this process, and expect the same from others. Through action, agents produce structures; through reflexive monitoring and rationalization, they transform them. To act, agents must be motivated, must be knowledgeable must be able to rationalize the action; and must reflexively monitor the action.

Agents, while bounded in structure, draw upon their knowledge of that structural context when they act. However, actions are constrained by agents' inherent capabilities and their understandings of available actions and external limitations. Practical consciousness and discursive consciousness inform these abilities. Practical consciousness is the knowledgeability that an agent brings to the tasks required by everyday life, which is so integrated as to be hardly noticed. Reflexive monitoring occurs at the level of practical consciousness. Discursive consciousness is the ability to verbally express knowledge. Alongside practical and discursive consciousness, Giddens recognizes actors as having reflexive, contextual knowledge, and that habitual, widespread use of knowledgeability makes structures become institutionalized.

Agents rationalize, and in doing so, link the agent and the agent's knowledgeability. Agents must coordinate ongoing projects, goals, and contexts while performing actions. This coordination is called reflexive monitoring and is connected to ethnomethodology's emphasis on agents' intrinsic sense of accountability.

The factors that can enable or constrain an agent, as well as how an agent uses structures, are known as capability constraints include age, cognitive/physical limits on performing multiple tasks at once and the physical impossibility of being in multiple places at once, available time and the relationship between movement in space and movement in time.

Location offers are a particular type of capability constraint. Examples include:

- Locale
- Regionalization: political or geographical zones, or rooms in a building
- Presence: Do other actors participate in the action? (see co-presence); and more specifically
- Physical presence: Are other actors physically nearby?

Agents are always able to engage in a dialectic of control, able to "intervene in the world or to refrain from such intervention, with the effect of influencing a specific process or state of affairs." In essence, agents experience inherent and contrasting amounts of autonomy and dependence; agents can always either act or not.

=== Methodology ===
Structuration theory is relevant to research, but does not prescribe a methodology and its use in research has been problematic. Giddens intended his theory to be abstract and theoretical, informing the hermeneutic aspects of research rather than guiding practice. Giddens wrote that structuration theory "establishes the internal logical coherence of concepts within a theoretical network." Giddens criticized many researchers who used structuration theory for empirical research, critiquing their "en bloc" use of the theory's abstract concepts in a burdensome way. "The works applying concepts from the logical framework of structuration theory that Giddens approved of were those that used them more selectively, 'in a spare and critical fashion.'" Giddens and followers used structuration theory more as "a sensitizing device".

Structuration theory allows researchers to focus on any structure or concept individually or in combination. In this way, structuration theory prioritizes ontology over epistemology. In his own work, Giddens focuses on production and reproduction of social practices in some context. He looked for stasis and change, agent expectations, relative degrees of routine, tradition, behavior, and creative, skillful, and strategic thought simultaneously. He examined spatial organization, intended and unintended consequences, skilled and knowledgeable agents, discursive and tacit knowledge, dialectic of control, actions with motivational content, and constraints. Structuration theorists conduct analytical research of social relations, rather than organically discovering them, since they use structuration theory to reveal specific research questions, though that technique has been criticized as cherry-picking.

Giddens preferred strategic conduct analysis, which focuses on contextually situated actions. It employs detailed accounts of agents' knowledgeability, motivation, and the dialectic of control.

== Criticisms and additions ==
Though structuration theory has received critical expansion since its origination, Giddens' concepts remained pivotal for later extension of the theory, especially the duality of structure.

=== Strong structuration ===
Rob Stones argued that many aspects of Giddens' original theory had little place in its modern manifestation. Stones focused on clarifying its scope, reconfiguring some concepts and inserting new ones, and refining methodology and research orientations. Strong structuration:

1. Places its ontology more in situ than abstractly.
2. Introduces the quadripartite cycle, which details the elements in the duality of structure. These are:
  - external structures as conditions of action;
  - internal structures within the agent;
  - active agency, "including a range of aspects involved when agents draw upon internal structures in producing practical action"; and
  - outcomes (as both structures and events).
3. Increases attention to epistemology and methodology. Ontology supports epistemology and methodology by prioritising:
  - the question-at-hand;
  - appropriate forms of methodological bracketing;
  - distinct methodological steps in research; and
  - "[t]he specific combinations of all the above in composite forms of research."
4. Discovers the "meso-level of ontology between the abstract, philosophical level of ontology and the in-situ, ontic level." Strong structuration allows varied abstract ontological concepts in experiential conditions.
5. Focuses on the meso-level at the temporal and spatial scale.
6. Conceptualises independent causal forces and irresistible causal forces, which take into account how external structures, internal structures, and active agency affect agent choices (or lack of them). "Irresistible forces" are the connected concepts of a horizon of action with a set of "actions-in-hand" and a hierarchical ordering of purposes and concerns. An agent is affected by external influences. This aspect of strong structuration helps reconcile an agent's dialectic of control and his/her more constrained set of "real choices."

=== Post-structuration and dualism ===
Margaret Archer objected to the inseparability of structure and agency in structuration theory. She proposed a notion of dualism rather than "duality of structure". She primarily examined structural frameworks and the action within the limits allowed by those conditions. She combined realist ontology and called her methodology analytical dualism. Archer maintained that structure precedes agency in social structure reproduction and analytical importance, and that they should be analysed separately. She emphasised the importance of temporality in social analysis, dividing it into four stages: structural conditioning, social interaction, its immediate outcome and structural elaboration. Thus her analysis considered embedded "structural conditions, emergent causal powers and properties, social interactions between agents, and subsequent structural changes or reproductions arising from the latter." Archer criticised structuration theory for denying time and place because of the inseparability between structure and agency.

Nicos Mouzelis reconstructed Giddens' original theories. Mouzelis kept Giddens' original formulation of structure as "rules and resources." However, he was considered a dualist, because he argued for dualism to be as important in social analysis as the duality of structure. Mouzelis reexamined human social action at the "syntagmatic" (syntactic) level. He claimed that the duality of structure does not account for all types of social relationships. Duality of structure works when agents do not question or disrupt rules, and interaction resembles "natural/performative" actions with a practical orientation. However, in other contexts, the relationship between structure and agency can resemble dualism more than duality, such as systems that are the result of powerful agents. In these situations, rules are not viewed as resources, but are in states of transition or redefinition, where actions are seen from a "strategic/monitoring orientation." In this orientation, dualism shows the distance between agents and structures. He called these situations "syntagmatic duality". For example, a professor can change the class he or she teaches, but has little capability to change the larger university structure. "In that case, syntagmatic duality gives way to syntagmatic dualism." This implies that systems are the outcome, but not the medium, of social actions. Mouzelis also criticised Giddens' lack of consideration for social hierarchies.

John Parker built on Archer and Mouzelis's support for dualism to propose a theoretical reclamation of historical sociology and macro-structures using concrete historical cases, claiming that dualism better explained the dynamics of social structures. Equally, Robert Archer developed and applied analytical dualism in his critical analysis of the impact of New Managerialism on education policy in England and Wales during the 1990s and organization theory.

=== John B. Thompson ===
Though he agreed with the soundness and overall purposes of Giddens' most expansive structuration concepts (i.e., against dualism and for the study of structure in concert with agency), John B. Thompson ("a close friend and colleague of Giddens at Cambridge University") wrote one of the most widely cited critiques of structuration theory. His central argument was that it needed to be more specific and more consistent both internally and with conventional social structure theory. Thompson focused on problematic aspects of Giddens' concept of structure as "rules and resources," focusing on "rules". He argued that Giddens' concept of rule was too broad.

Thompson claimed that Giddens presupposed a criterion of importance in contending that rules are a generalizable enough tool to apply to every aspect of human action and interaction; "on the other hand, Giddens is well aware that some rules, or some kinds or aspects of rules, are much more important than others for the analysis of, for example, the social structure of capitalist societies." He found the term to be imprecise and to not designate which rules are more relevant for which social structures.

Thompson used the example of linguistic analysis to point out that the need for a prior framework which to enable analysis of, for example, the social structure of an entire nation. While semantic rules may be relevant to social structure, to study them "presupposes some structural points of reference which are not themselves rules, with regard to which [of] these semantic rules are differentiated" according to class, sex, region and so on. He called this structural differentiation.

Rules differently affect variously situated individuals. Thompson gave the example of a private school which restricts enrollment and thus participation. Thus rules—in this case, restrictions—"operate differentially, affecting unevenly various groups of individuals whose categorization depends on certain assumptions about social structures." The isolated analysis of rules does not incorporate differences among agents.

Thompson claimed that Giddens offered no way of formulating structural identity. Some "rules" are better conceived of as broad inherent elements that define a structure's identity (e.g., Henry Ford and Harold Macmillan are "capitalistic"). These agents may differ, but have important traits in common due to their "capitalistic" identity. Thompson theorized that these traits were not rules in the sense that a manager could draw upon a "rule" to fire a tardy employee; rather, they were elements which "limit the kinds of rules which are possible and which thereby delimit the scope for institutional variation." It is necessary to outline the broader social system to be able to analyze agents, actors, and rules within that system.

Thus Thompson concluded that Giddens' use of the term "rules" is problematic. "Structure" is similarly objectionable: "But to adhere to this conception of structure, while at the same time acknowledging the need for the study of 'structural principles,' 'structural sets' and 'axes of structuration,' is simply a recipe for conceptual confusion."

Thompson proposed several amendments. He requested sharper differentiation between the reproduction of institutions and the reproduction of social structure. He proposed an altered version of the structuration cycle. He defined "institutions" as "characterized by rules, regulations and conventions of various sorts, by differing kinds and quantities of resources and by hierarchical power relations between the occupants of institutional positions." Agents acting within institutions and conforming to institutional rules and regulations or using institutionally endowed power reproduce the institution. "If, in so doing, the institutions continue to satisfy certain structural conditions, both in the sense of conditions which delimit the scope for institutional variation and the conditions which underlie the operation of structural differentiation, then the agents may be said to reproduce social structure."

Thompson also proposed adding a range of alternatives to Giddens' conception of constraints on human action. He pointed out the paradoxical relationship between Giddens' "dialectic of control" and his acknowledgement that constraints may leave an agent with no choice. He demanded that Giddens better show how wants and desires relate to choice.

Giddens replied that a structural principle is not equivalent with rules, and pointed to his definition from A Contemporary Critique of Historical Materialism: "Structural principles are principles of organisation implicated in those practices most "deeply" (in time) and "pervasively" (in space) sedimented in society", and described structuration as a "mode of institutional articulation" with emphasis on the relationship between time and space and a host of institutional orderings including, but not limited to, rules.

Ultimately, Thompson concluded that the concept of structure as "rules and resources" in an elemental and ontological way resulted in conceptual confusion. Many theorists supported Thompson's argument that an analysis "based on structuration's ontology of structures as norms, interpretative schemes and power resources radically limits itself if it does not frame and locate itself within a more broadly conceived notion of social structures."

=== Change ===
Sewell provided a useful summary that included one of the theory's less specified aspects: the question "Why are structural transformations possible?" He claimed that Giddens' overrelied on rules and modified Giddens' argument by re-defining "resources" as the embodiment of cultural schemas. He argued that change arises from the multiplicity of structures, the transposable nature of schemas, the unpredictability of resource accumulation, the polysemy of resources and the intersection of structures.

The existence of multiple structures implies that the knowledgeable agents whose actions produce systems are capable of applying different schemas to contexts with differing resources, contrary to the conception of a universal habitus (learned dispositions, skills and ways of acting). He wrote that "Societies are based on practices that derived from many distinct structures, which exist at different levels, operate in different modalities, and are themselves based on widely varying types and quantities of resources. ...It is never true that all of them are homologous."

Originally from Bourdieu, transposable schemas can be "applied to a wide and not fully predictable range of cases outside the context in which they were initially learned." That capacity "is inherent in the knowledge of cultural schemas that characterizes all minimally competent members of society."

Agents may modify schemas even though their use does not predictably accumulate resources. For example, the effect of a joke is never quite certain, but a comedian may alter it based on the amount of laughter it garners regardless of this variability.

Agents may interpret a particular resource according to different schemas. E.g., a commander could attribute his wealth to military prowess, while others could see it as a blessing from the gods or a coincidental initial advantage.

Structures often overlap, confusing interpretation (e.g., the structure of capitalist society includes production from both private property and worker solidarity).

=== Technology ===
This theory was adapted and augmented by researchers interested in the relationship between technology and social structures, such as information technology in organizations. DeSanctis and Poole proposed an "adaptive structuration theory" with respect to the emergence and use of group decision support systems. In particular, they chose Giddens' notion of modalities to consider how technology is used with respect to its "spirit". "Appropriations" are the immediate, visible actions that reveal deeper structuration processes and are enacted with "moves". Appropriations may be faithful or unfaithful, be instrumental and be used with various attitudes.

Wanda Orlikowski applied the duality of structure to technology: "The duality of technology identifies prior views of technology as either objective force or as socially constructed product–as a false dichotomy." She compared this to previous models (the technological imperative, strategic choice, and technology as a trigger) and considered the importance of meaning, power, norms, and interpretive flexibility. Orlikowski later replaced the notion of embedded properties for enactment (use). The "practice lens" shows how people enact structures which shape their use of technology that they employ in their practices. While Orlikowski's work focused on corporations, it is equally applicable to the technology cultures that have emerged in smaller community-based organizations, and can be adapted through the gender sensitivity lens in approaches to technology governance.

Workman, Ford and Allen rearticulated structuration theory as structuration agency theory for modeling socio-biologically inspired structuration in security software. Software agents join humans to engage in social actions of information exchange, giving and receiving instructions, responding to other agents, and pursuing goals individually or jointly.

=== Four-flows-model ===
The four flows model of organizing is grounded in structuration theory. McPhee and Pamela Zaug (2001) identify four communication flows that collectively perform key organizational functions and distinguish organizations from less formal social groups:

- Membership negotiation—socialization, but also identification and self-positioning;
- Organizational self-structuring—reflexive, especially managerial, structuring and control activities;
- Activity coordination—Interacting to align or adjust local work activities;
- Institutional positioning in the social order of institutions—mostly external communication to gain recognition and inclusion in the web of social transactions.

=== Group communication ===
Poole, Seibold, and McPhee wrote that "group structuration theory," provides "a theory of group interaction commensurate with the complexities of the phenomenon."

The theory attempts to integrate macrosocial theories and individuals or small groups, as well as how to avoid the binary categorization of either "stable" or "emergent" groups.

Waldeck et al. concluded that the theory needs to better predict outcomes, rather than merely explaining them. Decision rules support decision-making, which produces a communication pattern that can be directly observable. Research has not yet examined the "rational" function of group communication and decision-making (i.e., how well it achieves goals), nor structural production or constraints. Researchers must empirically demonstrate the recursivity of action and structure, examine how structures stabilize and change over time due to group communication, and may want to integrate argumentation research.

=== Public relations ===
Falkheimer claimed that integrating structuration theory into public relations (PR) strategies could result in a less agency-driven business, return theoretical focus to the role of power structures in PR, and reject massive PR campaigns in favor of a more "holistic understanding of how PR may be used in local contexts both as a reproductive and [transformational] social instrument." Falkheimer portrayed PR as a method of communication and action whereby social systems emerge and reproduce. Structuration theory reinvigorates the study of space and time in PR theory. Applied structuration theory may emphasize community-based approaches, storytelling, rituals, and informal communication systems. Moreover, structuration theory integrates all organizational members in PR actions, integrating PR into all organizational levels rather than a separate office. Finally, structuration reveals interesting ethical considerations relating to whether a social system should transform.

=== COVID-19 and structure ===
The COVID-19 pandemic had huge impact on society since the beginning. When investigating those impacts, many researchers found helpful using structuration theory to explain the change in society. Oliver (2021) used "a theoretical framework derived from Giddens' structuration theory to analyze societal information cultures, concentrating on information and health literacy perspectives." And this framework focused on "the three modalities of structuration, i.e., interpretive schemes, resources, and norms." And in Oliver's research, those three modalities are "resources", "information freedom" and "formal and informal concepts and rules of behavior". After analyzing four countries framework, Oliver and his research team concluded "All our case studies show a number of competing information sources – from traditional media and official websites to various social media platforms used by both the government and the general public – that complicate the information landscape in which we all try to navigate what we know, and what we do not yet know, about the pandemic."

In the research of interpreting how remote work environment change during COVID-19 in South Africa, Walter (2020) applied structuration theory because "it addresses the relationship between actors (or persons) and social structures and how these social structures ultimately realign and conform to the actions of actors" Plus, "these social structures from Giddens's structuration theory assist people to navigate through everyday life."

Zvokuomba (2021) also used Giddens' theory of structuration "to reflect at the various levels of fragilities within the context of COVID-19 lockdown measures." One example in the research is that "theory of structuration and agency point to situations when individuals and groups of people either in compliance or defiance of community norms and rules of survival adopt certain practices." And during pandemic, researched pointed out "reverting to the traditional midwifery became a pragmatic approach to a problem." One example to support this point is that "As medical centers were partly closed, with no basic medication and health staff, the only alternative was seek traditional medical services. "

=== Business and structure ===
Structuration theory can also be used in explaining business related issues including operating, managing and marketing.

Clifton Scott and Karen Myers (2010)studied how the duality of structure can explain the shifts of members' actions during the membership negotiations in an organization by This is an example of how structure evolves with the interaction of a group of people.

Another case study done by Dutta (2016) and his research team shows how the models shift because of the action of individuals. The article examines the relationship between CEO's behavior and a company's cross-border acquisition. This case can also demonstrate one of the major dimensions in the duality of structure, the sense of power from the CEO. Authors found out that the process follows the theory of duality of structure: under the circumstances of CEO is overconfident, and the company is the limitation of resources, the process of cross-border acquisition is likely to be different than before.

Yuan ElaineJ (2011)'s research focused on a certain demographic of people under the structure. Authors studied Chinese TV shows and audiences' flavor of the show. The author concludes in the relationship between the audience and the TV shows producers, audiences' behavior has higher-order patterns.

Pavlou and Majchrzak argued that research on business-to-business e-commerce portrayed technology as overly deterministic. The authors employed structuration theory to re-examine outcomes such as economic/business success as well as trust, coordination, innovation, and shared knowledge. They looked beyond technology into organizational structure and practices, and examined the effects on the structure of adapting to new technologies. The authors held that technology needs to be aligned and compatible with the existing "trustworthy" practices and organizational and market structure. The authors recommended measuring long-term adaptations using ethnography, monitoring and other methods to observe causal relationships and generate better predictions.

== See also ==
- Action theory (sociology)
- Archaeology of religion and ritual
- A Community of Witches § Wicca as a religion of late modernity
- Comparative contextual analysis
- Constitutive criminology
- Grand theory
- Health geography
- Macrosociology
- Social change
- Sociology of space
- Text and conversation theory
