= Microsociology =

Branch of sociology focusing on small-scale aspects of society

Microsociology is one of the main levels of analysis (or focuses) of sociology, concerning the nature of everyday human social interactions and agency on a small scale: face to face. Microsociology is based on subjective interpretative analysis rather than statistical or empirical observation, and shares close association with the philosophy of phenomenology. Methods include symbolic interactionism and ethnomethodology; ethnomethodology in particular has led to many academic sub-divisions and studies such as micro-linguistical research and other related aspects of human social behaviour. Macrosociology, by contrast, concerns the social structure and broader systems.

== Theory ==
Microsociology exists both as an umbrella term for perspectives which focus on agency, such as Max Weber's theory of social action, and as a body of distinct techniques, particularly in American sociology. The term was conceived by Georges Gurvitch in 1939, borrowing the term from the micro-physics and referring to the irreducible and unstable nature of everyday forms of sociality. It also provided an extra dimension between the studies of social psychology, sociology, and social anthropology—focusing more on individual interaction and thinking within groups, rather than just large social group/societal behaviour. At the micro level, social status and social roles are the most important components of social structure. Microsociology forms an important perspective in many fields of study, including modern psychosocial studies, conversational analysis and human-computer interaction. Microsociology continues to have a profound influence on research in all human fields, often under other names.

== Competing frames of reference ==
Some have considered that face-to-face interaction can be studied in at least three distinct (if overlapping) ways: psychology; intersubjectivity; and microsociology.

Erving Goffman however saw a central tension between Durkheimian approaches, and those drawn from ethology, especially in respect of interpersonal ritual; while followers of him have seen in a Durkheimian microsociology the key to the understanding of large-scale social conflict as well. Erving Goffman's theories of social interaction challenged other sociologists to redirect their focus to the questionable aspects of social behavior. Contrary to Erving Goffman's theory, Émile Durkheim believed that advanced methodological principles should guide sociologists and that they should research social fact.

== Influences ==
Sartre, in his work on the phenomenology of social dynamics, Critique of Dialectical Reason, written in the late 1950s, called microsociology the only valid theory of human relations. Jürgen Habermas and Pierre Bourdieu are two more recent theorists who have put microsociological concepts to good use in their works. R.D. Laing was much influenced by Garfinkel's ideas on "degradation ceremonies".

== (Humanistic) social work ==
Key issues, categories and principles of the microsociology, such as human relations, face-to-face interaction, interpretive/qualitative analysis, attachment and empathy, micro-level analysis, human behavior, micro-community, everyday human life, human context, microculture, focus on agency, have influenced and still influences today the social work theory and practice, having a crucial role in the emergence of humanistic social work (Petru Stefaroi), as response to the structural and systemic social work, which theoretically originates from macrosociology or mesosociology. This is why Malcolm Payne considers microsociology a fundamental theoretical-methodological source of this postmodern and innovative orientation from the contemporary social work, especially of the humanistic social work practice.

== Research ==
Research begins by evaluating the social life of the individuals with the goal of showing the reciprocal relationship between events/actions and the nature of the societal context in which they occur.

Empirical evidence from recorded conversations and the microsociology of emotion has proved of particular interest to students of interaction ritual.

== See also ==
- Generalized other
- George Herbert Mead
- Human ethology
- Kurt Lewin
- Proxemics
- Socialization
