= Timeline of sociology =

This is a timeline of sociology. Each entry lists important works published during that decade.

- 1810s in sociology
- 1820s in sociology
- 1830s in sociology
- 1840s in sociology
- 1850s in sociology
- 1860s in sociology
- 1870s in sociology
- 1880s in sociology
- 1890s in sociology
- 1900s in sociology
- 1910s in sociology
- 1920s in sociology
- 1930s in sociology
- 1940s in sociology
- 1950s in sociology
- 1960s in sociology
- 1970s in sociology
- 1980s in sociology
- 1990s in sociology
- 2000s in sociology
- 2010s in sociology
- 2020s in sociology

== See also ==
- History of sociology
