= List of years in anthropology =

The following entries cover events related to the study of anthropology which occurred in the listed year.

== 1800s-1900s ==
1870-1879
1880-1889
1890-1899
1900-1909
1910-1919
1920-1929
1930-1939
1940-1949
1950-1959
1960-1969
1970-1979
1980-1989
1990-1999

== 2000s- ==
2000-2009
2010-2019

== See also ==
- List of years in philosophy
- List of years in archaeology
- List of years in literature
- List of years in art

Please see the WikiProject page for formatting standards.
