= 1900s in comics =

- 1890s
- 1900s in comics
- 1910s
Other topics in 1900s:
- Anthropology
- Fashion
- Science and technology
- Sociology
- Television

This is a timeline of significant events in comics in the 1900s.

== 1900 ==
- January 7: Carl E. Schultze's Foxy Grandpa makes its debut. It will run until 1939.
- March 11: Frederick Burr Opper's Happy Hooligan makes its debut in the Hearst newspaper Sunday pages.
- May 27: Frank Crane's Willie Westinghouse Edison Smith, the Boy Inventor makes its debut.
- September 16: Gus Dirks' Latest News from Bugville makes its debut. It will run until 9 March 1902.
- December: Richard F. Outcault's Poor Li'l Mose is the first comic strip to star a black character. The series will run until August 1902.
- December 30: John Campbell Cory launches Lariat Pete. The comic series will run until 1902.
- Johannes Franciscus Nuijens (Korporaal Achilles), a Dutch Catholic teacher, publishes the political comic book Aanleiding tot den Engelsch-Transvaalschen Oorlog (Reason for the English-Transvaal War).
- Arpad Schmidhammer draws the text comic Totentanz der Politik, a satire on war politics, with the Grim Reaper as its star.

== 1901 ==
- February 11: The regular weather cartoon feature Weatherbird makes its debut in the St. Louis Post-Dispatch. The first artist to draw it is Harry B. Martin.
- May 25: The final issue of the British comics magazine Funny Wonder is published.
- September 22: Frederick Burr Opper's Alphonse and Gaston makes its debut. It will run until 1937.
- October 2: Gene Carr's Lady Bountiful makes its debut. It is the first comic starring a female protagonist.
- October 5: The first issue of the Dutch illustrated satirical weekly De Ware Jacob is published. It will run until April 1916.
- October 31: The Canadian Arthur Racey creates The Englishman in Canada, a cartoon feature with speech balloons in The Montreal Star. It will run until 1902.
- November 11: William Wallace Denslow's Billy Bounce makes its debut and will run until 1906.
- December 1: Frank Crane's Muggsy makes its debut.
- Norman E. Jennett's The Monkey Shines of Marseleen is first published.
- James Francis Sullivan's long-running comic strip The British Working Man is discontinued.

== 1902 ==
- March 9: The final episode of Gus Dirks' Latest News from Bugville is published. The artist will commit suicide three months later.
- April 6: Ed Carey's Simple Simon makes its debut. It will run until 10 January 1909.
- April 27: Ed Payne's Professor O. Howe Wise and Professor I.B. Schmart debuts, which will continue until 1911.
- May 4: Richard F. Outcault's Buster Brown makes its debut.
- June 2: In Cleveland, Ohio the Newspaper Enterprise Association is founded, which will become the oldest and longest-running comic strip syndicate in the world.
- August: The final episode of Richard F. Outcault's Poor Li'l Mose is published.
- August 31: In Rudolph Dirks' The Katzenjammer Kids, Der Captain makes his debut.
- September: Wilhelm Heinrich Detlev Körner's Hugo Hercules makes its debut. It will run until January 1903, but goes down in history as the first prototypical superhero comic.
- November 15: The final episode of J. Campbell Cory's Lariat Pete appears in print, by this point drawn by George Herriman.
- December 20: Raoul Barré publishes Pour un Dîner de Noël, the first Quebecois comic strip.
- Oskar Andersson's Mannen Som Gör Vad Som Faller Honom In (The Man Who Does Whatever Comes To His Mind) makes its debut. It will run until 1906.
- F. M. Howarth's Lulu and Leander makes its debut. It will run until 1908.
- Julius Stafford Baker's Casey Court makes its debut in Illustrated Chips. It will run continued by other artists until 1953.
- Kitazawa Rakuten creates Tagosaku to Mokubē no Tōkyō-Kenbutsu (田吾作と杢兵衛の東京見物,, "Tagosaku and Mokube's Sightseeing in Tokyo") and Haikara Kidorō no Sippai (灰殻木戸郎の失敗,, "The Failures of Kidoro Haikara" for the magazine Jiji Manga.
- Oliver E. Veal creates Aunt Tozer.

== 1903 ==
=== January ===
- January: The final episode of Wilhelm Heinrich Detlev Körner's Hugo Hercules is published.

=== February ===
- February 1: Ed Carey's Professor Hypnotiser makes its debut and will run until 23 July 1905.

=== March ===
- March 22: Grace Drayton's comic strip character Toodles (later known as Dolly Dimples) makes her debut. She will appear in various incarnations until 1933.

=== April ===
- April 5: Joseph A. Lemon's Willy Cute makes its debut. It will run until 1906.

=== May ===
- May 3: Red Shellcope's Jimmie the Messenger Boy makes its debut.

=== October ===
- October 4: Gustave Verbeek's The Upside Downs of Little Lady Lovekins and Old Man Muffaroo makes its debut. It will run until 15 January 1905.

=== November ===
- November 1: Jimmy Swinnerton's Mr. Jack receives its own Sunday page, after making his debut as a character in 1898.

=== December ===
- December 6: J.B. Lowitz' Swifty and his Wonderful Dream makes its debut.
- December: Clare Briggs's A. Piker Clerk makes his debut. The series wil run until June 1904.
- Paul Bransom's The Latest News From Bugville makes its debut. It will run until 1912.
- F. M. Howarth's Mr. E.Z. Mark makes its debut. It will run until 1908.
- James Montgomery Flagg creates Nervy Nat, which will run until 1907.
- C. M. Payne's Coon Hollow Folks debuts and will run until 1908.

=== Specific date unknown ===
- Karóly Mühlbeck starts his long-running series Mühlbeck headlines. in the weekly Új Idők.

== 1904 ==
=== January ===
- January 2: George Herriman's Major Ozone's Fresh Air Crusade makes its debut, syndicated by World Color Printing Co.
- January 3: The first issue of the Spanish illustrated children's magazine En Patufet is published. It will run until December 1938. Between 6 December 1968 and 29 June 1973 it will be revived.
- January 11: George Frink's Circus Solly makes its debut. It will run until 4 December 1911.
- January 30: Albéric Bourgeois's Les Aventures de Timothée makes its debut. The first serialized Canadian comic strip in the French language.

=== February ===
- February 14: Little Jimmy by Jimmy Swinnerton makes his debut in the New York Journal.

=== March ===
- March 5: Joseph Charlebois adapts Hector Berthelot's literary character Père Ladébauche into a comic strip for La Presse.

=== April ===
- April 16: Julius Stafford Baker creates the comic strip Mrs. Hippo's Kindergarten for The Daily Mirror, which features Tiger Tim who will become a popular spin-off comic in The Monthly Playbox from November 1904 on.
- April 20: George McManus's The Newlyweds makes its debut. It will run under various titles until 1956.
- April 22: Gus Mager starts his ... the Monk comics series, which will run until 1913.
- April 23: René-Charles Béliveau's La Famille Citrouillard makes its debut in La Patrie. The comic will continue until February 1905, after which he leaves it to T. Bisson.

=== June ===
- June: The final episode of Clare Briggs's A. Piker Clerk is published.

=== July ===
- July 24: Winsor McCay's Little Sammy Sneeze makes its debut in the New York Herald.
- July 24: Frederick Burr Opper's And Her Name Was Maud makes its debut. It will run until 14 October 1932.

=== August ===
- August 28: Walt McDougall's Queer Visitors from the Marvelous Land of Oz makes its debut, with L. Frank Baum as scriptwriter. It will run until 26 February 1905.

=== September ===
- September 10: Winsor McCay's Dream of the Rarebit Fiend makes its debut under the pseudonym Silas, in Evening Telegram.

=== October ===
- October 9: C. M. Payne's Bear Creek Folks debuts, which will run until 1912.

=== December ===
- December 17: Kin Hubbard's Abe Martin of Brown County makes its debut. It will run until 1930.
- December 31: The final issue of the French satirical comics and cartoons magazine La Caricature is published.
- The Dutch illustrator Jan Feith draws a silhouette comic telling the history of the Netherlands, for the satirical weekly De Ware Jacob.

== 1905 ==
=== January ===
- January 8: Winsor McCay's The Story of Hungry Henrietta makes its debut.
- January 15:
  - The final episode of Gustave Verbeek's The Upside Downs of Little Lady Lovekins and Old Man Muffaroo is published.
  - In Rudolph Dirks' The Katzenjammer Kids, Der Inspektor makes his debut.

=== February ===
- February 2: The first issue of the French girls' comics magazine La Semaine de Suzette is published. It will run until 25 August 1960. In its first issue Joseph Pinchon's text comic Bécassine makes its debut.
- February 26: The final episode of L. Frank Baum and Walt McDougall's Queer Visitors from the Marvelous Land of Oz is published.

=== May ===
- May 28: Gustave Verbeek's The Terror of the Tiny Tads makes its debut. It will run until 28 October 1914.

=== June ===
- June 26: Winsor McCay's A Pilgrim’s Progress makes its debut.

=== July ===
- July 22: A.D. Condo's The Outbursts of Everett True makes its debut. It will run until 1927.
- July 23: The final episode of Ed Carey's Professor Hypnotiser is published.

=== August ===
- August 13: The first episode of Gene Carr's The Bad Dream That Made Bill A Better Boy is published. But he passes it on to William Steinigans, who will continue the series until 1911.

=== October ===
- October 11: The first issue of the Brazilian comics magazine O Tico-Tico is published. It will run until 1977.
- October 15: Winsor McCay's Little Nemo in Slumberland makes its debut in the New York Herald. It will run until 26 December 1926

=== November ===
- November 26: C. M. Payne launches Scary William, a comic strip continued by many different artists until 2 June 1918.

=== Specific date unknown ===
- The first issue of the Chinese manhua magazine Journal of Current Pictorial is published and will run until 1913.

== 1906 ==
- January 14: After Richard F. Outcault has been bought away to another newspaper his comics series Buster Brown is continued in the old publication by Worden Wood.
- April 19: The first episode of Lyonel Feininger's Wee Willie Winkie's World is published. It will run until 17 February 1907.
- April 29: The first episode of Lyonel Feininger's The Kin-der-Kids is published. It will run until 18 November.
- June 17: The final episode of Joseph A. Lemon's Willy Cute is published.
- August 26: Frank Crane's Val the Ventriloquist makes its debut.
- September 14: The first issue of the French satirical illustrated magazine La Calotte is published.
- October 21: C.W. Kahles's Hairbreadth Harry makes its debut. It will run until 1940.
- The Bulgarian cartoonist Slavov creates a comic strip named Gordelivata Maca (The Proud Pussycat), based on the eponymous poem.

== 1907 ==
- January 5: The first issue of the Dutch satirical magazine De Notenkraker is published.
- February 17: The final episode of Lyonel Feininger's Wee Willie Winkie's World is published.
- May 13: Richard Thain's comic series Lord Longbow appears in print for the first time. It will run until 1915.
- September 29: Rube Goldberg's Mike and Ike (They Look Alike) makes its debut.
- October: A.D. Condo's Mr. Skygack, from Mars makes its debut. It will run until 1917.
- November 15: Bud Fisher's Mutt and Jeff makes its debut. It will run until 26 June 1983.
- November 26: Nell Brinkley makes her debut as a cartoonist. She will become well known for her Brinkley Girl illustrations.
- Leon Searl's Mrs. Timekiller makes its debut. It will run until 1915.
- Joseph Jacinto Mora creates Animaldom.
- Kate J. Fricero draws Les Distractions de Mll Nini in La Semaine de Suzette.

== 1908 ==
- May 3 to August 9: Harry Grant Dart's newspaper comic strip The Explorigator is first published.
- June 4: Louis Forton's Les Pieds Nickelés makes its debut.
- August 12: The first episode of William Steinigans's Pups is published. It will run until 1911.
- August 23: Grif's It's Only Ethelinda makes its debut.
- August 30: The final episode of Frank Crane's Val the Ventriloquist is published.
- December 27: The first issue of the Italian comics magazine Corriere dei Piccoli is published. In its first issue Attilio Mussino's Bilbolbul makes its debut. The series will run until 1933. The magazine itself will run until 15 August 1995.
- Harold R. Heaton joins the Inter-Ocean newspaper as an editorial cartoonist.
- Fontaine Fox's Toonerville Folks is published.
- Bertie Brown publishes Homeless Hector in Illustrated Chips, where it will run until the magazine's final issue in 1953.
- Henri Avelot creates Philibert.
- In France, the comic strip Sam et Sap by Émile Tap, is the first known French comic to use speech balloons.

== 1909 ==
- January 10: The final episode of Ed Carey's Simple Simon is published.
- February: Walt Kuhn's comic Whisk makes its debut and will run until October 1910.
- October 21: André Vallet and Jo Valle's L'Espiègle Lili makes its debut. It will run until 1998.
- November 1: John Hager's The Umbrella Man makes its debut in the Seattle Daily Times, appearing on the front page as a supplement for the weather. Not titled as the Umbrella Man, but called under that name on May 3, 1913, under a section called "Features of Today's Paper".
- November 27: C. M. Payne's Mr. Hush (later retitled Honeybunch's Hubby) debuts. It will continue until 1911 but be briefly revived between 1931 and 1934.
- December 23: The first episode of George Herriman's Gooseberry Sprig is published. Although it barely lasts a few weeks, it does introduce the characters Gooseberry Sprig, Joe Stork and the setting Coconino County, which will later reappear in his more famous comic Krazy Kat.
- December: Rose O'Neill's Kewpies comic strip is first published in Ladies' Home Journal. The characters will become very popular as toy articles in the following decades.
- Daan Hoeksema publishes De Neef van Prikkebeen, a follow-up to Rodolphe Töpffer's De Neef van Prikkebeen.

== Births ==
=== December ===
- December 5: Walt Disney, American animator, film producer, voice actor and businessman (Mr. George's Wife, Walt Disney's Comics & Stories), (d. 1966).

=== October ===
- October 21: Edmond Hamilton, American science fiction and comic writer (Space Ranger, DC Comics), (d. 1977).

=== February ===
- February 8: Cyril Gwyn Price, Welsh comics artist (PC Penny, Martha, Tricky Dicky), (d. 1970).
- February 17: Frans Piët, Dutch comics artist (Sjors en Sjimmie) (d. 1997)

=== December ===
- December 18: Ferd Johnson, American comics artist (Texas Slim, Lovey-Dovey, continued Moon Mullins), (d. 1996).

=== August ===
- August 21: Friz Freleng, American animator and cartoonist (Looney Tunes, Tweety and Sylvester, Yosemite Sam, The Pink Panther), (d. 1995).

=== March ===
- March 31: Ye Qianyu, Chinese comics artist (Mr. Wang), (d. 1995).

=== June ===
- June 18: Dave Gerard, American comics artist (Citizen Smith, Will-Yum), (d. 2003).

=== October ===
- October 13: Herbert Block, American political cartoonist, (d. 2001).
- October 26: Dante Quinterno, Argentine cartoonist and comics artist, (Patoruzú, Isidoro Cañones), (d. 2003).

== Deaths ==
=== 1900 ===
- May 17: Eduard Ille, German illustrator (made occasional prototypical comics), dies at age 77.

=== 1901 ===
- May 27: Fritz von Dardel, Swiss comics artist (Ett Frieri, Herrar Black & Smith på väg till Skandinavien, Familjen Tutings Lustresa till Bomarsund), dies at age 84.
- June 15: José Luis Pellicer, Spanish painter, illustrator and comics artist (made several picture stories), dies at age 59.

=== 1902 ===
- June 10: Gus Dirks, American comics artist (Latest News From Bugville, assistant on The Katzenjammer Kids), commits suicide at age 23.
- August 7: Eugène Cottin, French painter, illustrator, engraver and comics artist, passes away at age 60.
- December 7: Thomas Nast, American cartoonist, caricaturist, illustrator and comics artist, dies at age 62 of yellow fever.

=== 1904 ===
- March 8: Celso Hermínio, Portuguese caricaturist, illustrator and comics artist, dies at age 33 from pneumonia.
- December 1: A.L. Jansson, American comics artist (made text comics based on characters from playing cards), dies at age 48.

=== 1905 ===
- January 23: Rafael Bordalo Pinheiro, Portuguese illustrator, caricaturist and comics artist (Zé Povinho), dies at age 58.
- February 16: Dan McCarthy, American comics artist (Noah's Ark, The Streets of New York, continued Gay Gazoozaland and Lariat Pete), dies at age 44.
- September 28: Thomas Frank Beard, American illustrator and comics artist, dies at age 63.

=== 1906 ===
- April 19: Jan Linse, Dutch painter, caricaturist and comics artist (made comics for the satirical magazines Humoristisch Album and Abraham's Prikkie's Op- en Aanmerkingen), dies at age 62.
- June 26: Victor Géruzez, A.K.A. Crafty, French illustrator and comics artist, dies at age 66.
- July 3: Gédéon Baril, French comic artist (drew prototypical comics), dies at age 73.
- November 28: Oskar Andersson, aka O.A., Swedish comics artist (Mannen Som Gör Vad Som Faller Honom In (The Man Who Does Whatever Comes To His Mind), Urhunden), commits suicide at the age of 29.

=== 1907 ===
- August 25: Josef Benedikt Engl, German caricaturist, lithographer and illustrator (made occasional text comics), dies at age 40.

=== 1908 ===
- January 9: Wilhelm Busch, German illustrator, poet, painter, graphic artist and comics artist (Max und Moritz), dies at age 75.
- January 19: Georgi Danchov, Bulgarian illustrator, caricaturist, painter and comics artist (The Six Feelings), passes away at age 61.
- September 4: Théophile Hyacinthe Busnel, French illustrator and comics artist (Farces du Petit Cousin Charlot, continued Les Aventures de Timothée), dies from TBC at age 25 or 26.
- September 17: Henri Julien, Canadian painter, caricaturist, illustrator and comics artist, passes away at age 56.
- September 22: F. M. Howarth, American comics artist (The Love of Lulu and Leander, Mr. E.Z. Mark, Ole Opey Dildock), dies at age 43 of pneumonia.
- Specific date unknown: Eduardo Sojo, Argentinian comic artist (Don Quijote), dies at age 58 or 59.

=== 1909 ===
- February 25: Caran d'Ache, French caricaturist, cartoonist and comics artist, dies at age 50.
- May 11: Ferdinand von Řezníček, Austrian painter, illustrator and caricaturist (made some pantomime comics), dies at age 40.
- September 20: Achille Lemot, aka Uzès and Lilio, French illustrator (made occasional text comics), dies at age 62.
