= 1880s in sociology =

- 1870s
- 1880s in sociology
- 1890s
Other topics in 1880s:
- Anthropology
- Fashion

The following events related to sociology occurred in the 1880s.

== 1881 ==
Pierre Guillaume Frédéric le Play creates the sociological magazine La Reforme Sociale.

== 1882 ==
- Friedrich Nietzsche's The Gay Science is published.
- Leslie Stephen's The Science of Ethics is published.

== 1883 ==
- Lester Frank Ward's Dynamic Sociology is published.
- Francis Galton's Inquiries into Human Faculty and Its Development is published.
- Thomas Hill Green's Prolegomena to Ethics is published.
- Ludwig Gumplowicz's Race Struggle is published.
- Carl Menger's Investigations into the Method of the Social Sciences with Special Reference to Economics is published.
- Friedrich Nietzsche's Thus Spoke Zarathustra is published.
- Henry Sidgwick's Principles of Political Economy is published.
- William Sumner's What Social Classes Owe Each Other is published.

=== Births ===
- February 8: Joseph Schumpeter

=== Deaths ===
- March 9: Arnold Toynbee
- March 14: Karl Marx

== 1884 ==
- Friedrich Engels' The Origin of the Family, Private Property and the State is published.
- Carl Menger's The Errors of Historicism is published.
- Gaetano Mosca's Theory of Governments and Parliamentary Government is published.
- Foundation of the Fabian Society

== 1885 ==
- Ludwig Gumplowicz's Outline for Sociology is published.
- Sir Henry James Sumner Maine's Popular Government is published.
- The Second Volume of Karl Marx's Capital is published (edited by Engels).

== 1886 ==
- Friedrich Nietzsche's Beyond Good and Evil is published.
- Jose Rizal's Dimanche des Rameaux is published in Berlin.

== 1887 ==
- Friedrich Nietzsche's On the Genealogy of Morals is published.
- Ferdinand Tönnies' Gemeinschaft and Gesellschaft is published.

== 1888 ==
- James Bryce's The American Commonwealth is published.

=== Births ===
- July 6: Eugen Rosenstock-Huessy

=== Deaths ===
- February 3: Henry Maine

== 1889 ==
- Jane Addams establishes The Social Settlement in Chicago.
- Henri Bergson's Time and Free Will is published.
- Jose Rizal's Filipinas dentro de cien años, a socio-political essay, is published in Madrid.
