= 1920s in sociology =

- 1910s
- 1920s in sociology
- 1930s
Other topics in 1920s:
- Anthropology
- Comics
- Fashion
- Music
- Science and technology
- Television

The following events related to sociology occurred in the 1920s.

== 1920 ==
- Morris Ginsberg's The Psychology of Society is published.
- Robert Lowie's primitive society is published.
- György Lukács' The Theory of the Novel is published.
- Walter Benjamin's Theological-Political Fragment is written.

== 1921 ==
- James Bryce's Modern Democracies is published.
- Sigmund Freud's Group Psychology and the Analysis of the Ego is published.
- Robert E. Park's and Ernest Burgess's The Science of Sociology is published.
- Alfred Radcliffe-Brown's The Andaman Islanders is published.
- R.H. Tawney's The Acquisitive Society is published.
- Max Weber's The City is published.
- Ludwig Josef Johann Wittgenstein's Tractatus Logico-Philosophicus is published.
- Edward C. Hayes serves as president of the ASA.
- National Council for the Social Studies is founded

== 1922 ==
- Lucien Lévy-Bruhl's Primitive Mentality is published.
- Alexander Carr-Saunders' The Population Problem is published.
- Franklin Giddings' Studies in the Theory of Human Society is published.
- Leonard Trelawny Hobhouse's Elements of Social Justice is published.
- Bronisław Malinowski's Argonauts of the Western Pacific is published.
- Robert Park's The Immigrant Press and Its Control is published.
- Ferdinand Tönnies' Kritik der öffentlichen Meinung (On Public Opinion) is published.
- Max Weber's Economy and Society is published in two volumes (edited by Marianne Weber).
- Max Weber's Science as a Vocation is published.
- James P. Lichtenberg serves as president of the American Sociological Association.
- Howard W. Odum founds the Journal of Social Forces

=== Births ===
- March 18: Seymour Martin Lipset
- June 11: Erving Goffman

== 1923 ==
- Nels Anderson's and the Council of Social Agencies of Chicago's The Hobo is published.
- Victor Branford's Science and sanctity : a study in the scientific approach to unity is published.
- Georg Lukács' History and Class Consciousness is published.
- George Herbert Mead's Scientific Method and the Moral Sciences is published.
- William F. Ogburn's Social Change With Respect to Culture and Original Nature is published.
- W. I. Thomas's The Unadjusted Girl is published.
- Max Weber's General Economic History is published.
- Ulysses G. Weatherly serves as president of the ASA.
- Founding of the Social Sciences Research Council

=== Deaths ===
- August 19: Vilfredo Pareto

== 1924 ==
- Franklin Giddings' The Scientific Study of Human Society is published.
- Leonard Trelawny Hobhouse's Social Development: Its nature and companions is published.
- George Herbert Mead's The Genesis of the Self and Social Control is published.
- Helmuth Plessner's Limits of Community: A Critique of Social Radiclaism is published.
- Albion Small's Origins of Sociology is published.
- Max Scheler's Essays Toward a Sociology of Knowledge is published.
- Charles A. Ellwood serves as president of the ASA.

=== Births ===
- August 10: Jean-François Lyotard

== 1925 ==
- Alfred Louis Kroeber's Handbook of the Indians of California is published.
- Marcel Mauss' The Gift is published.
- Robert Ezra Park's The City is published.
- Pitirim Sorokin's The Sociology of Revolution is published.

== 1926 ==
- Hans Freyer's Belief, Style and The State is published.
- Bronislaw Malinowski's Crime and Custom in Savage Society is published.
- Max Scheler's Sociology of Knowledge is published.
- R. H. Tawney's Religion and the Rise of Capitalism is published.
- Ferdinand Tönnies' Property is published.

== 1927 ==
- Franz Boas' Primitive Art is published.
- Alexander Carr-Saunders' The Social Structure of England and Wales is published.
- Sigmund Freud's The Future of An Illusion is published.
- Robert H. Lowie's Origins of the State is published.
- Bronislaw Malinowski's Sex and Repression in Savage Society is published.
- Martin Heidegger's Being and Time is published.
- Pitirim Sorokin's Social Mobility is published.
- William Sumner's and Andrew Kellner's The Science of Society is published.
- W. I. Thomas serves as president of the ASA.

=== Births ===
- December 8: Niklas Luhmann

== 1928 ==
- Melville Jean Herskovits' The American Negro is published.
- Robert Morrison MacIver's Community is published.
- Karl Mannheim's Essays on the Sociology of Knowledge is published.
- Margaret Mead's Coming of Age in Samoa is published.
- Max Scheler's Social Mobility is published.
- Louis Wirth's The Ghetto is published.

== 1929 ==
- Hans Freyer's Sociology as a Science of Reality is published.
- Helen Merrell Lynd's and Robert Staughton Lynd's Middletown: A study in Contemporary American Culture is published.
- Bronislaw Malinowski's The Sexual Life of Savages is published.
- Karl Mannheim's Ideology and Utopia is published.
- Marc Bloch and Lucien Febvre found the Annales School in Strasbourg.
- Morris Ginsberg take over the chair of Sociology at the LSE.
