= 1910s in comics =

- 1900s
- 1910s in comics
- 1920s
Other topics in 1910s:
- Anthropology
- Fashion
- Science and technology
- Sociology

This is a timeline of significant events in comics in the 1910s.

== 1910 ==
- January 24: The final episode of George Herriman's Gooseberry Sprig is published.
- March 29 - June 29: Herbert Crowley draws The Wigglemuch.
- June 20: George Herriman's The Dingbat Family makes its debut, syndicated by the precursors of King Features Syndicate, appearing in Hearst newspapers.
- July 17: The final episode of Grif's It's Only Ethelinda is published.
- July 26: In the panel edge of The Dingbat Family by George Herriman, a cat and a mouse make their debut. The characters will later evolve into Krazy Kat and Ignatz Mouse .
- September: George Frink's Slim Jim and the Force makes its debut. It will run until 1937 by other artists.
- October: The final episode of Walt Kuhn's Whisk is published.
- Tad Dorgan's Judge Rummy makes its debut.
- The first issue of the Belgian satirical cartoons and comics magazine Pourquoi pas? is published.
- Dutch illustrator David Bueno de Mesquita creates the prototypical comic book De Geschiedenis van Gulzigen Tobias.
- José Robledano draws El Suero Maravilloso.
- C. M. Payne's Those Kids Next Door debuts, which will change its title to Nippy's Pop in 1911, until finally becoming S'Matter, Pop?. It will continue until 1940.

== 1911 ==
- January: The first issue of the Flemish children's comics magazine Kindervriend is published. It will run until 1940.
- January 1: Ed Payne's Professor O. Howe Wise and Professor I.B. Schmart comes to an end, after having run since 1902.
- April 16: William Steinigans publishes the final episode of The Bad Dream That Made Bill A Better Boy and Pups.
- April 23: The first episode of William Steinigans' Splinters is published. It will run until 1912.
- October 18: The first issue of the Flemish children's comics magazine Het Mannekensblad is published. It will appear until 1914.
- October 31: The first episode of Officer Crust by Robert E. Brook is published. The series will run until Brook's death in 1918.
- December 4: The final episode of George Frink's Circus Solly is published.
- Antonio Rubino's Quadratino makes its debut.
- The first issue of the Flemish children's comics magazine De Geïllustreerde Kinderwereld is published.
- Dutch cartoonist Leendert Jordaan publishes the pantomime comic Het Leven in Karikatuur in the magazine Het Leven. The series will appear until 1936.
- Hungarian cartoonist Bit (A.K.A. Nándor Honti) creates the pantomime comics series Séta Álomországban. One particular episode, A Francia Bonne Álma (A French Nanny's Dream), attracts the interest of psychologists Sándor Ferenczi and Sigmund Freud.

== 1912 ==
- February 5: Sidney Smith's Old Doc Yak makes its debut in the Chicago Tribune. It originated in his earlier strip Buck Nix for the Chicago Evening Journal.
- May 31: John Hager's Doc's Dippy Duck makes its debut in the Seattle Daily Times, appearing on the front page. Not formally named until February 10, 1915.
- September 1: The first episode of Mr. Hubby by William Steinigans is published. It will run until 1916.
- October 27: The final episode of William Steinigans' Splinters is published.
- November 7: Ernest Riebe's Mr. Block makes its debut in The Industrial Worker.
- December 4: Cliff Sterrett's Polly and Her Pals makes its debut in the New York Journal.
- The Journal of Current Pictorial resumed publication after earlier ban by Qing Dynasty.
- The first issue of the Italian comics magazine Lo Scolaro is published. It will run until 1972.
- Dutch illustrator Ko Doncker creates the comics character Piet Pelle for bicycle factory Gazelle.
- Knut Stangenberg creates Fridolf Celinder.

== 1913 ==
- January 12 - November 9: Raoul Barré's Noahzark Hotel (also known as À l'Hôtel du père Noé) makes its debut.
- January 12: George McManus' Bringing Up Father makes its debut. It will run uninterrupted until 28 May 2000.
- January 26: The first episode of Orville Peter Williams' Gasoline Gus is published. The series will run until 1915.
- February 23:
  - Gus Mager's Hawkshaw the Detective makes its debut.
  - Katharine P. Rice's Flora Flirt debuts and will run for more than a year.
  - Inez Townsend's Snooks and Snicks, the Mischievous Twins makes its debut and will run until 4 July 1915.
- March 16: Rudolph Dirks draws his final The Katzenjammer Kids gag and leaves his newspaper. They instantly hire a replacement artist, Harold Knerr, who continues the series in his place.
- March 31: Arthur R. "Pop" Momand's Keeping Up with the Joneses makes its debut. It will run until 16 April 1938.
- April 22: Chic Jackson's Roger Bean makes its debut. It will run until the artist's death in 1934.
- July 6: The final episode of Red Shellcope's Jimmie the Messenger Boy is published.
- July 19: Zif Dunstan's The Adventures of William Mug is published. It will run until 26 September 1914 as one of the earliest Australian comic strips.
- August 10 - December 7: Charles Forbell's Naughty Pete is published.
- October 28: George Herriman's Krazy Kat makes its debut. It will receive a Sunday page from 23 April 1916 on.
- December 29: Walter Hoban's Jerry on the Job makes its debut.
- Journal of Current Pictorial finally ceased publication.

== 1914 ==
- February 2: Harry Hershfield's Abie the Agent makes his debut.
- June: Rudolph Dirks's Hans und Fritz (later renamed The Captain and the Kids) makes its debut after a huge trial between him and his former newspaper boss William Randolph Hearst about the rights to The Katzenjammer Kids. Hearst won the case but Dirks was allowed to use the characters in a different newspaper, The New York World albeit under a different name.
- April 12: The final episode of Katharine P. Rice's Flora Flirt is published.
- June 14: William Donahey's The Teenie Weenies makes its debut.
- July 28: As the First World War leads to Belgium being occupied by German forces the Flemish comics magazine Het Mannekensblad is disestablished.
- September 26: The final episode of Zif Dunstan's The Adventures of William Mug is published.
- October 28: The final episode of Gustave Verbeek's The Terrors of the Tiny Tads is published.
- November 29: The final episode of Frank Crane's Willie Westinghouse Edison Smith, the Boy Inventor is published.
- December 26: The first issue of the British comics magazine Funny Wonder is published. It's a different version compared with the 1892-1901 version.
- Bruce Bairnsfather's Old Bill makes its debut.
- The first issue of the Flemish children's comics magazine De Geïllustreerde Kinderwereld is published.
- Clare Briggs's When A Feller Needs A Friend is first published.
- Rube Goldberg starts drawing the first of many Rube Goldberg machines.
- The final episode of Paul Bransom's The Latest News From Bugville is published.
- Bertie Brown creates The Brownie Boys in Rainbow, which is soon taken over by Freddie Crompton.

== 1915 ==
- 24 February: W.L. Wells creates the comic strip Old Nicodemus Nimble.
- March: Stuart Carothers's Charlie Chaplin's Comic Capers is first published. He will die on 4 October of that same year, causing the strip to be taken over by E.C. Segar.
- March 21: The first episode of J. Campbell Cory's Sunday comic Cory's Kids is launched. It will run until 1916.
- April 5: Charles Folkard's Teddy Tail makes its debut in The Daily Mail.
- May 23: Antonio Rubino's Italino makes its debut.
- July 4:
  - The final episode of Frank Crane's Muggsy is published.
  - The final episode of Inez Townsend's Snooks and Snicks, the Mischievous Twins is published.
- The final episode of Orville Peter Williams' Casoline Gus is published.
- August 16: Merrill Blosser's ' Freckles and His Friends makes its debut. It will run until 28 August 1971.
- August 23: The final episode of Richard Thain's comic series Lord Longbow is published, at this point drawn by Hugh Rankin.
- November 16: Newspaper publisher William Randolph Hearst and his manager Moses Koenigsberg establish King Features Syndicate, which brings all comics published by Hearst's papers under one syndication enterprise.
- The final episode of Leon Searl's Mrs. Timekiller is published.
- Kitazawa Rakuten creates Teino Nukesaku (丁野抜作,, "Nukesaku Teino").

== 1916 ==
- January 5: George Herriman's Baron Bean makes its debut. It will run until 1919.
- February 6: The final episode of John Campbell Cory's Cory's Kids appears in print.
- February 29: E.C. Segar draws the daily newspaper series Charlie Chaplin's Comic Capers for a few months, until 15 July.
- April: The final issue of the Dutch illustrated satirical weekly De Ware Jacob is published.
- June 24: Felix Hess creates the comic strip Uit het Kladschrift van Jantje, which will run until 1936.
- September 9: The final issue of the British comics magazine Ally Sloper's Half Holiday is published. Between 1922 and 1923, 1948 and 1949 and 1976 and 1977 it will be briefly revived.
- December 17: The final episode of Mr. Hubby by William Steinigans is published.
- Rebecca McCann's The Cheerful Cherub makes its debut.

== 1917 ==
- February 12: Sidney Smith's The Gumps makes its debut. It will run until 17 October 1959.
- March 11: The first issue of the Spanish comics magazine TBO is published.
- June 4: The first episode of Victor Forsythe's Joe Jinks is published. The series will run until June 1971.
- October 28: Sergio Tofano's Signor Bonaventura makes its debut in Il Corriere dei Piccoli.
- Gene Byrnes' Reg'lar Fellers makes its debut.
- Jan Lunde publishes the comic strip Pappa og Pjokken, one of the first Norwegian comic strips.

== 1918 ==
- January 2: Robert Moore Brinkerhoff's Little Mary Mixup makes its debut.
- June 2: The final episode of C. M. Payne's Scary William is published.
- June 9: Rube Goldberg's Boob McNutt makes its debut.
- August 21: Edwina Dumm's Cap Stubbs and Tippie makes its debut. It will run until 3 September 1966.
- August 25: Rudolph Dirks, who continued his The Katzenjammer Kids characters in The New York World under various titles after a 1913-1914 legal case against his former publisher William Randolph Hearst, now settles on a permanent new title: The Captain and the Kids. His series will continue under that name until 1979.
- November 24: Frank King's Gasoline Alley makes its debut. It will become one of the longest-running comics series of all time. Walt Wallet makes his debut on 15 December.
- December 16: A. E. Hayward's Somebody's Stenog makes its debut.
- December 17: Jimmy Murphy's Toots and Casper makes its debut.
- December 19: Robert L. Ripley's Ripley's Believe It or Not makes its debut.
- Harry J. Tuthill's The Bungle Family makes its debut.
- Frans Masereel publishes the pantomime graphic novel 25 Images de la Passion d'un Homme ("25 Images of a Man's Passion").
- Dutch illustrator David Bueno de Mesquita creates Billie Ritchie en Zijn Ezel, the first Dutch celebrity comic, in this case about film comedian Billie Ritchie.
- In Russia the news agency ROSTA is established, which will produce various propaganda pamphlets, among them posters and comics.

== 1919 ==
- January 22: The final episode of George Herriman's Baron Bean is published.
- May 4: Carl Ed's Harold Teen makes its debut.
- May 12: Bertram Lamb and Austin Bowen Payne's Pip, Squeak and Wilfred makes its debut.
- June 17: Billy DeBeck's Barney Google makes its debut. It will become one of the longest-running comics series of all time.
- June 22: The final episode of Sidney Smith's Old Doc Yak is published.
- December 18: Debut of E.C. Segar's Thimble Theatre, one of the longest-running newspaper comics of all time.
- December 19: The characters Ham Gravy and Olive Oyl make their debut in E.C. Segar's Thimble Theatre.
- Dora McLaren's Bobby Bear makes his debut in the Daily Herald.
- Frans Masereel publishes the pantomime graphic novel Mon Livre d'Heures ("Passionate Journey").
- Wilford Fawcett founds the American comics company Fawcett Publications.
- J.F. Horrabin's Japhet and Happy makes its debut under the title The Adventures of the Noah Family.
- Kristoffer Aamot and Jan Lunde start the comic strip Skomakker Bekk of Tvillingene Hans.

== Births ==
=== May ===
- May 22: Pieter Kuhn, Dutch comics artist (Kapitein Rob), (d. 1966).

=== May ===
- May 20: Gardner F. Fox, American comic book writer (Justice League, Batman, Flash, Green Lantern), (d. 1986).

=== August ===
- August 26: Otto Binder, American comic book writer (DC Comics), (d. 1974).

=== December ===
- December 8: Kin Platt, American caricaturist, radio writer, TV writer, animation writer, comics artist (Mr. and Mrs., Supermouse), (d. 2003).
- December 25: Burne Hogarth, American comics artist (continued Tarzan), (d. 1996)

=== February ===
- February 2: Creig Flessel, American comics artist (Sandman, Shining Knight), (d. 2008).
- February 14: Ollie Harrington, American comics artist (Dark Laughter), (d. 1995).

=== May ===
- May 2: Marten Toonder, Dutch comics writer and artist (Tom Poes, Panda, Kappie, Koning Hollewijn) (d. 2005).

=== September ===
- September 14: Phiny Dick, Dutch comics writer (Olle Kapoen, Birre Beer) and artist (Miezelientje), (d. 1990).

=== February ===
- February 15: Willy Vandersteen, Belgian comics writer and artist (Suske en Wiske, De Rode Ridder, Bessy, De Familie Snoek) (d. 1990).

=== May ===
- May 4: John Broome, American comic book writer (DC Comics, Flash, Green Lantern), (d. 1999).

=== August ===
- August 25: Walt Kelly, American comics writer and artist (Pogo), (d. 1973)

=== Specific date unknown ===
- Allan Borgström, Swedish comics artist (Phili Philin), (d. 2003).

=== January ===
- January 13: Jijé, Belgian comics artist (Blondin et Cirage, Jerry Spring, continued Spirou et Fantasio), (d. 1980)

=== February ===
- February 8: Bill Finger, American comic book writer and artist (DC Comics, Green Lantern, co-creator of Batman), (d. 1974).

=== June ===
- June 15: Saul Steinberg, Romanian-American cartoonist, (d. 1999).

=== July ===
- July 10: Joe Shuster, Canadian-American comic book writer and artist (Action Comics, Detective Comics, co-creator of Superman), (d. 1992).

=== August ===
- August 9: Tove Jansson, Finnish comic writer and artist (Moomins), (d. 2001).

=== September ===
- September 8: Alfred Mazure, Dutch comics writer and artist (Dick Bos), (d. 1974)

=== October ===
- October 17: Jerry Siegel, American comic book writer (DC Comics, Marvel Comics, Archie Comics), (d. 1996).

=== April ===
- April 25: Mort Weisinger, American comic book writer (DC Comics), (d. 1978).

=== June ===
- June 19: Julius Schwartz, American comic book writer and editor (DC Comics), (d. 2004).

=== October ===
- October 24: Bob Kane, American comic book writer and artist (co-creator of Batman), (d. 1998).

=== November ===
- November 4: Lo Hartog van Banda, Dutch comics writer (Marten Toonder), (d. 2006).

=== March ===
- March 2: Alex Graham, Scottish comics artist (Fred Basset), (d. 1991)
- March 6: Will Eisner, American comics writer and artist (Sheena, Queen of the Jungle, The Spirit, A Contract with God) and author (Comics & Sequential Art), (d. 2005).

=== May ===
- May 16: Hal Seeger, American animator, comics writer and comics artist (Batfink, Milton the Monster, assisted on the Betty Boop and Leave It to Binky comic strips), (d. 2005).

=== August ===
- August 11: Dik Browne, American comics writer and artist (Hagar the Horrible), (d. 1989)
- August 28: Jack Kirby, American comic book writer and artist (Marvel Comics, DC Comics), (d. 1994).

=== January ===
- January 10: Ken Ernst, American comics artist (continued Mary Worth), (d. 1985)

=== July ===
- July 8: Irwin Hasen, American comics artist (Dondi), (d. 2015)

=== October ===
- October 6: John Forte, American comic book artist (Superman, Legion of Super-Heroes), (d. 1966).
- October 16: Henri Vernes, Belgian novelist and comics writer (wrote the scripts to comic book adaptations of his own novel series Bob Morane), (d. 2021).

=== December ===
- December 21: Frank Hampson, British comics artist (Dan Dare), (d. 1985)

=== January ===
- January 3: Henk Sprenger, Dutch comics artist (Kick Wilstra), (d. 2005).
- January 29: Francisco V. Coching, Filipino comic artist, (d. 1998)

=== February ===
- February 19: Buth, Belgian comics artist (Thomas Pips), (d. 2010).

=== March ===
- March 22: Bernard Krigstein, American comics artist (Master Race), (d. 1990).

=== April ===
- April 15: Alberto Breccia, Argentine comic artist (Ernie Pike, Mort Cinder), (d. 1993)

=== May ===
- May 12: Vic Herman, American comics artist (Winnie the Wac), (d. 1999).

=== June ===
- June 3: Gene Hazelton, American comics artist (Hanna-Barbera comics), (d. 2005).

=== July ===
- July 23: Hector German Oesterheld, Argentine comics writer (Corto Maltese, Sergeant Kirk, El Eternauta, Ernie Pike, Mort Cinder), (d. 1977).

=== August ===
- August 13: Jim Mooney, American comic book artist and writer (DC Comics, Marvel Comics), (d. 2008).

=== September ===
- September 4: Pál Pusztai, Hungarian graphic artist and illustrator (Jucika, Iván és Joe), (d. 1970).
- September 9: Barbara Fiske Calhoun, known professionally as "Barbara Hall," American comics artist (Black Cat, Girl Commandos, Pat Parker, worked for Harvey Comics), (d. 2014).

=== November ===
- November 16: Pom, Belgian comics artist (Piet Pienter en Bert Bibber), (d. 2014).
- November 19: Georges Mazure, Dutch comic artist (continued Spot Morton, Horre, Harm en Hella), (d. 1980).

== Deaths ==
=== 1910 ===
- January 23: Angelo Agostini, Brazilian journalist, illustrator and comics artist (As Aventuras de Nhô Quim), dies at the age of 66.
- March 16: Tom Browne, British comics artist and illustrator (Weary Willy and Tired Tim), dies at age 49.
- March 23: Félix Nadar, French photographer, cartoonist, comics artist and caricaturist (Les Aventures Illustrées du Prince pour rire, Vie politique et littéraire de Viperin, journaliste et industriel, Vie publique et privée de Mossieu Réac), dies at age 89.

=== 1911 ===
- September 30: Franciszek Kostrzewski, Polish comics artist, illustrator, caricaturist, painter and cartoonist (Jedynaczek's Story in 32 Pictures), dies at age 85.
- October 29: Joseph Pulitzer, Hungarian-American newspaper publisher, launcher of the Sunday comics and major force behind the rise of the comics industry, dies at age 64.
- Specific date unknown: Walter H. Gallaway, American illustrator and comics artist (Citizen Fixit, Absent-Minded Augie), dies at age 40.

=== 1912 ===
- May 2: Homer Calvin Davenport, American cartoonist and comics artist (A Venetian Episode - How The Doves Did Davenport), dies at age 45.

=== 1913 ===
- January 20: José Guadalupe Posada, Mexican illustrator (made prototypical comics), dies at age 60.
- March 18: Henry Stull, Canadian-American comics artist, dies at age 61.
- July 19: Walther Caspari, German illustrator, caricaturist and comics artist, dies at age 43.

=== 1914 ===
- February 25: John Tenniel, British illustrator, cartoonist and comics artist (Mr. Spoonbill, Peter Piper, Alice in Wonderland, Alice Through the Looking-Glass), dies at age 93.
- March 4: Oswald Heidbrinck, French illustrator and comics artist, dies at age 53.
- May 3: Carsten Ravn, Danish illustrator, actor and comics artist, dies at age 53.
- July 21: René-Charles Béliveau, Canadian illustrator, caricaturist and comics artist (La Famille Citrouillard, Le Père Nicodème), dies at age 42 from TBC.
- October 21: R.W. Taylor, American comics artist (Yens Yensen), dies at age 36.
- December 9: Timoléon Lobricon, French painter and comics artist (Histoire de Mr. Tuberculus, Histoire de Mr. Grenouillet), dies at age 83.
- December 28: Faustin Betbeder, French caricaturist, illustrator and comics artist, dies at age 77.
- Specific date unknown:
  - Nollat, A.K.A. Louis Tallon, Jacques Talon, French caricaturist and comics artist (worked for Le Rire), dies at age 28 or 29.

=== 1915 ===
- March 29: William Wallace Denslow, American illustrator and comics artist (Billy Bounce), dies at age 58.
- June 15: Léonce Burret, French illustrator and comics artist, dies at age 49.
- June 22: Raymond Crawford Ewer, American comics artist (continued Slim Jim and the Force), dies at age 26 from TBC.
- October 4: Stuart Carothers, American comics artist (Charlie Chaplin's Comic Capers), dies at age 22 from defenestration.
- November 27: Fernand Fau, French comics artist, caricaturist and illustrator, dies at age 57.
- November 28: Georges Jordic-Pignon, French illustrator, painter and comics artist, dies in battle at age 39.
- December 28: Kobayashi Kiyochika, Japanese caricaturist, illustrator and comics artist (made sequential illustrations), dies at age 68.

=== 1916 ===
- August 21: Auguste Vimar, French illustrator and comics artist, dies at age 64.
- December 7: Art Bowen, American painter and comics artist (The Spotty Twins, Spotlight Steve in Vaudeville), commits suicide at age 35.

=== 1917 ===
- March 20: Paul Balluriau, French comics artist and illustrator, dies at age 56.
- April 7: Ko Doncker, Dutch comics artist and illustrator (Piet Pelle), dies at age 43.
- October 26: Frank Crane, American comics artist (Willie Westinghouse Edison Smith the Boy Inventor, Muggsy, Val the Ventriloquist, continued Professor Bughouse), dies at age 60.
- Specific date unknown:
- Oliver E. Veal, British comics artist (Aunt Tozer), dies at age 56 or 57.

=== 1918 ===
- January 25: William Steinigans, American comics artist (Pups, Splinters, Mr. Hubby, continued The Bad Dream That Made Bill A Better Boy), dies at age 39.
- January 27: José María Cao, Spanish-Argentine illustrator and comics artist, dies at age 55.
- February 12: Alphonse Lévy, French illustrator, painter and comics artist, dies at age 75.
- February 28: Robert Carter, American comics artist (Just Little Ones, Coffee and Sinkers), dies at age 44.
- August 3: Albert Hahn Sr., Dutch illustrator, cartoonist and comics artist, dies at age 41.
- September 10: Robert Brook, American comics artist (Officer Crust), dies at age 33.
- October 17: Hermann Vogel, German-French illustrator and comics artist, dies at age 62.
- December 23: Hans Horina, German comics artist (The Rhinoceros Boys), dies at age 63.

=== 1919 ===
- January 17: Henri Stein, Argentine editorial cartoonist and comic artist, dies at age 75.
- January 22: Carl Larsson, Swedish illustrator, painter and cartoonist, dies at age 65.
- January 28: Leon Searl, American comics artist and animator (Mrs. Timekiller), dies at age 38.
- December 9: Eugen von Baumgarten, German caricaturist, illustrator and comics artist, dies at age 54.
