= 1890s in anthropology =

- 1880s
- 1890s in anthropology
- 1900s
Other topics in 1890s:
- Comics
- Fashion
- Sociology

Timeline of anthropology, 1890–1899

== Events ==
1898

- The Cambridge Anthropological Expedition to the Torres Straits

== Publications ==
1897

- Le Suicide by Émile Durkheim

== Births ==
1891

- Pedro Bosch-Gimpera
- Herman Karl Haeberlin
- Zora Neale Hurston
- Abram Kardiner
- Géza Róheim

1897

- Theodora Kroeber
- George Peter Murdock
- Robert Redfield
- Benjamin Whorf

1898

- Ruth Bunzel
- Caroline Bond Day
- Marcel Griaule
- William Lloyd Warner

1899

- Daniel Garrison Brinton
- Ella Cara Deloria
- Walter Dyk
- Anna Hadwick Gayton
- Audrey Richards
