= 1910s in sociology =

- 1900s
- 1910s in sociology
- 1920s
Other topics in 1910s:
- Anthropology
- Comics
- Fashion
- Science and technology

The following events related to sociology occurred in the 1910s.

== 1910 ==
- Emily Greene Balch's Our Slavic Fellow Citizens is published.
- Lucien Lévy-Bruhl's How Natives Think is published.
- Albion Small's The Meaning of the Social Sciences is published.
- Franklin H. Giddings serves as president of the ASA.

=== Births ===
- July 5: Robert K. Merton
- August 11: George C. Homans

=== Deaths ===
- August 26: William James

== 1911 ==
- Franz Boas' The Mind of Primitive Man is published.
- Leonard Trelawny Hobhouse's Liberalism is published.
- György Lukács' The Soul and Its Forms is published.
- Robert Michels' Political Parties is published.
- Werner Sombart's Die Juden und das Wirtschaftsleben is published.
- Ernst Troeltsch's The Social Teaching of the Christian Churches is published.
- H. G. Wells' The New Machiavelli is published.
- Sidney Webb's and Beatrice Webb's Sphere of voluntary agencies in the prevention of destitution is published.

== 1912 ==
- Mary Coolidge's Why Women Are So is published.
- Émile Durkheim's The Elementary Forms of Religious Life is published.
- Maurice Halbwach's The Working class and standards of living, research on the needs in the hierarchy of contemporary industrial companies is published.
- Max Scheler's Ressentiment is published.
- Joseph Schumpeter's Theory of Economic Development is published.
- Ernst Troeltsch's Protestantism and Progress is published.
- Edward Alexander Westermarck's The Original Development of Moral Ideas is published.

== 1913 ==
- Sigmund Freud's Totem and Taboo is published.
- Frederic Harrison's The Positive Evolution of Religion is published.
- Leonard Trelawny Hobhouse's Development and Purpose: An Essay Towards a Philosophy of Evolution is published.
- Rosa Luxemburg's The Accumulation of Capital is published.
- Max Scheler's The Nature of Sympathy is published.
- Jessie Taft's The Women's Movement from the Standpoint of Social Consciousness is published.

== 1914 ==
- Victor Branford's Interpretations and forecasts; a study of survivals and tendencies in contemporary society
- Émile Durkheim's Pragmatism & the Question of Truth is published.
- Frederic Harrison's The Meaning of war for Labour is published.
- Ferdinand Tönnies' Gesetzmässigkeit in der Bewegung der Bevölkerung is published.
- Thorstein Veblen's The Instinct of Workmanship and the State of the Industrial Arts is published.
- Edward A. Ross serves as president of the ASA.
- Turkish philosopher Ziya Gökalp set up the first department of sociology in the Ottoman Turkey, at Istanbul University, and founded the Turkish Sociology.

=== Births ===
- May 22: Vance Packard

== 1915 ==
- James Bryce's Race Sentiment as a Factor in History is published.
- Charlotte Perkins Gilman's Herland is published.
- Alfred Louis Kroeber's The Eighteen Professions is published.

== 1916 ==
- Vladimir Ilyich Ulyanov Lenin's Imperialism, the Highest stage of Capitalism is published.
- Vilfredo Pareto's The Mind and Society (it: Trattato di Sociologia Generale) is published.
- Ferdinand de Saussure's Course in General Linguistics is published.
- Max Weber's The Religion of China: Confucianism and Taoism is published.
- George E. Vincent serves as president of the American Sociological Association.

=== Births ===
- August 28: C. Wright Mills

== 1917 ==
- Alfred Louis Kroeber's The Superorganic is published.
- Vladimir Ilyich Ulyanov Lenin's State and Revolution is published.
- Ferdinand Tönnies' The German State and The English State is published.
- Max Weber's The Religion of India: The Sociology of Hinduism and Buddhism is published.

== 1918 ==
- Charles Cooley's Social Association is published.
- Frederic Harrison's On Society is published.
- Karl Kautsky's The Dictatorship of the Proletariat is published.
- Benjamin Seebohm Rowntree's The Human Needs of Labour is published.
- W. I. Thomas and Florian Znaniecki's The Polish Peasant in Europe and America is published

=== Births ===
- October 16: Louis Althusser

== 1919 ==
- Sir Patrick Geddes' Our Social Inheritance is published.
- Frederic Harrison's On Jurisprudence and the Conflict of Laws is published.
- Johan Huizinga's The Waning of Middle Ages is published.
- Pitirim Sorokin's System of Sociology is published.
- Beatrice Webb's and Sidney Webb's History of Trade Unionism is published.
- Max Weber's Ancient Judaism is published.
- Florian Znaniecki's Cultural Reality is published.
- Frank W. Blackmar serves as president of the ASA.

=== Births ===
- May 10: Daniel Bell
- July 11: Antonina Kłoskowska

=== Deaths ===
- January 15: Rosa Luxemburg
