= Zif Dunstan =

Australian artist

- Born: George Edward Dunstan; 13 August 1876; Daylesford, Victoria
- Died: 21 August 1946 (aged 70); Fitzroy, Melbourne
- Occupations: Artist, cartoonist, caricaturist, illustrator, journalist, vaudeville performer

Signature
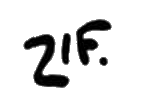

George Edward Dunstan (13 August 1876 – 1946), known as Zif Dunstan, was an Australian illustrator, cartoonist and caricaturist. As an illustrator, Dunstan was most active from the early 1900s to 1914, contributing cartoons and caricatures to a number of Sydney-based illustrated journals during that period. His comic strips, 'Dear Little Willie' for The Sunday Times in 1909 and 'The Adventures of William Mug' for The International Socialist during 1913 and 1914, are considered to be important early examples of the comic strip format in Australia.

Zif Dunstan also worked as a journalist and a vaudeville performer, with a music hall act combining comedy and "rapid sketch work". He became a committed socialist who worked for unionist causes during the 1920s.

== Biography ==
=== Early life ===
George Edward Dunstan was born in Daylesford, Victoria, on 13 August 1876, the son of Alfred Dunstan and Emma (née Henshaw). In an interview in 1913, Dunstan categorised his early years at Daylesford as a "pretty hard struggle for existence", working in a number of different capacities: "Grocer's boy, bookseller, messenger for a florist, harness maker, office boy for a builder, house painter, and bootmaker". He recalled having "a very imaginative mind" and was "always drawing pictures, generally gruesome studies of railway accidents". At school he drew caricatures of his fellow schoolboys and teachers, but once "got caught in the act of drawing the head master" with painful results.

=== Melbourne ===
In about 1893, aged sixteen, Dunstan moved to Melbourne and made a living from house painting.

In the latter half of 1898, the imaginary and fanciful writings of Louis de Rougemont, about his exploits in New Guinea and Australia, were receiving widespread newspaper coverage in Australia. Dunstan drew three "purely imaginative" cartoons of the Swiss fantasist and managed to sell them to the editor of Melbourne's The Leader newspaper. The three drawings, signed "G.D.", were published in the issue of 15 October 1898 (his first published drawings). Dunstan later claimed the editor assured him that he would buy subsequent "topical sketches" each week from him. He produced a "page cartoon of incidents at the Caulfield Cup" which he delivered to the newspaper office. However, his "sketch did not appear, or any further efforts on my part".

After this setback, Dunstan determined to be an artist and decided to go to Sydney. Carrying his swag and belongings he walked from Melbourne to Albury, taking farm jobs along the way. At Albury he managed to "jump the rattler", riding the train to Sydney without buying a ticket.

=== Sydney ===
In Sydney Dunstan earned a living doing poster work, including a short stint with a touring theatrical company doing advance work such as arranging board for the actors, advertising and posters. After his experience with the theatrical company, Dunstan returned to Sydney and undertook a number of different jobs to make his living: "commercial drawing, designing daybills and posters, cutting out linoleum blocks and writing".

In February 1899, Dunstan sold an illustration to John Norton's Truth newspaper, featuring a caricature of George Reid, then premier of New South Wales. The cartoon was signed "G.D.". The next time he was published in Truth was on 30 September 1900, a satirical cartoon depicting visitors to The Domain and signed "Zif" (a signature he invariably used thereafter).

George Dunstan and Alice Colliver were married in 1900 in Sydney. The couple initially resided at 93 Kippax Street in Surry Hills. By 1904 the family was living in a narrow workers' terrace at 28 Morehead Street in Redfern. The couple had four children, three daughters and a son, born from 1901 to 1911.^{[A]}

Norton launched his Sydney Sportsman newspaper in October 1900. From about June 1901, Dunstan's caricatures and cartoons began to be occasionally published in the journal, an early example being a caricature of George, a stalwart employee of Tattersall's Club. An illustration by Dunstan was used for the cover of Jury magazine for its issue of 12 April 1902. The image was a parody of the well-known 'You Dirty Boy' Pears' Soap advertisement. Dunstan depicted the woman, labelled 'Public Opinion', washing the boy (labelled 'John Norton') with disinfectant. In September 1902, Dunstan had another of his caricatures published in Sydney's The Newsletter.

In early February 1903, 'Zif', described as "the lightning sketcher", made his debut as one of the variety entertainers to perform at the weekly Sunday concert series at the Golden Gate Hall. In March 1903, it was reported that Dunstan and his wife Alice had been "doing a neat little sketch at some of the music halls", adding that "his rapid sketch work and his wife's sweet singing have won for them a gratifying amount of success".

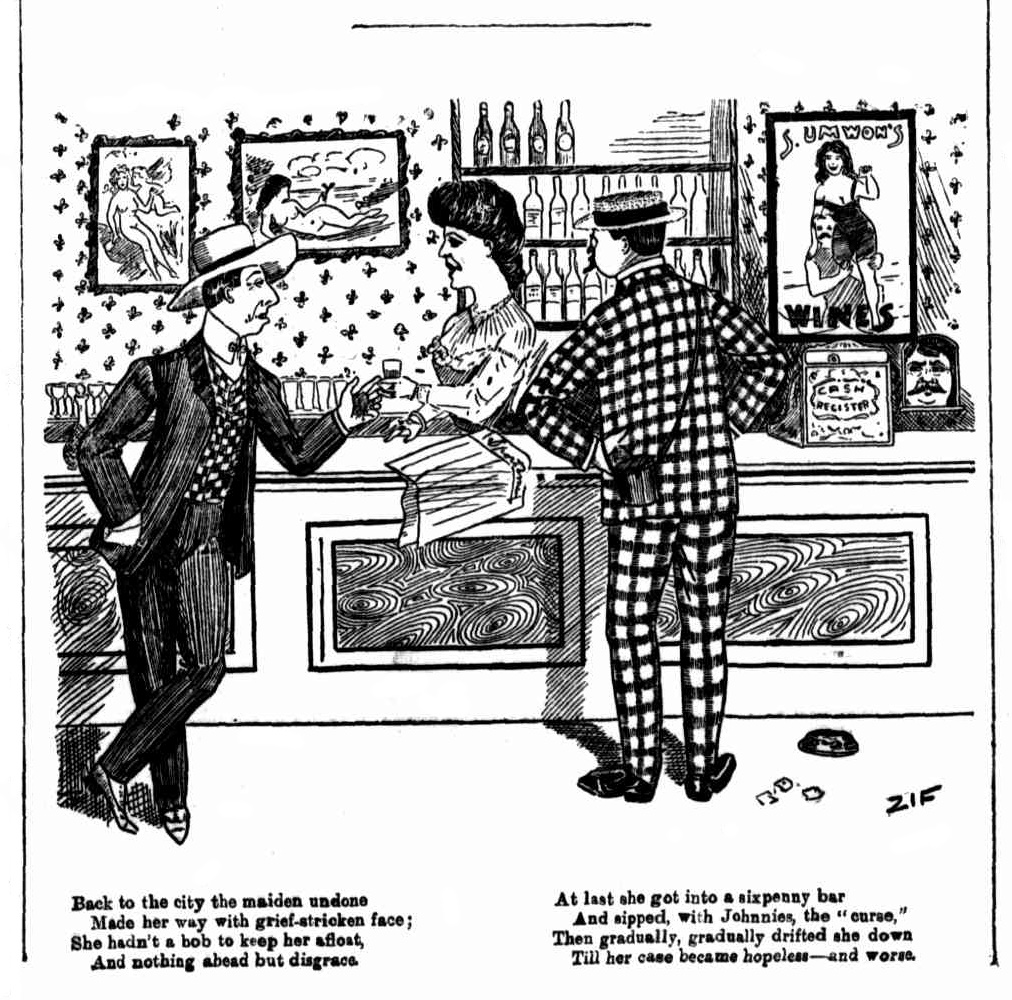
Panel 3 of 'A Prostitute's Progress: From Country Home to Chinese Hovel', published in Truth newspaper, 18 December 1904.

In December 1904, Truth newspaper published six sequential illustrations by Dunstan (each with accompanying verse), titled 'The Prostitute's Progress: From Country Home to Chinese Hovel'. His illustrations were an obvious reference to Hogarth's influential 'A Harlot's Progress'. The subject of Dunstan's morality tale is a "virtuous girl" from the bush who comes to the city and accepts the gift of "a nice frock" from "the tempter"; in the final panel, in a Chinese opium den, "her mis'ry was ended by Death".

In about 1905, Dunstan produced a set of colour postcards named 'In Borrowed Plumes', with themes of political satire, that were published by the NSW Bookstall Company. One example is a caricature of Sir Harry Rawson, Governor of New South Wales, labelled "Sir Harry Rawson in Swagmans Attire". Other postcards in the set depicted Alfred Deakin in a "Prehistoric Silver Tongued Orators' Costume" and George Reid as a knight in armour in "George Lauri's 'Orchid' Costume".

Dunstan also began to sell cartoons to other illustrated newspapers, increasingly so from about 1905 onwards. He contributed theatrical caricatures and cartoons to The Bulletin and may have written theatre reviews for the magazine as well. His cartoons were occasionally published in The Arrow.

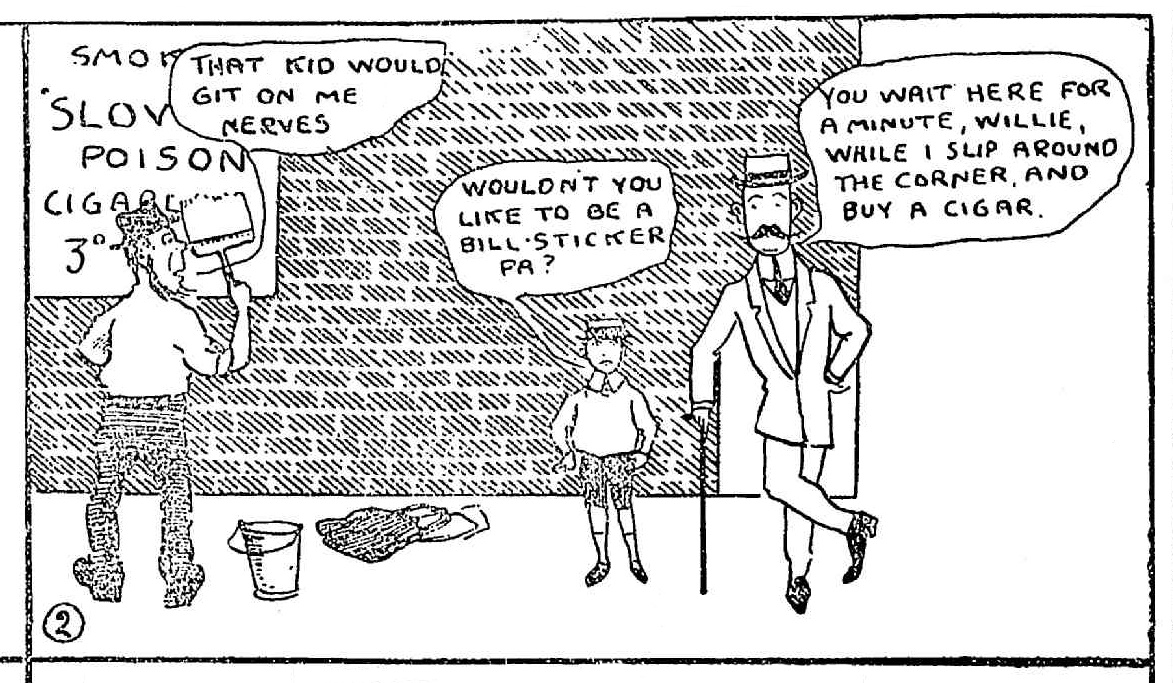
A panel from the comic strip 'Dear Little Willie', published in Sunday Times (Sydney), 6 June 1909.

In about January 1908, Dunstan toured Tasmania with his "lightning sketch" act. In February 1908, he performed his "lightning-sketch turn" as part of a variety programme at Sydney's National Amphitheatre. In April 1908, Dunstan was appointed secretary of the Australian Vaudeville Association.^{[B]}

In 1909 Dunstan was one of three cartoonists, along with Charles Henry Hunt and Hugh Maclean, producing comic strips for Sydney's weekly Sunday Times newspaper (magazine section: 'For Boys and Girls'). Dunstan's comic strip 'Dear Little Willie', about a boy who asks lots of questions, was published over three weeks from 23 May to 6 June 1909.

Dunstan's cartoons and caricatures were occasionally published in the Sydney Sportsman from 1905 to 1910, but during the first half of 1911 until the end of May, they became a regular feature of the weekly newspaper.

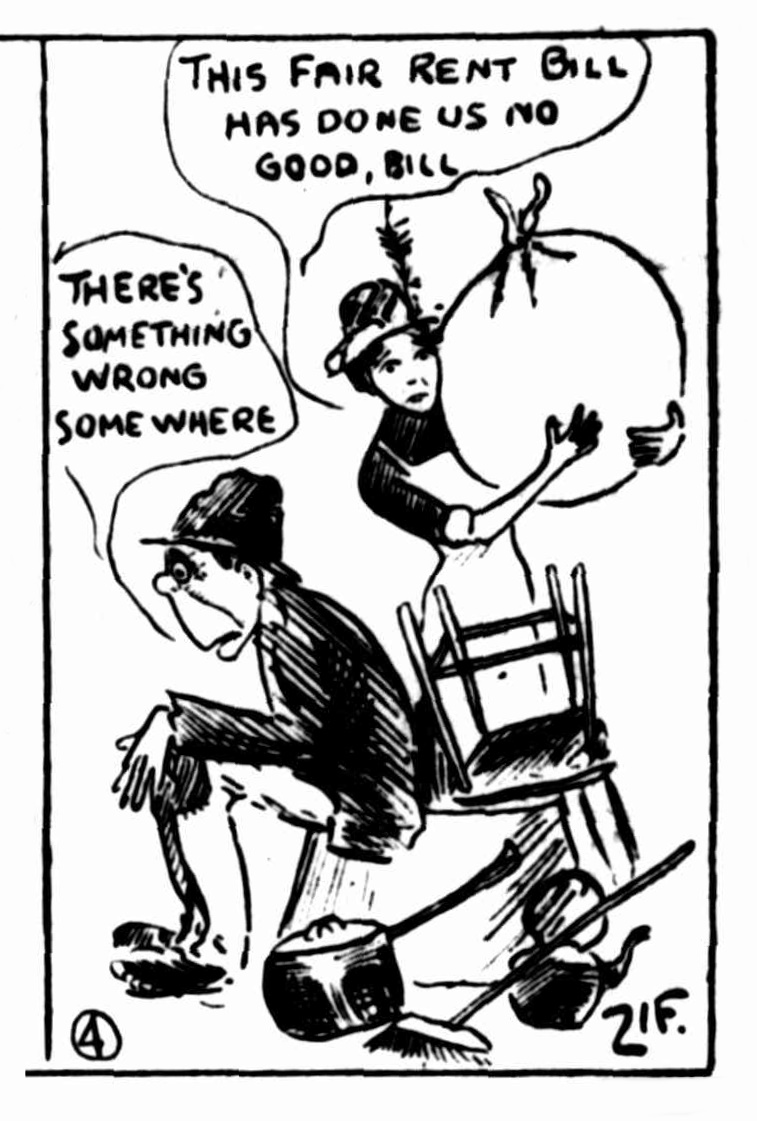
A panel from 'The Adventures of William Mug', published in The International Socialist, 23 August 1913.

By January 1912, Dunstan had begun contributing cartoons and illustrations to The International Socialist newspaper. In 1912 Dunstan contributed a full page illustration for a sixteen-page pamphlet by H. E. Holland titled The Crime of Conscription. Dunstan's 'The Seven Ages of a Conscript' (with verse "by W.R.W.") was made up of seven panels, the first depicting the conscript as an infant ("List'ning intently to old soldier's tales") and the last showing a one-legged returned soldier watching a wealthy businessman drive past in his chauffeur-driven car.

By 1913 Zif Dunstan's cartoons were more frequently published in the pages of The International Socialist. His comic strip 'The Adventures of William Mug' appeared on a semi-regular basis in the newspaper from 19 July 1913 until 26 September 1914. The character 'William Mug' represented the average working man, abused and down-trodden but unable to recognise the virtues of socialism. Dunstan's 'William Mug' comic strip directed its derision at politicians, big business, conscription, landlords, royalty, the police, the judiciary and snobbish class values, encounters with which the clueless protagonist would proclaim "there's something wrong somewhere". Dunstan's 'everyman' character began to also appear in individual cartoons.

In September 1913, Dunstan departed for New Zealand to perform as a "comedy cartoonist" on the Fuller-Brennan vaudeville circuit.

During this period in his life, Zif Dunstan was a committed socialist. By about 1914, his marriage had broken down, with Zif and Alice going their separate ways. In November 1914, a warrant was issued for Dunstan's arrest, "charged with wife desertion", the complainant being Alice Dunstan of 32 Grose Street in Camperdown. He was described as " sketch artist, recently employed at Zaroks Picture Show, Enmore", with a physical description of being "36 years of age, 5 feet 9 inches high, medium build, dark complexion and hair, clean shaven, blue eyes".

=== Cessnock ===
From about 1920, Dunstan resided alone in "a two-roomed shack" in Cessnock, where he worked as a sign-painter.

In the early 1920s, Dunstan contributed cartoons and a comic strip called 'Bill Mug' to Common Cause, the journal of the Australian Coal and Shale Employees' Federation. He was initially given "practically an open go as regards choice of subjects for cartoons", but in 1923 after Samuel Rosa took over as editor, Dunstan's cartoons were subjected to restrictions in regard to language and he was "also warned against saying anything in favor of Communism, though I might say a word or so for Socialism". Dunstan wrote in 1924 that he "did not know the difference between Communism and Socialism". He helped to advance the causes he espoused by painting trade union banners.

In February 1924, a production of the pantomime The Babes in the Wood performed by local children was held on two nights in the Lyceum Hall at Cessnock. The production was under he direction of Dunstan and William Taylor and the pantomime featured "special scenery" painted by Dunstan. The proceeds from the performances were in aid of the Cessnock District Hospital.

In November 1924, a police constable attended a fire at Dunstan's residence in Cessnock, at the rear of Clayton's shop in Vincent Street. After the fire was extinguished, the policeman searched through the debris "and found a number of obscene pictures". A few days later, he spoke to Dunstan and told him about the "indecent pictures" he had recovered. Dunstan explained that "most artists during their career have an inclination to sketch these kinds of pictures", but denied he had produced them for sale. In January Dunstan appeared before the Police Magistrate at the Cessnock Police Court, charged with "having certain improper publications in his possession... for the purpose of sale". After the hearing of evidence, the case was dismissed.

In May 1925, it was reported that Dunstan had "fitted up" a four-wheeled caravan, to be drawn by a pair of horses and furnished with sleeping accommodation, cupboards and shelves "which convert the vehicle into a cosy and comfortable cabin". Dunstan announced that he intended to leave Cessnock "for a tour of other parts of the State and carry on his business as a sign-writer and decorative painter in the towns he proposes to visit".

In August 1925, a 'Missing Friends' notice from Dunstan's daughter Emma was published in the New South Wales Police Gazette, seeking to trace the whereabouts of her father (described as "6 feet high, big strong build, medium complexion, black hair going grey, grey eyes, clean shaven"). He was described as "a travelling sign-writer... last heard of some years ago at Cessnock".

=== Last years ===
By 1934, Dunstan was living in the suburb of Fitzroy in Melbourne.

Prior to his death in 1946, Dunstan was living at 40 Gore Street in Fitzroy, with a woman named Marjory (recorded as his wife).^{[C]}

George Edward ('Zif') Dunstan died on 21 August 1946 at his home in Gore Street, Fitzroy, aged 70.

== Legacy ==
The comic strip historian Nat Karmichael has written that although Zif Dunstan's illustrations appear crude by contemporary standards, "he was a pioneer in the development of the comic strip format" in Australia. At such an early period in the evolution of newspaper comic strips, Dunstan's intuitive understanding of the medium and his use of continuing characters, speech balloons and action lines enabled an effective progression of the narrative to make his point. Karmichael has noted: "Many of the comic artists who followed him, though infinitely superior draftsmen, never achieved Dunstan’s basic understanding of the medium" and makes the additional point that due to the limited circulation and "singular point of view" of The International Socialist newspaper, "Zif Dunstan’s contribution to the field has remained unrecognized".

== Gallery ==
A selection of images by Zif Dunstan
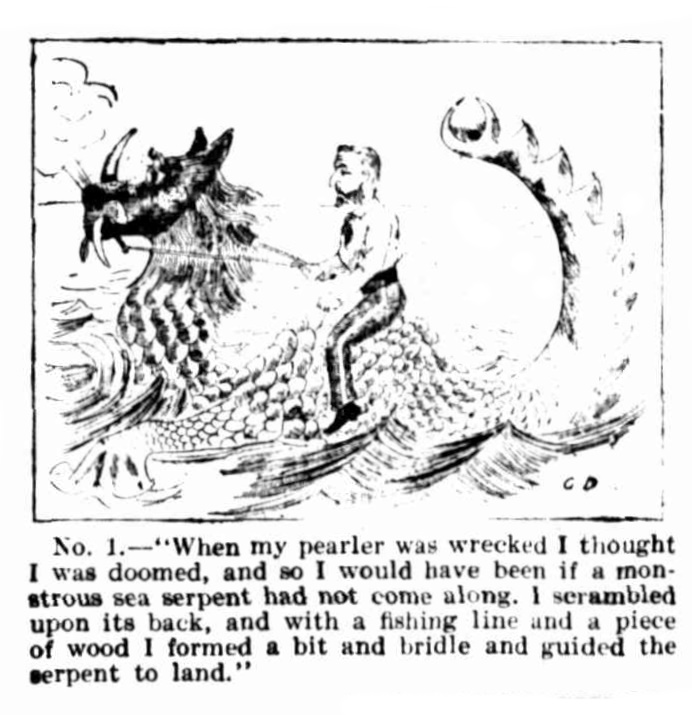
Panel One of 'The Astonishing and Unveracious Adventures of Louis de Rougemont', published in The Leader (Melbourne), 15 October 1898.

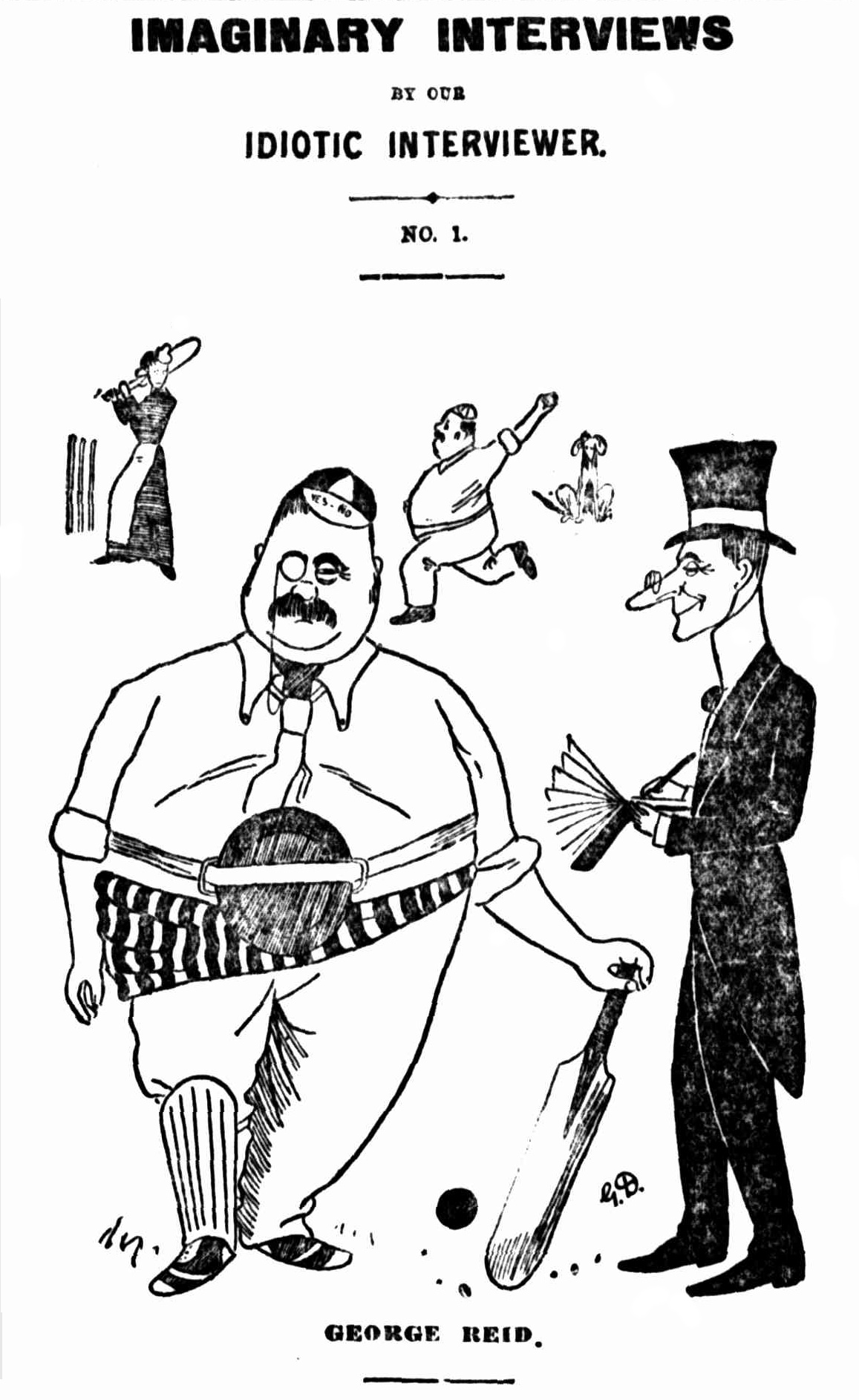
Caricature of George Reid, published in Truth (Sydney), 19 February 1899.

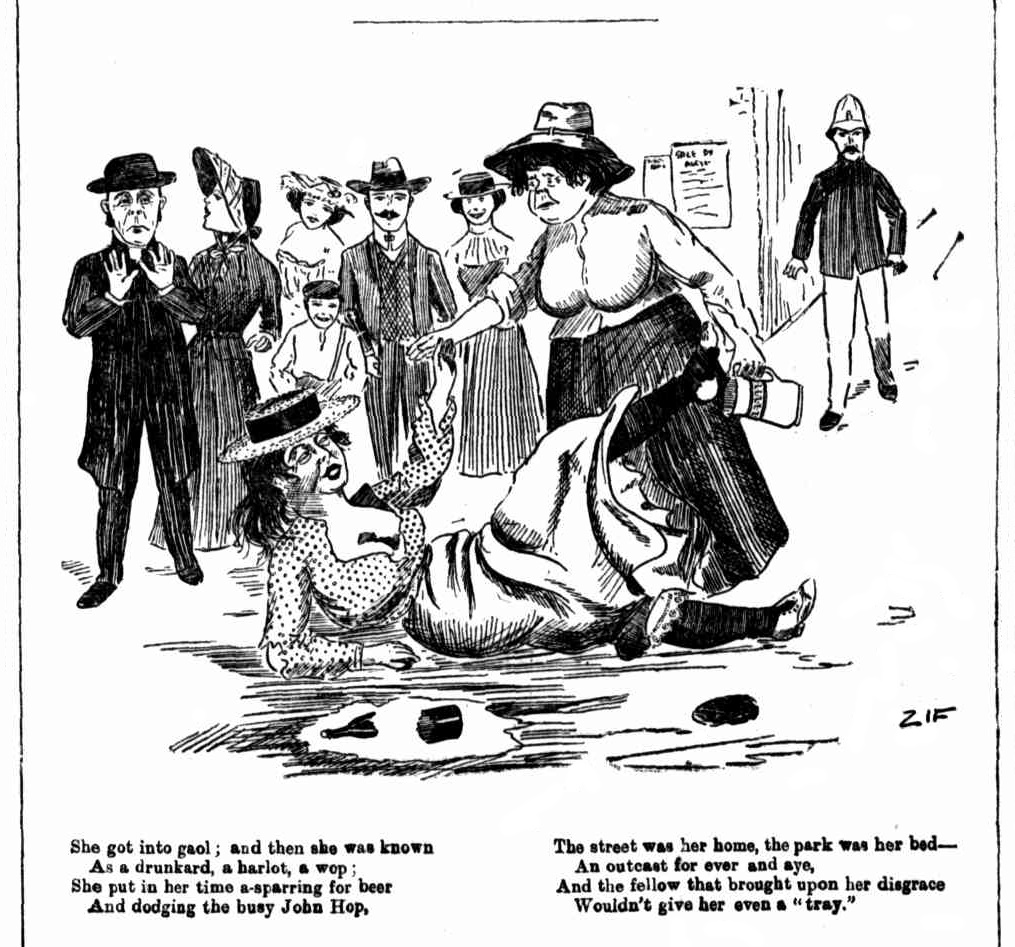
Panel 5 of 'A Prostitute's Progress: From Country Home to Chinese Hovel', published in Truth newspaper, 18 December 1904.

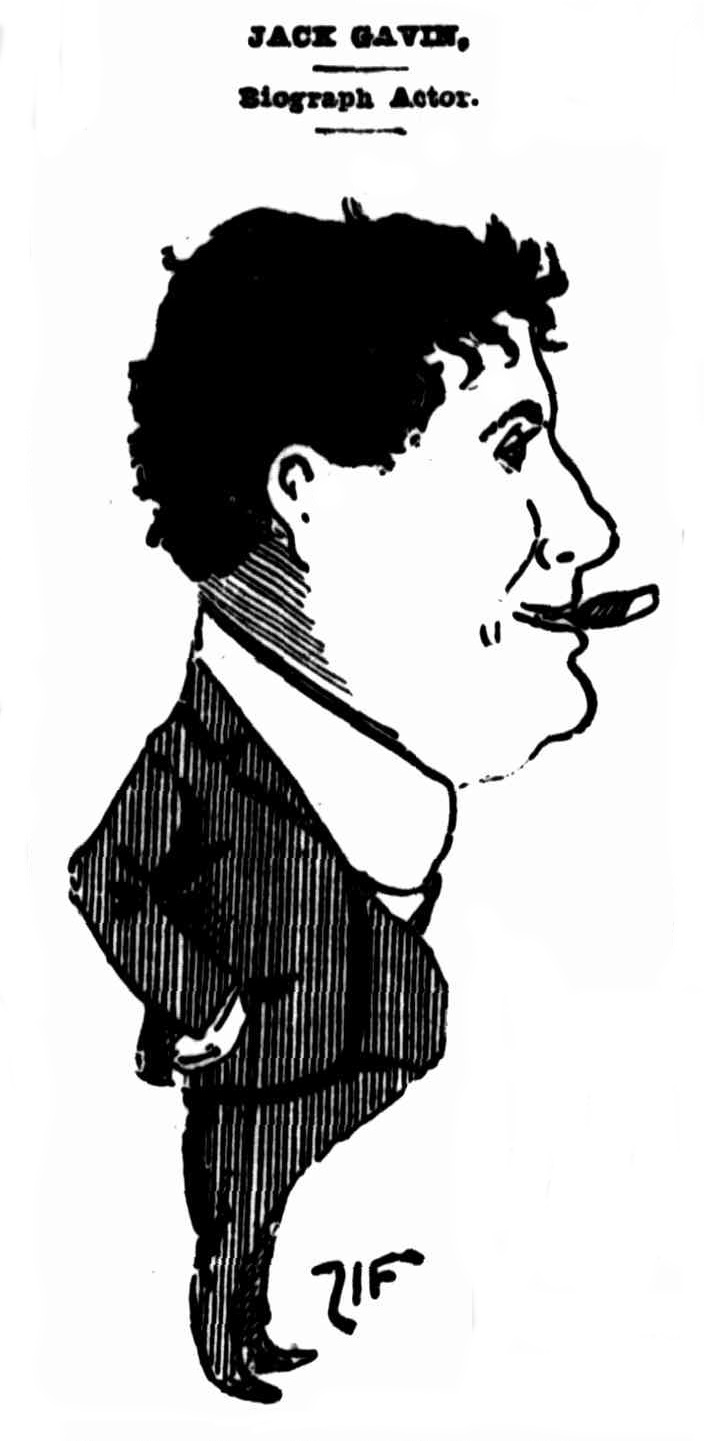
Caricature of Jack Gavin, film director and actor, published in Sydney Sportsman, 8 February 1911.

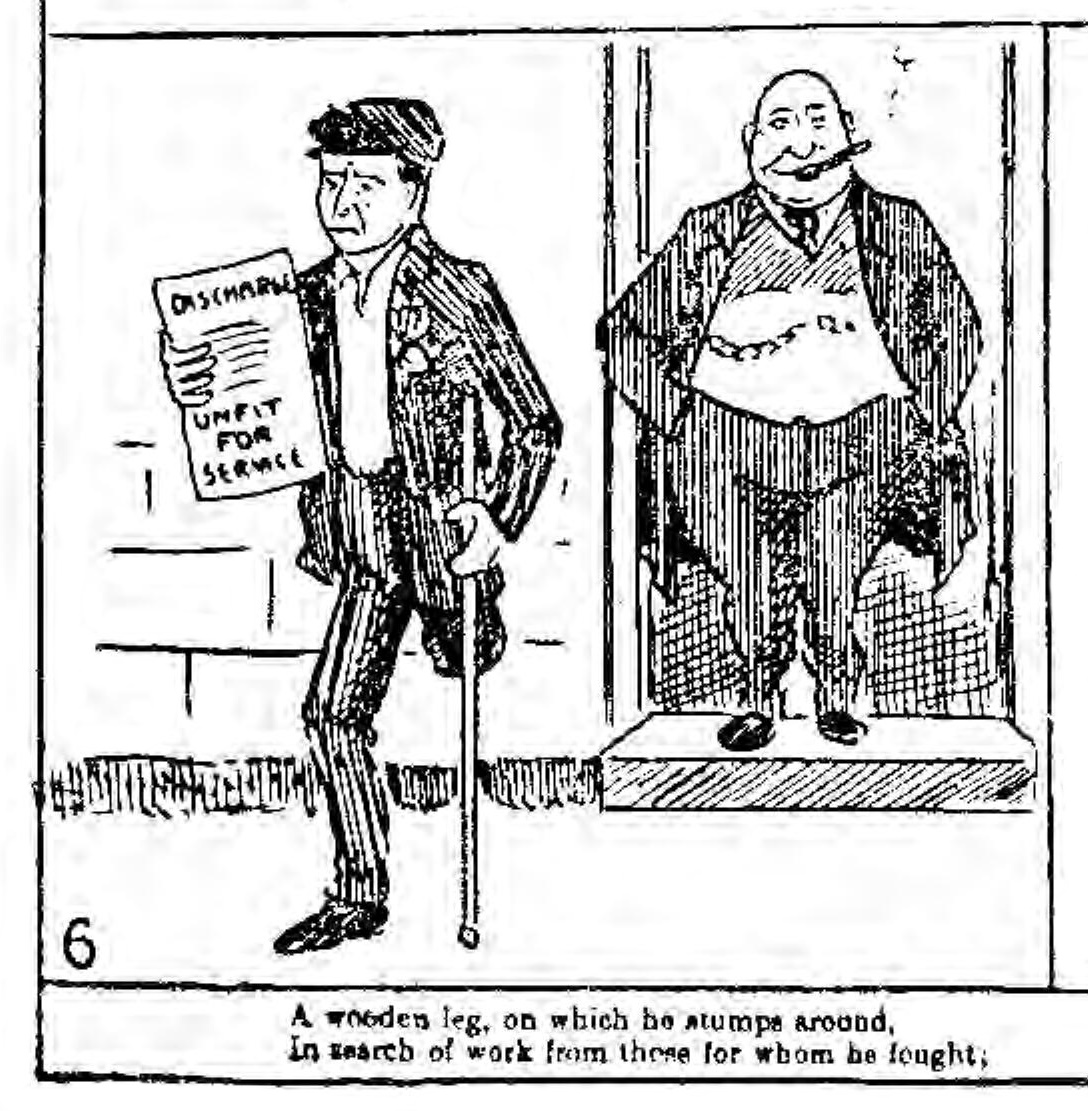
Panel 6 of 'The Seven Ages of a Conscript', published in The Crime of Conscription (1912) by H. E. Holland ("a wooden leg, on which he stumps around, In search of work from those for whom he fought")

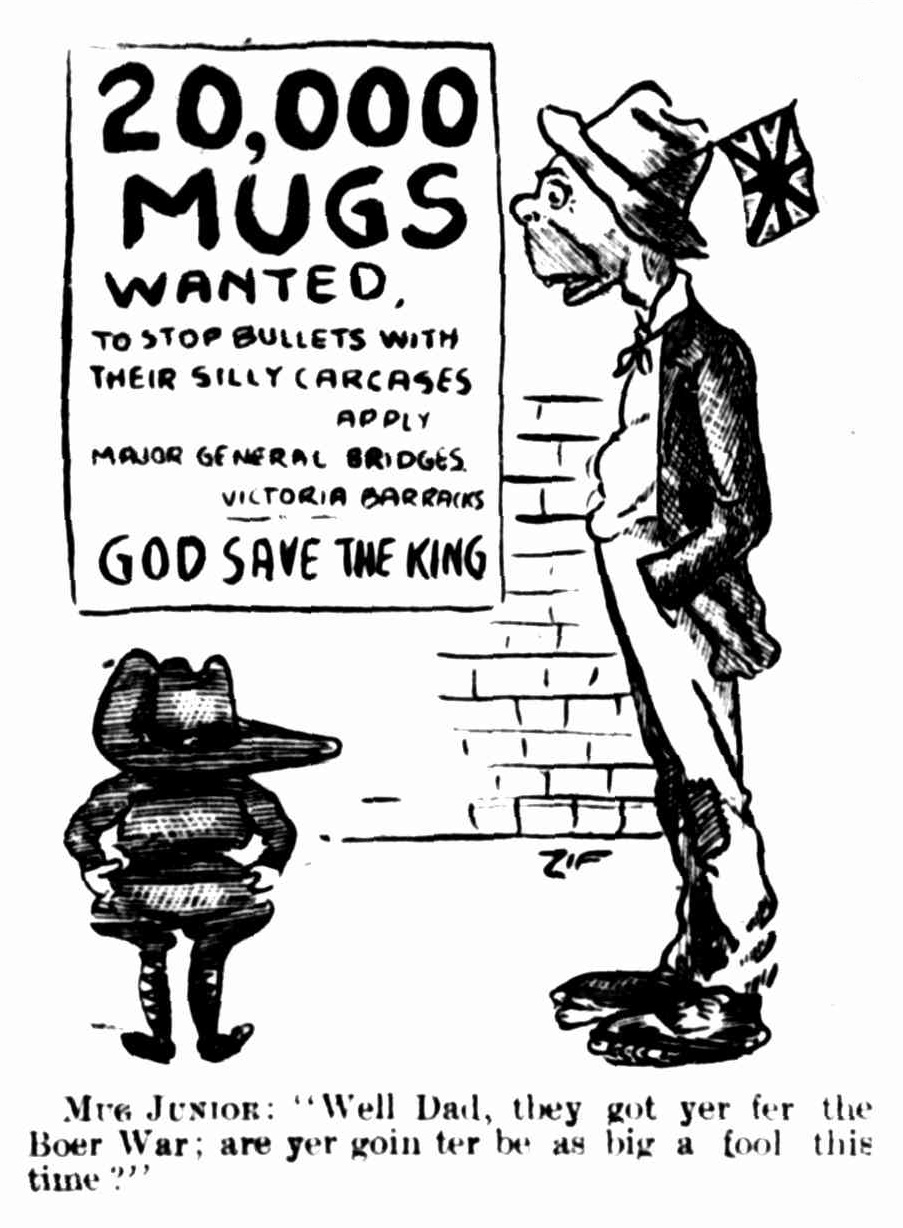
'20,000 Mugs Wanted', published in The International Socialist, 22 August 1914.

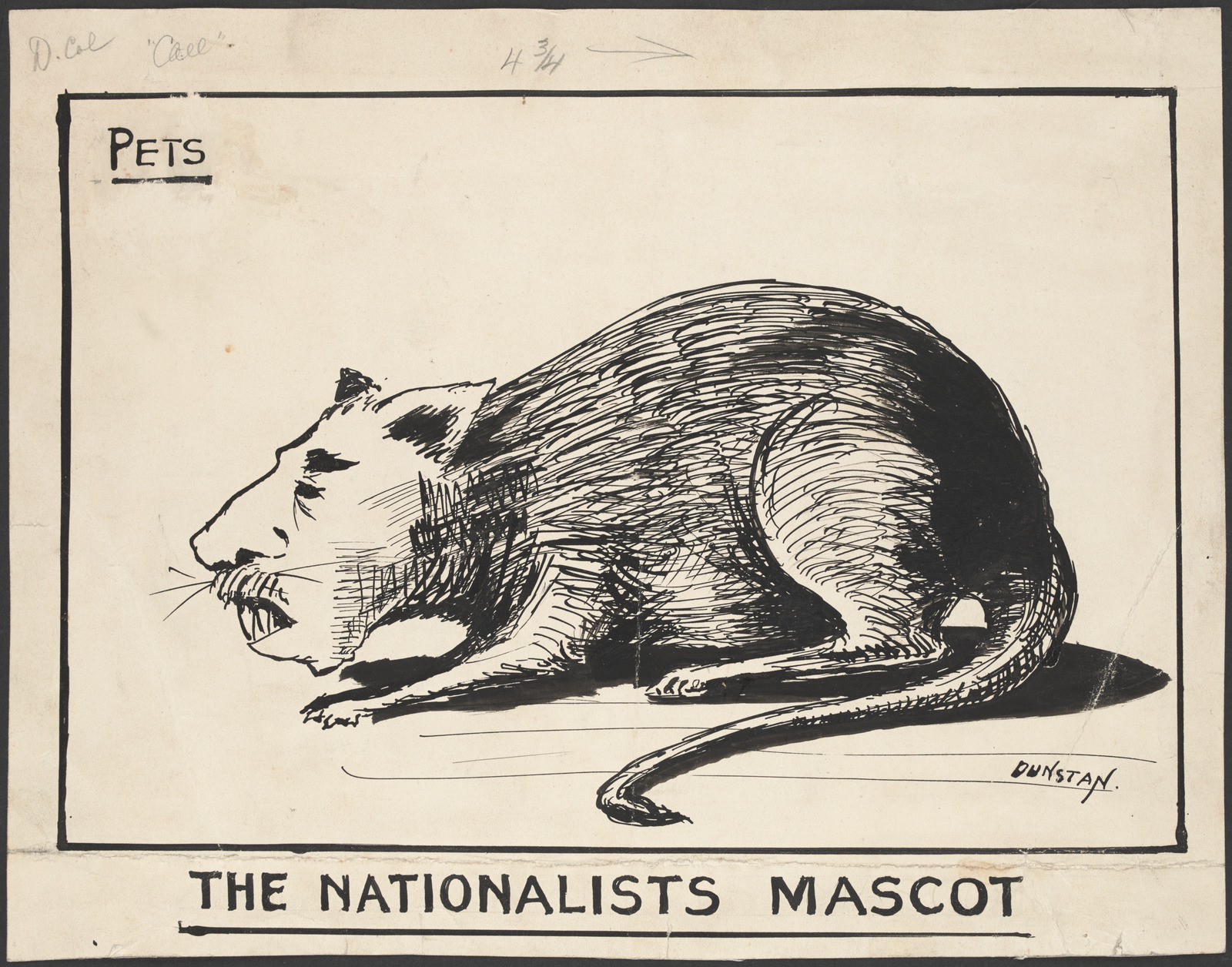
'The Nationalists' Mascot', depicting Billy Hughes as a rat (artwork; image published in Melbourne's Labor Call newspaper, 27 November 1919).

== Notes ==
A. Alice Lydia Colliver was born on 20 April 1879 in Melbourne, the daughter of Thomas Colliver and Sarah Jane (née Wolledge). Prior to her marriage to George Dunstan, Alice was an actress from Melbourne, performing in John Fuller's vaudeville circuit. George and Alice Dunstan had four children: Sarah, born on 6 January 1901 in Sydney; Renée, born in 1902; Emma, born in 1906; George Zif, born in 1911. In 1916 Alice gave birth to a daughter named Alice Graham Dunstan, born at Petersham. The birth registration had no record of the father's name (but it is likely the father was Robert William Graham).

B. The February 1908 article in The Worker stated that Zif Dunstan was "the third Australian black-and-white artist to take to the variety stage". The others were "'Cruikshank' Laing and Bert Levy, now respectively in England and America".

C. Marjory Dunstan (née Webster) died on 12 September 1954 in Melbourne, aged 74.
