= 1870s in anthropology =

- 1870s in anthropology
- 1880s
Other topics in 1870s:
- Fashion
- Music
- Sociology

Timeline of anthropology, 1870–1879

== Events ==
1873

- The American Museum of Natural History establishes an anthropology department

== Publications ==
1871

- Systems of Consanguinity and Affinity of the Human Family

== Births ==
1873

- Leo Frobenius
- Arnold van Gennep
- Charles Seligman
- John Reed Swanton

== Deaths ==
1873

- Louis Agassiz
