= 1890s in sociology =

- 1880s
- 1890s in sociology
- 1900s
Other topics in 1890s:
- Anthropology
- Comics
- Fashion

The following events related to sociology occurred in the 1890s.

== 1890 ==
- Sir James George Frazer's The Golden Bough is published.
- Alfred Marshall's Principles of Economics is published.
- Jose Rizal's La Indolencia de los Filipinos is published in Madrid.
- Georg Simmel's Social Differentiation is published.
- Gabriel Tarde's Laws of Imitation is published.
- Frank Wilson Blackmar starts teaching Elements of Sociology to graduate students at the University of Kansas, Lawrence. This becomes the oldest continuing sociology course in America

=== Births ===
- March 8: Oswald von Nell-Breuning

== 1891 ==
- The Department of History and Sociology is established at the University of Kansas
- Beatrice Webb's Co-operative Movement is published.
- Edward Alexander Westermarck's The History of Human Marriage is published.

== 1892 ==
- Albion Small establishes the 1st Department of Sociology The Chicago School of Sociology.
- Charlotte Perkins Gilman's The Yellow Wallpaper is published.
- Georg Simmel's Problems of the Philosophy of History is published.

== 1893 ==
- Émile Durkheim's The Division of Labour in Society is published.
- Leonard Trelawny Hobhouse's The Labour Movement is published.
- The final volume of Karl Marx's Capital is published (edited by Engels).
- Georg Simmel's Introduction to the Science of Ethics is published.
- Wilhelm Windelband's A History of Philosophy is published.
- Rene Worms founded the small Institut International de Sociologie

== 1894 ==
- Albion Woodbury Small writes the 1st textbook in Sociology: An introduction to the study of the society
- W. E. B. Du Bois' The Philadelphia Negro is published.

== 1895 ==
- Émile Durkheim's On the Normality of Crime is published.
- Émile Durkheim's The Rules of the Sociological Method is published.
- The first publication of The American Journal of Sociology by The University of Chicago Press

== 1896 ==
- Henri Bergson's Matter and Memory is published.
- Franklin Henry Giddings' Principles of Sociology is published.
- Gaetano Mosca's The Ruling Class is published.
- Rene Worms' The Nature and Method of Sociology is published.

== 1897 ==
- W. E. B. Du Bois' The Souls of Black Folk is published.
- Émile Durkheim's Suicide is published.
- Vilfredo Pareto's The New Theories of Economics is published.
- The First publication of L'Année Sociologique.

=== Births ===
- May 22: Stanislaw Ossowski
- June 22: Norbert Elias
- August 28: Louis Wirth

== 1898 ==
- Franklin Henry Giddings' Elements of Sociology is published.
- Gabriel Tarde's Social Laws: An Outline of Sociology is published.
- Charlotte Perkins Gilman's Women and Economics is published.

== 1899 ==
- Karl Kautsky's On The Agrarian Question is published.
- Vladimir Ilyich Ulyanov Lenin's The Development of Capitalism in Russia is published.
- Thorstein Bunde Veblen's of The Theory of the Leisure Class is published.
