= 1910s in anthropology =

- 1900s
- 1910s in anthropology
- 1920s
Other topics in 1910s:
- Comics
- Fashion
- Science and technology
- Sociology

Timeline of anthropology, 1910–1919

== Events ==
1911

- Ishi is 'discovered' and taken to the Museum of Anthropology at the University of California, San Francisco

1915

- Bronislaw Malinowski began his studies in the Trobriand Islands

== Births ==
1911

- Weston La Barre
- Louis Dumont
- Johannes Falkenberg
- Max Gluckman

1914

- Thor Heyerdahl
- Oscar Lewis
- Marvin Opler

1915

- John W. Bennett
- Robert Heizer
- Elman Service

1916

- Edward Dozier
- Michel Foucault
- Derek Freeman
- M N Srinivas

1918

- John Arundel Barnes
- Ray Birdwhistell
- James Clyde Mitchell
- David Schneider

== Deaths ==
1914

- Adolph Bandelier
- Alexander Francis Chamberlain

1915

- Frederic Ward Putnam

1916

- Ishi

1918

- Herman Karl Haberlin
