= 1900s in sociology =

- 1890s
- 1900s in sociology
- 1910s
Other topics in 1900s:
- Anthropology
- Comics
- Fashion
- Science and technology
- Television

The following events related to sociology occurred in the 1900s (decade).

== 1900 ==
- Sigmund Freud's The Interpretation of Dreams is published.
- Georg Simmel's The Philosophy of Money is published.

== 1901 ==
- Benjamin Seebohm Rowntree's Poverty, A Study of Town Life is published.

=== Births ===
- February 13: Paul Lazarsfeld
- April 13: Jacques Lacan
- June 16: Henri Lefebvre
- December 16: Margaret Mead

== 1902 ==
- Charles Horton Cooley's Human Nature and the Social Order is published.
- Vladimir Ilyich Ulyanov Lenin's What is to be Done? is published.
- Werner Sombart's Der moderne Kapitalismus is published
- Lester Frank Ward's Dynamic Sociology is published.
- Beatrice Webb's and Sidney Webb's Problems of Modern Industry is published.

== 1903 ==
- Victor Branford's On the origin and use of the word Sociology and on the relation of sociological to other studies and to practical problems is published.
- Charles Booth's Life and Labour of the People of London is published.
- W. E. B. Du Bois' The Souls of Black Folk is published.
- Émile Durkheim's and Marcel Mauss' Primitive Classification is published.
- Charlotte Perkins Gilman's The Home: Its Work and Influences is published.
- Georg Simmel's The Metropolis and Mental Life is published.
- Lester Frank Ward's Pure Sociology is published.

== 1904 ==
- Leonard Trelawny Hobhouse's Democracy and Reaction is published.
- Thorstein Bunde Veblen's The Theory of Business Enterprise is published.
- British Sociological Society is founded, James Bryce is elected first president.

== 1905 ==
- Jane Addams's An International Patriotism is published.
- Georg Simmel's Philosophy of Fashion is published.
- Max Weber's The Protestant Ethic and the Spirit of Capitalism is published.
- The American Sociological Society is founded; this is later renamed the American Sociological Association.
- The School of Sociology set up by the Charity Organisation Society for the training of Social Workers.

== 1906 ==
- Werner Sombart's Why is there no Socialism in the United States? is published.
- William Graham Sumner's Folkways is published.
- Lester Frank Ward's Applied Sociology is published.

== 1907 ==
- Henri Bergson's Creative Evolution is published.
- Albion Small's General Sociology is published.
- Albion Small's Adam Smith and Modern Sociology is published.
- H. G. Wells' The So-Called Science of Society is published.
- Chair of Sociology at the London School of Economics founded, the first in the United Kingdom, and is taken by Leonard Trelawny Hobhouse.

== 1908 ==
- Friedrich Nietzsche's Ecce Homo is published.
- Georg Simmel's Sociology: Investigations on the Forms of Sociation (including "The Dyad" and "The Stranger") is published.
- Georges Sorel's Reflections on Violence is published.
- Georges Sorel's The Illusions of Progress is published.

== 1909 ==
- Charles Cooley's Social Organization is published.
- Mary Coolidge's Chinese Immigrants is published.
- Charles Arnold van Gennep's Rites of Passage is published.
- Maurice Halbwach's Thèse de Droit is published.
- Leonard Trelawny Hobhouse's The Origin and Development of Moral Ideas is published.
- Karl Kautsky's Road to Power is published.
- W. I. Thomas' Source Book of Social Origins is published.
- The German Society for Sociology Is Founded by Max Weber, Georg Simmel and Ferdinand Tönnies among others, Tonnies serves as first president.

=== Deaths ===
- August 19: Ludwig Gumplowicz
