= 1870s in sociology =

- 1860s
- 1870s in sociology
- 1880s
Other topics in 1870s:
- Anthropology
- Fashion
- Music

The following events related to sociology occurred in the 1870s.

== 1871 ==
- Pierre Guillaume Frédéric le Play's Le Organisation de Famille is published.
- Carl Menger's Principles of Economics is published.
- Lewis Henry Morgan's Systems of Consanguinity and Affinity of the Human Family is published.
- Sir Edward Burnett Tylor's In Primitive Culture is published.

== 1873 ==
- Herbert Spencer's The Study of Sociology is published.

== 1874 ==
- Francis Galton's English men of science : their nature and nurture is published.
- Pierre Guillaume Frédéric Le Play's La réforme sociale en France déduite de l’observation comparée des peuples Européens is published.
- Henry Sidgwick's The Method of Ethics is published.

== 1875 ==
- Francis Galton's Statistics by intercomparison, with remarks on the law of frequency of error is published.
- Frederic Harrison's Order and Progress is published.

== 1878 ==
- Friedrich Engels' Anti-Dühring is published.

== 1879 ==
- Henry George's, Progress and Poverty is published.
