= Journal of Current Pictorial =

時事畫報
- Genre: Political
- Author: Tongmenghui
- Original run: 1905–1913

The Journal of Current Pictorial (Chinese: 時事畫報) was a manhua magazine published in 1905. It was authored and drawn by members of the Tongmenghui. The magazine was banned by the Qing dynasty in 1909. Subsequently, few years after the censorship, the Qing was overthrown in 1911 under the Xinhai Revolution.

== History ==
The purpose of the publication was aimed at informing the general public of events and politics in China. It was released three times a month. The artists Pan Da-wei (潘達微), Gao Jian-Fu (高劍父), Xie Ying-bo (謝英伯), He Jian-shi (何劍士) and Zheng Nu-quan (鄭磊泉) belonged to the revolutionary Tongmenghui.

The work criticized Chinese feudal society along with exposing the corruption and weaknesses of the Qing government. The magazine was banned in 1909 in China, when it was believed to be spreading anti-Qing propaganda. After the ban, the publication resumed temporarily in Hong Kong for a few months the following year. The Qing government later successfully pressured the British Colonial government to also ban the magazine in Hong Kong.

In 1912, a few months after Republic of China established, the pictorial was resumed publication in Guangzhou. However, it was ended by a turmoil a year later.

== See also ==
- Wuchang Uprising
