= Herman Karl Haeberlin =

American-born German anthropologist

- Born: September 11, 1891; Akron, Ohio, US
- Died: February 12, 1918 (aged 26)

Academic background
- Education: Columbia University

Academic work
- Discipline: Anthropologist, linguist

Herman Karl Haeberlin (11 September 1890, in Akron, Ohio – 12 February 1918) was a German-American anthropologist and linguist, who, before his death at 26, was considered to be one of the most brilliant students of Franz Boas. His work mainly focused on the Coast Salish people and Coast Salish languages, in particular Lushootseed, Coeur d'Alène and Nuxalk.
