= F. M. Howarth =

American cartoonist

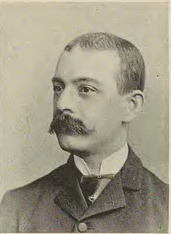
- Born: September 27, 1864
- Died: September 22, 1908 (aged 43)
- Occupation: Comics artist

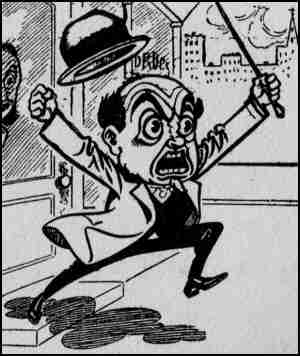
Howarth's Mr. E. Z. Mark, typical of his large-headed figures

Franklin Morris Howarth (1864–1908) was an American cartoonist and pioneering comic strip artist.

Howarth was born in Philadelphia on September 27, 1864. He was the oldest of four children of William and Sarah (Iseminger) Howarth. His father was a pattern maker and an English immigrant, his mother a native Philadelphian. Howarth attended Central High School.

By age 19 Howarth was drawing for the Philadelphia Call and other papers, after which he began to be employed by national periodicals such as Munsey's Magazine, Life, Judge, and Truth. He joined the staff of Puck in 1891, and moved to the New York World in 1901.

Howarth, whose style for figures frequently featured big heads on little bodies, was among the first generation of cartoonists to create serial cartoons, which came to be called comic strips. According to author Jared Gardner, "F. M Howarth's work is representative of the development of sequential graphic narrative during this period... Howarth fractured the single panel that had previously dominated in the United States".

Among Howarth's strips are the critically acclaimed courtship strip The Love of Lulu and Leander created in 1902 for the New York American, and eternal con-man target Mr. E. Z. Mark, created in 1903 for the American Journal-Examiner and which ran at least until his 1908 death (it might have been continued by another cartoonist). He also created the strip Ole Opey Dildock in 1907, which was taken over by W. L. Wells on Howarth's death and continued to 1914.

Howarth died September 22, 1908, in Germantown, Philadelphia, at age 43, of pneumonia.
