= 1880s in anthropology =

- 1870s
- 1880s in anthropology
- 1890s
Other topics in 1880s:
- Fashion
- Sociology

Timeline of anthropology, 1880–1889

== Events ==
1884

- Pitt Rivers Museum founded

1887

- The University of Pennsylvania Museum of Archaeology and Anthropology is founded

== Publications ==
1881

- Houses and House-life of the American Aborigines, by Lewis Henry Morgan

1887

- Totemism, by James Frazer

== Births ==
1881

- Alfred Radcliffe-Brown
- Frank Gouldsmith Speck

1883

- Paul Radin

1884

- John Peabody Harrington
- Arthur Maurice Hocart
- Bronislaw Malinowski
- Edward Sapir

1887

- Ruth Benedict
- Edward Winslow Gifford

1888

- Jaime de Angulo

== Deaths ==
1881

- John Ferguson McLennan
- Lewis Henry Morgan

1887

- Johann Bachofen

1888

- Edwin Hamilton Davis
- Henry Maine
- Nicholas Miklouho-Maclay
- Ephraim George Squier
