= Julius Stafford Baker =

English cartoonist

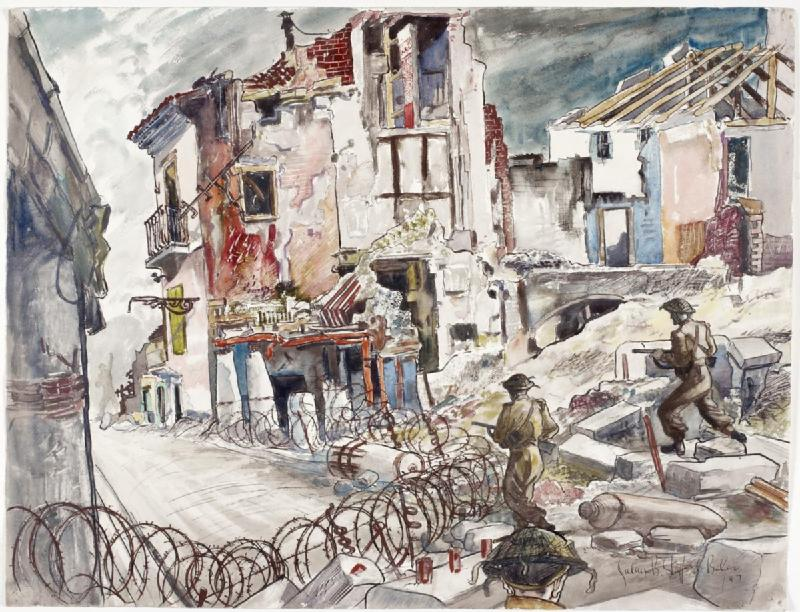
image of street fighting in Capua, River Volturno, Italy

Julius Stafford Baker (1869–1961) was an English cartoonist and creator of the series Tiger Tim. His name is sometimes given as Julius Baker, Jr or II.

== Biography ==
Born in Whitechapel, East London, Baker was the son of Julius Baker, a one-time theatrical scene painter in London who died in the Turks Islands in 1904, and a nephew of John Philip Stafford (1851–1899), an artist who also worked as a cartoonist for the magazine Funny Folks. Stafford taught the young Baker as an apprentice to draw at his studio in Fulham, and he went on to specialize in cartoons, firstly for adults and later for children. Apart from his covers for Funny Folks, in the late 19th century his work appeared regularly in Judge in the US, first under the name Frank Martin, and later signing as J.S. Baker. From 1902, Baker's Casey Court strip was a long-running success, and he became the creator of several more of the best-known children's cartoon characters of the Edwardian era, including Tiger Tim and The Bruin Boys. The Tiger Tim character was created in the 1890s as a supplement to The World and His Wife magazine and was so successful that in 1920 it gained its own children's paper, Tiger Tim's Weekly, also called The Rainbow. Tim then proved to have a sister, in the shape of Tiger Tilly, who appeared in Tiger Tilly and the Hippo Girls. However, Baker was eventually dismissed from the strip for having a style which was "too American", when it was taken over by Herbert Sydney Foxwell (1890–1943). Tiger Tim and his friends continued to appear in the weekly paper Jack and Jill from 1954 until 1985.

He was a regular exhibitor in the Royal Academy Summer Exhibitions from 1935 to about 1960.

Baker should not be confused with his son Julius Stafford-Baker (1904–1988), who became one of the later artists of the Tiger Tim comic strip and much else besides, including serving as a Second World War war artist for the Royal Air Force, or with his son, yet another Julius, who went on to found the Happy Dragons' Press. Because of the recurring name, many errors have been published.
