= 1900s in anthropology =

- 1890s
- 1900s in anthropology
- 1910s
Other topics in 1900s:
- Comics
- Fashion
- Science and technology
- Sociology
- Television

Timeline of anthropology, 1900–1909

== Events ==
1902

- The American Anthropological Association is founded

1906

- Anthropos journal founded

== Births ==
1902

- E.E. Evans-Pritchard
- Daryll Forde
- Julian Steward

1903

- Cora Du Bois
- Germaine Dieterlen
- Karl-Gustav Izikowitz
- Louis Leakey
- Siegfried Nadel

1905

- Irawati Karve
- Clyde Kluckhohn
- Ashley Montagu
- Isaac Schapera

== Deaths ==
1902

- John Wesley Powell

1905

- Adolf Bastian
- Karl Wernicke

1906

- Homer G. Barnett
- Meyer Fortes
- Gutorm Gjessing
- Willard Z. Park
