= Inquiries into Human Faculty and Its Development =

1883 book by Francis Galton

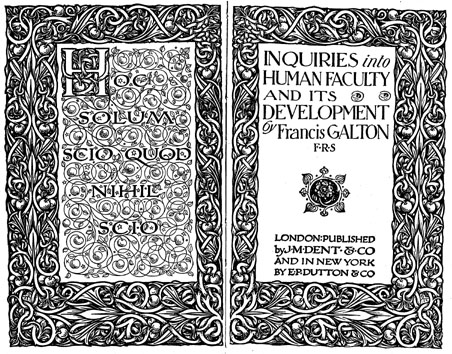
- Author: Francis Galton
- Language: English
- Publication date: 1883
- Publication place: United Kingdom

Inquiries into Human Faculty and Its Development is an 1883 book by Francis Galton, in which he covers a variety of psychological phenomena and their subsequent measurement. In this text he also references the idea of eugenics and coined the term for the first time (though he had published his ideas without the name many years earlier).
