= Sydney Sportsman =

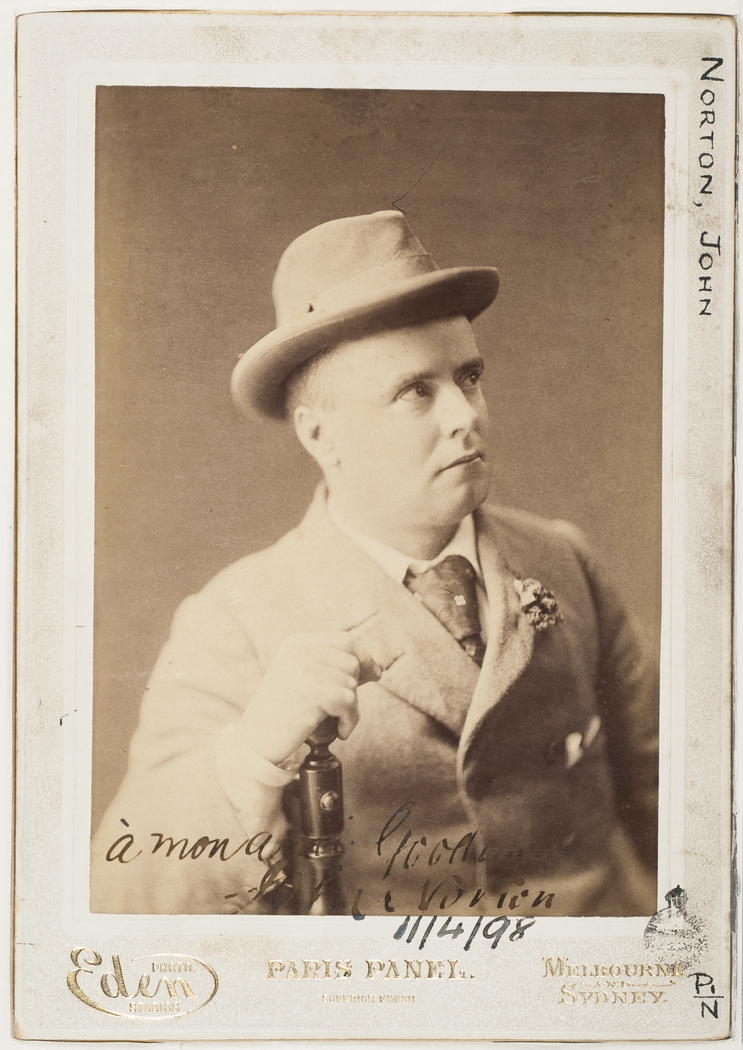
John Norton, newspaper owner

The Sydney Sportsman was a horse racing and sporting newspaper published in Sydney, Australia from 1900 to 1960. It continues to be published as The Sportsman.

== History ==
The Sydney Sportsman was first published on 3 October 1900 by John Norton. Norton was a controversial publisher who also published the Truth newspaper. He called on the writers of the Sydney Sportsman to "give it" to whoever deserved it, regardless of libel laws. The Australian poet Banjo Paterson was editor of the paper from 1921 to 1930. The paper was sold to John Fairfax and Sons in 1958.

The paper became The Sportsman in 1960 and is still in publication. It is now devoted to all forms of racing. It is currently published by Nationwide News Pty Ltd.

== Access ==
The Sydney Sportsman can be viewed at the State Library of New South Wales, and the National Library of Australia.

=== Digitisation ===
The paper has been digitised as part of the Australian Newspapers Digitisation Program project of the National Library of Australia.

== See also ==
- List of newspapers in Australia
- List of newspapers in New South Wales
