= 1860s in sociology =

- 1850s
- 1860s in sociology
- 1870s
Other topics in 1860s:
- Fashion
- Science and technology

The following events related to sociology occurred in the 1860s.

== 1860 ==
Births

- July 3: Charlotte Perkins Gilman

== 1861 ==
Events

- Sir Henry James Sumner Maine's Ancient Law is published

== 1862 ==
Events

- Lewis Morgan's The Indian Journals is published.
- Herbert Spencer's First Principles is published.

== 1864 ==
Events

- Lewis Morgan's Ancient Society is published.
- Herbert Spencer's Laws In General is published.

Births

- February 14: Robert E. Park
- March 30: Franz Oppenheimer
- April 21: Max Weber
- August 17: Charles Cooley

== 1867 ==
Events

- The First Volume of Karl Marx's Capital is published.
- The foundation of the London Positivist Society by Richard Congreve.

== 1869 ==
Events

- Francis Galton's Hereditary Genius is published.
- John Stuart Mill's The Subjection of Women is published.
