= The Philosophy of Money =

1900 book by sociologist Georg Simmel

The Philosophy of Money (1900; German: Philosophie des Geldes) is a book on economic sociology by German sociologist and social philosopher Georg Simmel. Considered to be the theorist's greatest work, Simmel's book views money as a structuring agent that helps people understand the totality of life.

== Money and value ==
Simmel believed people created value by making objects, then separating themselves from those objects and then trying to overcome that distance. He found that objects that were too close were not considered valuable and objects that were too far away for people to obtain were also not considered valuable. What was also considered in determining value was the scarcity, time, sacrifice, and difficulties involved in getting objects. In the pre-modern era, beginning with bartering, different systems of exchange for goods and services allowed for the existence of incomparable systems of value (land, food, honor, love, etc.). With the advent of a universal currency as an intermediary, these systems became reconcilable, as everything tended to become expressible in a single quantifiable metric: its monetary cost.

== Money and freedom ==
A fundamental point of The Philosophy of Money is that money brings about personal freedom. The effect of freedom can be appreciated by considering the evolution of economic obligations. When someone is a slave, their whole person is subject to the master. The peasant has more freedom, but if they are to provide the lord with payments in kind, such as wheat or cattle, they must produce exactly the item required, or barter it at a great loss or inconvenience. But when the obligation takes a monetary form, the peasant is free as to whether to grow wheat, or keep cattle, or engage in other activities, as long as they pay the required tax.

Freedom also arises because money enables an economic system of increasing complexity in which any single relation becomes less important and thus more impersonal. As a result, the individual experiences a sense of independence and self-sufficiency. There is another sense in which money is conducive to freedom, and it originates from the observation that the owner is truly entitled to its possessions only if he takes care of its upkeep and of making it bear fruits. Money is more flexible than land or other assets, and thus it frees the owner from those activities that are specific to real entities. Since monetary possessions no longer ties the owner to a specific type of work, money leads to increased freedom. Consequently, monetary ownership enables the position of a purely intellectual worker and, by the same line of reasoning, it also implies that a wealthy man can lead a modest life. As for workers and managers, they only contribute work for wages and only deal with an impersonal market, and thus their personality is separated from specific work activities. In the case of civil servants, they are paid a fixed salary that is largely independent of any specific work performance, and see their personality freed from work activities. The same hold for artists, such as a musician who is paid the same fee regardless of how well he plays.

Although the monetary system enhances individual freedom, it can also lead to consequences that are questionable. An employee does not necessarily have better living conditions than a slave does, as a precise amount of money corresponds imprecisely to its effective purchasing power. In a money economy, individuals will tend to put their financial interests above the goals of society or of the state. If a peasant sells his land even for a fair price, monetary freedom differs from the personal activity afforded by possession of the land. More generally, freedom from something does not necessarily equate with the freedom to do something else because money is "empty" and flexible, and does not direct the owner toward any specific activity. Although monetary payments can free from the obligations of specific in-kind contributions, it has also the effect of removing the involvement of the individual from a broader context. For example, when the Athenian vassal states had to contribute with ships and troops, the tributaries were directly involved in Athens's foreign and military policy, at least to the extent that drafted soldiers could not effectively be deployed against their home states. Once the military contribution was replaced by a monetary tribute, no such constraint could be placed on Athens's policy. The natural evolution of this state of affairs is that despotic regimes tend to favor a monetary economy.

== Personal values ==
Personal values can be quantified in terms of equivalent money amounts. An example is the weregild, the monetary value that must be paid to a family if one of his members is killed. The weregild was truly a reflection of personal values, in this case of a lost life, rather than the compensation for the income stream that the deceased would have provided to the family. Similarly, personal values are also quantified by the practice of marriage by purchase and of prostitution. However, the historical trend has been toward an increased awareness of individual distinctions whereas money is intrinsically fungible. As a result, money has been progressively considered as an inappropriate equivalent to personal values, and most of these practices have fallen into disuse. When these practices survive, the amount of money is so large that it introduces an affective element in the transaction. A wife purchased for an exorbitant amount is especially dear to the heart.

Money is fungible and, as such, it stands in sharp contrast with the idea of distinction, according to which an entity is set apart from and incomparable with a majority. Distinction is a property of nobility, or of some works of art, for example. Simmel takes as a case in point the House of Lords, which functions as the sole judge of its members and at the same time refuses to sit in judgment of any other individual. In this sense, the Lords value distinction to the extent that even the exercise of authority on other people would be seen as a degradation. The quantitative aspects of money has the potential to threaten and debase the qualitative notion of distinction.

== Style of life ==
As values can be quantified in monetary terms, our relationship with objects has lost most of its emotional character and has become more intellectual. On the one hand, our rational attitude can lead us to become individualistic, to an atomization of society, and even to disregard respect and kindness. On the other hand, there are often clear advantages in relying on intellect rather than on emotions. At any rate, Simmel maintains that intellect is a tool and, as such, it lacks an intrinsic sense of direction and can be put to use for different purposes. Rationality originates from the objective, purely arithmetic nature of money, and is mirrored by the tenet that law is equal for everyone and that in a democracy all votes are equal. The ability of fitting in an increasingly intellectual environment is reinforced by education, which in turn is mostly accessible to those who can afford it. As a result, money can lead to the creation of a de facto aristocracy of the affluent. The converse is that egalitarian tendencies typically reject the money system.

The objective nature of money ultimately arises from the division of labor, in which the product is divorced from the worker's personality and work is treated as a commodity. Similarly, products are no longer tailored to the specific customer and do not reflect his personality, production tools are specialized to the point that the worker has little leeway in the way he operates the machines, and fashion changes so rapidly that nobody gets personally or socially attached to it. This state of affairs stands in contrast with the arts, which reflects the individuality of the author. Money can increase the distance between individuals to the point that it allows them to fit in crowded cities and to liberate individuals from the yoke of working on a family business. (Incidentally, financial activities are concentrated in major cities, and the concentration of money increases the pace and variety of life.) Humankind has become progressively more independent of the rhythms of nature and more dependent on the business cycle. "Objects and people have become separated from one another" declares Simmel, and was to compare this phenomenon with Marx's theory of alienation.

Money rises above individual conflicts while being an essential participant of the conflict. It has transcended its characteristics of a tool when it has become the center around which the economic system rotates, at which point it also takes the role of an all-encompassing teleological circle. Simmel was to compare this phenomenon with Marx's commodity fetishism.

Yet, division of labor makes it possible to construct intellectual and scientific contents that surpass the ability of the individual mind. Even in these cases, though, it may be essential that a synthesis be accomplished by a single mind. Similarly, as material concerns become impersonal, what is left can become more personal. For example, as the typewriter has relieved the writer from the cumbersome mechanics of writing, he can devote more attention to the original contents of his work. It really depends on humankind whether money will lead to increased distinctiveness and refinement or not.

== Social effects of money ==
Simmel's outlook, while gloomy, is not wholly negative. As money and transactions increase, the independence of an individual decreases as he is drawn into a holistic network of exchange governed by quantifiable monetary value. Paradoxically, this results in greater potential freedom of choice for the individual, as money can be deployed toward any possible goal, even if most people's sheer lack of money renders that potential quite low much of the time. Money's homogenizing nature encourages greater liberty and equality and melts away forms of feudalism and patronage, even as it minimizes exceptional, incommensurable achievements in art and love.
