= Pere Bosch-Gimpera =

Mexican anthropologist and archaeologist

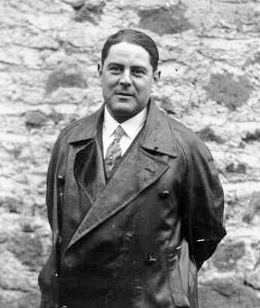
Pedro Bosch-Gimpera in 1927

Pere Bosch-Gimpera (1891 in Barcelona, Catalonia, Spain – 1974 in Mexico) was a Spanish-born Mexican archaeologist and anthropologist.

He went into exile in Mexico, with many other intellectuals, after the Spanish Civil War. He became a Mexican citizen in 1971.

== Career ==
Although he began studying Law, he changed to Philology, in which he obtained a doctorate in 1911. With the aim of becoming professor of Greek he also obtained a doctorate in History in 1913. From 1911 to 1914 he studied Greek Philology, Prehistory and Ancient History in Berlin, with the aid of a scholarship. Once there, the advice of Wilamowitz-Moellendorf made him change course and he moved from Greek language and literature to prehistoric archaeology.

From 1916 to 1939, he was chair of Ancient and Medieval History at the University of Barcelona. At the same time he served as director of the Archaeological Research Service of the “Institut d'Estudis Catalans”. From the publication in 1919 of Prehistòria Catalana, he strongly advocated the use of Catalan in scientific publications. Between 1916 and 1931, he led the archaeological section of the museums of Barcelona; from 1931 to 1933, he was dean of the Faculty of Philosophy and Philology; between 1933 and 1939, he was president of the University of Barcelona.

Involved in Catalan politics, he was Minister of Justice of Catalonia in the Government of Lluís Companys. After the events of 6 October 1934, he was made prisoner along with other members of the Catalan Government on the ship Uruguay, which aroused international complaints. After the Spanish Civil War he went into exile in Mexico, together with many intellectuals. Subsequently, he suffered from a vilifying campaign at the University of Barcelona. He acquired Mexican nationality in 1971.

He also taught at the universities of Berlin (1921), Edinburgh (1936), Oxford (1939–1941), Paris (1961) and Heidelberg (1966), among other European universities. From 1941, he was professor at the Autonomous University and the School (Escuela General) of Archaeology at the University of Mexico City, positions he held until his death in 1974. He was also a professor at the University of Guatemala (1945–1947), director of the Division of Philosophy and Humanities of UNESCO (1948–1953), and secretary general of the Union of Anthropological and Ethnological Sciences (1953–1966)

== Honorary memberships ==
The most important:

- Honorary member of the Royal Anthropological Institute of Great Britain and Ireland
- Honorary member of the Society of Antiquaries of London
- Honorary member of the Institut d'Estudis Catalans of Barcelona
- Honorary member of the Deutsches Archaeologisches Institut of Berlín
- Honorary member of the Hispanic Society of America of Washington
- Correspondent member of the Académie des Inscriptions et Belles Lettres of Paris
- Correspondent member of the Pontificia Academia Romana di Archeologia of Rome
- Correspondent member of the Archaeological Society of Jutland

== Main works ==
- Prehistòria Catalana: edats de la pedra i dels metalls, colonització grega, etnografia (1919)
- La arqueología preromana hispánica (1920)
- Etnología de la Península Ibérica (1932)
- El poblamiento antiguo y la formación de los pueblos de España (1945)
- El problema indoeuropeo (1960)
- El Próximo Oriente en la Antigüedad (1964)
- La Universitat i Catalunya (1969)
- Historia de Oriente (1971)
- La América precolombina (1971)
- Las raíces de Europa (1974)
- La América prehispánica (1974)
