= Ulysses G. Weatherly =

American sociologist (1865–1940)

Ulysses Grant Weatherly (21 April 1865 – 18 July 1940) was an American sociologist who served as Professor of Sociology at Indiana University and a founding member of the American Sociological Society, and on its executive committee from 1907 to 1910. He was appointed as vice president thereof in 1920 and president in 1923.

== Early life and education ==
Ulysses Grant Weatherly was born on April 21, 1865, in West Newton, Indiana, to William and Lydia Weatherly. He received his A.B. from Colgate University in 1890. From 1893 to 1894, Weatherly attended the University of Leipzig. He received his PhD from Cornell University in 1894. Weatherly graduated from Pillsbury Academy in 1896 and attended Columbia University from 1899 to 1900. In 1910, he received a Litt.D from Colgate University.

== Career ==
After completing his PhD, Weatherly taught for one year at Central High School in Philadelphia, Pennsylvania. In 1895, Weatherly joined the faculty at Indiana University as an assistant professor in European History. He was promoted to associate professor in 1896. In 1899, Weatherly was appointed to Full Professor in the Department of Economics and Sociology. In 1900, he was named chair of the department, a position he held until his retirement in June 1935. After retirement, Weatherly was named Professor Emeritus in Economics and Sociology. During his tenure at IU, he was a visiting professor of sociology at the summer sessions of University of Colorado at Columbia, University of Illinois, University of Oregon, and University of Southern California.

Weatherly was very active in several community and professional organizations during his career. He was a founding member of the American Sociological Society when it was organized in 1905. Weatherly served on the executive committee of the American Sociological Society from 1907 to 1910. He served as vice-president of the American Sociological Society from 1920 to 1923 and as president from 1923 to 1924. Weatherly was President of the Indiana Conference of Charities from 1911 to 1912 and Chairman of the Indiana Child Labor Commission from 1909 to 1915. He was also an active member of the Eugenics Research Association and the Indiana chapter of Phi Beta Kappa.

== Marriage and family ==
Weatherly married Alice May Burgess in 1890. They had one daughter, Ruth Burgess.

== Death ==
Weatherly died on July 18, 1940, in Cortland, New York.

== Books ==
- Social Progress: Studies in the Dynamics of Social Change (1926)

== Articles ==
"A World-Wide Color Line" . Popular Science Monthly. Vol. 79. November 1911. ISSN 0161-7370 – via Wikisource.
