= 1920s in anthropology =

- 1910s
- 1920s in anthropology
- 1930s
Other topics in 1920s:
- Comics
- Fashion
- Music
- Science and technology
- Sociology
- Television

Timeline of anthropology, 1920–1929

== Events ==
1922

- Nanook of the North is released in theatres.

1924

- Taung child fossil discovered.

== Publications ==
1921

- Language: An Introduction To The Study Of Speech by Edward Sapir

1922

- Argonauts of the Western Pacific by Bronislaw Malinowski

1925

- Handbook of the Indians of California by Alfred Kroeber

1927

- Sex and Repression in Savage Society by Bronislaw Malinowski

1928

- Coming of Age in Samoa by Margaret Mead

== Births ==
1921

- Mary Douglas

1922

- Sidney Mintz

1924

- Colin Turnbull

1925

- Kathleen Aberle
- Carlos Castaneda
- Frantz Fanon
- Ernest Gellner
- Claude Meillassoux

1926

- Nakane Chie
- Clifford Geertz
- Robert Paine
- Roy Rappaport

1927

- Elizabeth Warnock Fernea
- Marvin Harris
- Dell Hymes

1928

- Fredrik Barth
- William Bright
- Noam Chomsky

== Deaths ==
1921

- James Mooney

1922

- W. H. R. Rivers

1928

- Pliny Earle Goddard
