= Filipinas dentro de cien años =

Filipino nationalist essay

Cover of the 1905 edition of the essay, published to commemorate the 15th anniversary of La Solidaridad

Filipinas dentro de cien años ("The Philippines a century hence") is a socio-political essay written in four parts (September 1889- January 1890) in the magazine La solidaridad by José Rizal. It is one of the most significant political works of the movement in Spain, Rizal tracing the circumstances that brought about the awakening of the Filipino and consequently the birth of the Filipino spirit of a nation. He underscores the need to establish a new kind of political relationship between Spain and the Philippines if the former does not wish a total break-up with the latter. Spain is being given a sort of ultimatum: reform or independence.

The article ends with a prediction on the possible political intervention of European or neighboring powers or even that of the United States should the Philippines declare itself independent from Spain. He dismisses that possibility, given the existence of other more enticing economic prospects. Rizal also predicted that the country will adopt a federal republic government once it is liberated. He also warned that bloody uprisings may happen if the country doesn't undergo drastic changes.
