= Edward Dozier =

American linguist

- Born: 1916
- Died: 1971 (aged 54–55)

Academic background
- Education: University of California, Los Angeles, University of New Mexico

Academic work
- Discipline: anthropology and linguistics
- Institutions: University of Arizona

Edward Pasqual Dozier (born Eduardo de Pascua Dozier; 1916 in Santa Clara Pueblo, New Mexico – 1971 in Tucson, Arizona) was a Pueblo Native American anthropologist and linguist who studied Native Americans and the peoples of northern Luzon in the Philippines. He was the first Native American to earn a PhD in anthropology in the United States.

== Background ==
Dozier was of Tewa ethnicity, from Santa Clara Pueblo. He spoke only Tewa to the age of 12. His father, Thomas Dozier, was an Anglo-American schoolteacher who was adopted into a Tewa clan. His mother, Maria Lucaria Gutierrez (Tewa: P’oo kwi tsaawaa), was a member of the Tewa Badger clan. Eduardo and his siblings were raised as members of the Winter moiety of the Santa Clara pueblo.

== Education and career ==
During World War II, Dozier served in the US Army Air Corps in the Pacific theater. At that time he anglicized his name to Edward P. Dozier. He earned his BA from the University of New Mexico in anthropology in 1947. He later earned a MA from the same institution. His PhD was from the University of California, Los Angeles in 1952, where he was influenced by Harry Hoijer.

He was professor of anthropology and linguistics at the Tucson campus of the University of Arizona from 1960 until his death in 1971. Before taking up the position at the University of Arizona-Tucson, he held a number of other academic positions. He was an instructor in anthropology at the University of Oregon in 1951–52, and a researcher at the Wenner‐Gren Foundation in 1952–53. From 1953 to 1958 he rose from instructor to associate professor at Northwestern University. He was a research fellow at Stanford University in 1958–59 and a field researcher funded by the National Science Foundation in the Philippines in 1959–60.

At the time of his death, Dozier was helping to found the American Indian Studies Program at the University of Arizona-Tucson.

== Works ==
- The Hopi-Tewa of Arizona. University of California publications in American archaeology and ethnology. University of California, Berkeley. 1954.
- Hano: A Tewa Indian Community in Arizona. Thomas Learning, Inc. 2002. ISBN 0-03-075653-7.
- Mountain arbiters: The changing life of a Philippine hill people. University of Arizona Press. 1966.
- The Pueblo Indians of North America. Prospect Heights, Ill: Waveland Press, 1983. 1983. ISBN 0-88133-059-0.
