= 1870s in music =

The 1870s was a decade where the only way to obtain music was on sheet music sold in stores. There were several varieties of music in the 1870s.

== U.S. and North America ==
=== Traditional folk music ===
Traditional folk songs were some of the most popular fare of this decade. While the American Civil War was over and the conflict was healing much of the passion from that era remained in these post-war songs. Many of the songs most remembered today from this decade are prime examples of this tradition well. Some of this decade's hits were songs still seen today, including "Carry Me Back to Old Virginny" "Good-bye, Liza Jane", and "My Grandfather's Clock". These songs involved more philosophical and emotional content than hits before the war like "Camptown Races". For this reason, many American folk songs from the 1870s are remembered well today. C.A. White wrote many great songs of the era such as "Marguerite", "Moonlight on the Lake", "When 'Tis Moonlight", and "The Fisherman and His Child". Songs such as "Barney, Take Me Home Again" and "I'll Take You Home Again, Kathleen" were designed to go together. Folk songs were also used in political campaigns as they long had been before the era of television. Rutherford B. Hayes used the song "The Boys in Blue will see it Through" as his campaign song. This was a new era of passion in music. While the mainstream saw many sorts of songs after the war there were also the kind of songs which formed part of another group. There were many songs of the folk genre in this time period. Choruses continued their evolution to be the major part of a song in this period. In songs before this, the chorus is not any more important than the verses. This is a major change which characterizes folk music from the 1870s.

=== Political protest songs ===
As in later decades, the 1870s saw many songs which were designed to get the listeners to support a certain political point of view or perspective. This was the dawn of a new musical genre which has been influencing a good deal of music in the modern world as well. The big things which inspired protests in this time were prohibiting alcohol, which became a major goal of the progressive era, especially among Republicans. These included hits such as "Sons of Temperance" and "Let Us Pass This Goodly Measure". Some were militant and others sentimental, often dealing with the perspective of the abused child of an alcoholic. On the other side were songs like "Now Suppose You Pass This Measure" and songs which showed children in Poverty while their parents attended temperance meetings. These were intended to mock temperance. There were also those who supported allowing women to vote, which became a theme in certain political songs such as "Daughters of Freedom! The Ballot be Yours" These suffrage songs gained much publicity in the United States, though many were since lost due to copyright issues. In short, political causes became a major theme in popular music for the first time in the 1870s, with the exception of campaign songs for candidates which were already a major musical genre and remained so until the 1950s when they were largely replaced by television.

=== Broadway ===
This was the first decade in which there was competition from numbers originally written for the stage. Before this, the closest thing to that was opera. Opera often was in foreign languages such as German, Italian, and French. The musical took form in 1866 with The Black Crook opening on Broadway. The show Out of Bondage was a big hit in this decade as it helped spread a noble image of reconstruction. This was a new genre which would come into greater prominence until it became the largest segment of the music industry in the Tin Pan Alley era. The Tin Pan Alley era had of course not begun yet and the influence of Broadway musicals on popular music at the time was no more than that of opera.

== U.K. and Europe ==
=== British Music Hall ===
The 1870s saw the expansion of the British Music Hall genre. Those who wrote music began more than ever to write them for live performances. It was an era of light music. The well-known composer G. H. MacDermott was known for his dedication to themes which were not appropriate at the time which led many to ban his work. This was an important period of transition in English music as it went from the focus on rotating pieces in performance to the era of the Gilbert and Sullivan operetta.
