= J. Campbell Cory =

American cartoonist

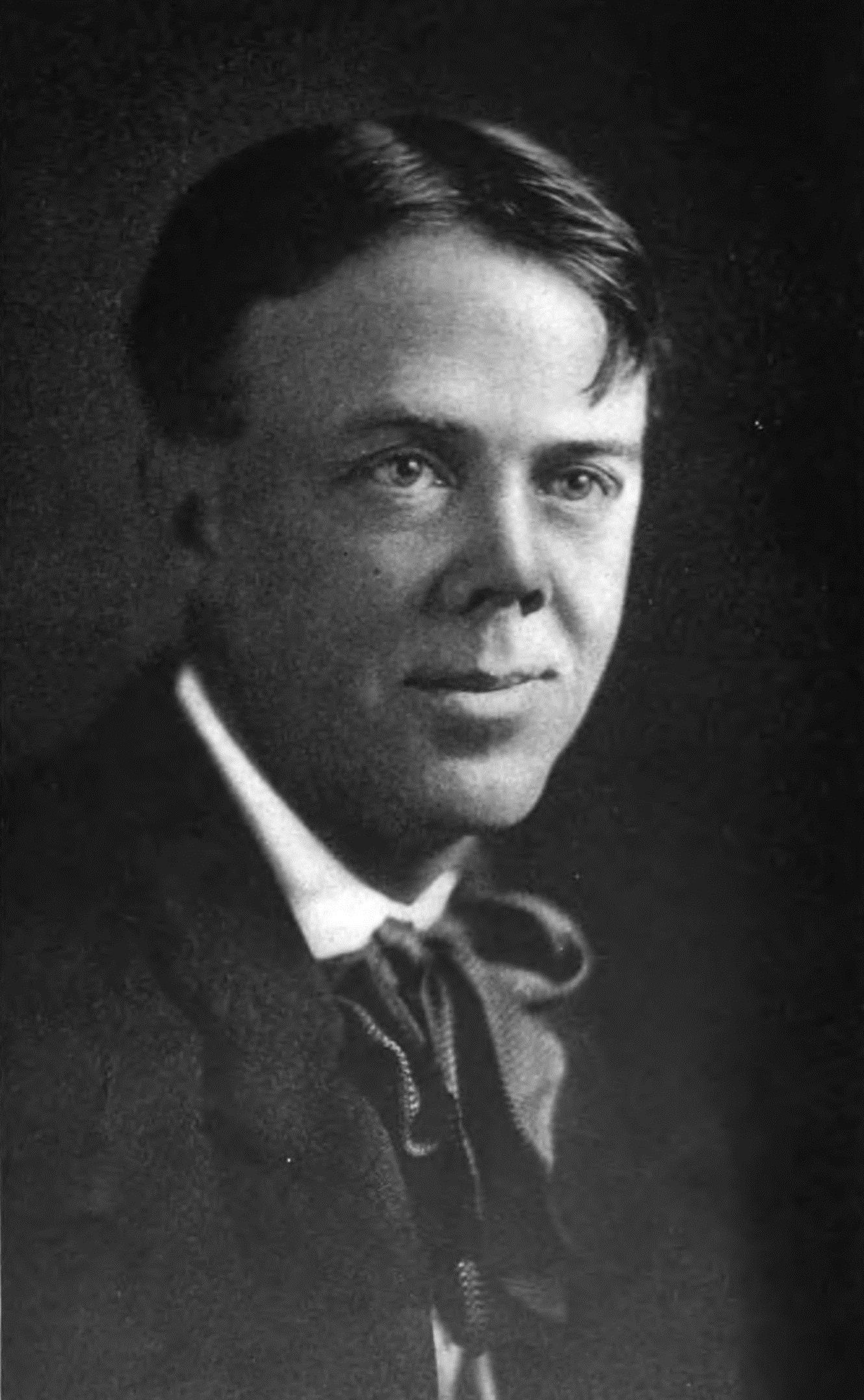
- Born: September 11, 1867; Waukegan, Illinois
- Died: November 17, 1925 (aged 58); Denver, Colorado

John Campbell Cory (September 11, 1867 – November 17, 1925) was an American newspaper cartoonist. His work appeared in the New York Journal, New York World, Chicago Herald, as well as the Rocky Mountain News and The Denver Times.

Cory was born in Waukegan, Illinois, the second child of Benjamin Sayre Cory Jr. and Jessie S. (MacDougal) Cory. His sister Fanny Young Cory (1877–1972) also became a noted cartoonist. From age 14 to 15 he worked in an architect's office in Chicago, then New York. Upon his return, he worked on a farm for two years, where became known as an animal artist, particularly horses. His illustrations appeared in livestock journals from 1887 to 1896. He married Sarah Bertha Pollock in Chicago on February 14, 1890. He was writing and illustrating horse racing articlesin the New York Journal until 1898, when he left to found The Bee, a weekly newspaper of political cartoons, which he published from May 16 until August 2, 1898. After the Bee folded, he joined the New York World as staff cartoonist from 1898 to 1901. He was an instructor and vice president of the New York School of Caricature (founded 1901). In 1901 he relocated to Montana to pursue mining. He returned to New York in 1905, continuing at the World until 1907. In 1908 he established the monthly publication The Great West, and joined the staff of the Cincinnati Times-Star, where he worked for 18 months then joined Scripps News Service from 1912 to 1914. He produced a book, The Cartoonist's Art in 1912. In October, 1918, he became a cartoonist for the Rocky Mountain News and the Denver Times, where he worked until his death. He established the Denver Academy of Applied Art with Perce Pearce. Cory died in Denver, November 17, 1925, aged 58.
