= Franklin Henry Giddings =

American sociologist and economist (1855–1931)

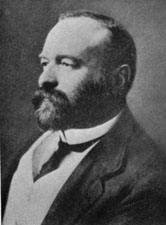
Franklin Henry Giddings

Franklin Henry Giddings (March 23, 1855 – June 11, 1931) was an American sociologist, economist, and journalist.

== Biography ==
Giddings was born at Sherman, Connecticut. His father was an Evangelical minister. He graduated with a degree from Union College in 1877. For ten years he wrote items for the Springfield, Massachusetts Republican and the Daily Union.

From 1888 to 1894, he was lecturer in political science at Bryn Mawr College. From 1891 until his death, he was on the faculty of Columbia University. He became professor of sociology at Columbia University in 1894. From 1892 to 1905 he was a vice president of the American Academy of Political and Social Science.

Harry Elmer Barnes said that Giddings was "veritably obsessed with anti-Germanism, which after 1918, turned into anti-Bolshevism". According to Barnes, Giddings' "lectures were more often diatribes against his pet hates than calm sociological analysis".

His most significant contribution is the concept of the consciousness of kind, which is a state of mind whereby one conscious being recognizes another as being of like mind. All human motives organize themselves around consciousness of kind as a determining principle. Association leads to conflict which leads to consciousness of kind through communication, imitation, toleration, co-operation, and alliance. Eventually the group achieves a self-consciousness of its own (as opposed to individual self-consciousness) from which traditions and social values can arise.

He also coined the term collective behavior.

In 1914 he became one of the inaugural Fellows of the American Statistical Association.

Giddings died in Scarsdale, New York.

== Works ==
- The Modern Distributive Process (in collaboration with J.B. Clark, 1888).
- The Theory of Sociology (1894).
- The Principles of Sociology (1896).
- The Theory of Socialization (1897).
- Elements of Sociology (1898).
- Democracy and Empire (1900).
- Inductive Sociology (1901).
- Descriptive and Historical Sociology (1906).
- The Responsible State (1918).
