= 1940s in sociology =

- 1930s
- 1940s in sociology
- 1950s
Other topics in 1940s:
- Anthropology
- Comics
- Fashion
- Motorsport
- Music
- Science and technology
- Television

The following events related to sociology occurred in the 1940s. In particular, this was a critical decade for the publication of a number of important works, including both during World War II and its aftermath. A number of notable sociologists were born during the Baby Boom Generation that started in 1945.

== 1940 ==
- Marc Bloch's Feudal Society is published.
- Marc Bloch's Strange Defeat; a Statement of Evidence is published.
- Franz Boas's Race, Language and Culture is published.
- Sir Edward Evans-Pritchard's The Nuer is published.
- Meyer Fortes's African Political Systems is published.
- David V. Glass's Population Policies and Movements in Europe is published.
- Walter Benjamin's On the Concept of History is published.
- Robert M. MacIver serves as president of the ASA.

=== Births ===
- March 16: Claus Offe
- October 14: George Ritzer

=== Deaths ===
- September 27: Walter Benjamin

== 1941 ==
- Melville Jean Herskovits' The Myth of the Negro Past is published.
- George Homans' English villages in the Thirteenth Century is published.
- Harold Lasswell's The Garrison State is published.
- Herbert Marcuse's Reason and Revolution is published.
- Karl Marx's Grundrisse is published.
- Pitirim Sorokin's Social and Cultural Dynamics is published.
- William Lloyd Warner's Social Life of a Modern Community is published.

== 1942 ==
- William Beveridge's Social Insurance and Allied Services is published.
- James Burnham's The Managerial revolution is published
- Stuart C. Dodd's Dimensions of Society is published.
- Georges Gurvitch's Sociology of Law is published.
- Siegfried Frederick Nadel's A Black Byzantium is published.
- Franz Leopold Neumann's Behemoth: The Structure and Practice of National Socialism is published.
- Wilhelm Reich's The Mass Psychology of Fascism is published.
- Joseph Schumpeter's Capitalism, Socialism and Democracy is published.
- Dwight Sanderson serves as president of the American Sociological Association.

=== Births ===
- Michael Mann
- February 9: Manuel Castells

=== Deaths ===
- May 16: Bronislaw Malinowski
- December 22: Franz Boas

== 1943 ==
- Jean-Paul Sartre's Being and Nothingness is published.

== 1944 ==
- William Beveridge's Full Employment in a Free Society is published.
- W. E. B. Du Bois' Jacob and Esau is published.
- Morris Ginsberg's Moral Progress is published.
- Friedrich Hayek' The Road to Serfdom is published.
- Clyde Kluckhohn' Navajo Witchcraft is published.
- Alfred Louis Kroeber' Configurations of Cultural Growth is published.
- Paul Felix Lazarsfeld' The People's Choice is published.
- Helen Merrell Lynd' England in the Eighteen Eighties: Toward a Social Basis for Freedom is published.
- Gunnar Myrdal's An American Dilemma: The Negro Problem and Modern Democracy is published.
- Karl Polanyi' The Great Transformation is published.
- Rupert B. Vance serves as president of the ASA.

=== Births ===
- July 19: Karin Knorr Cetina
- Donna Haraway
- Edmund Wnuk-Lipinski
- Ulrich Beck

=== Deaths ===
- February 7: Robert E. Park

== 1945 ==
- Ruth Fulton Benedict's The Chrysanthemum and the Sword is published.
- Helen Merrell Lynd's Field Work in College Education is published.
- Maurice Merleau-Ponty's Phenomenology of Perception is published.
- Sir Karl Raimund Popper's The Open Society and its Enemies is published.

== 1946 ==
- Morris Janowitz's The Professional Soldier is published.
- C. Wright Mills and Hans Gerth's From Max Weber is published.
- Viola Klein's The Feminine Character: History of an Ideology is published.
- Carl C. Taylor serves as president of the American Sociological Association.
- Activities of the German Society for Sociology are resumed and Leopold Von Weise becomes chairperson.

=== Births ===
- April 12: Richard Machalek
- September 7: Francisco Varela

== 1947 ==
- Theodor Adorno's The Stars down to Earth is published.
- Theodor Adorno's and Max Horkheimer's Dialectic of Enlightenment is published.
- Fei Xiaotong's Shengyu zhidu 《生育制度》 (The institutions for reproduction) is published.
- Max Horkheimer's The Eclipse of Reason is published.
- George Lundberg's Can Science Save Us? is published.
- George Elton Mayo's The Social Problems of Industrial Civilization is published.
- Thomas Humphrey Marshall's Sociology at the Crossroads is published.
- Robert Morrison MacIver's The Web of Government is published.

== 1948 ==
- Chester Barnard's Organisation and Management is published.
- Oliver Cox's Caste, Class and Race is published.
- Kingsley Davis' Human Society is published.
- Fei Xiaotong's Xiangtu chongjian 《鄉土重建》 (Rural recovery) is published.
- Alfred Kinsey' Sexual Behaviour in the Human Male is published.
- Robert Lowie' Social Organisation is published.
- C. Wright Mills' The New Men of Power: America's Labor Leaders is published.
- E. Franklin Frazier serves as president of the ASA.

=== Births ===
- January 9: Claude S. Fischer

=== Deaths ===
- September 17: Ruth Benedict

== 1949 ==
- Marc Bloch's The Historian's Craft is published.
- Simone de Beauvoir's The Second Sex is published.
- Meyer Fortes' The Web of Kinship among the Tallensi is published.
- E. Franklin Frazier's The Negro in the United States is published.
- Robert K. Merton's Social Theory and Social Structure is published.
- Max Weber's General Economic History is published (posthumously).
- International Sociological Association is founded.
