= 1960s in sociology =

- 1950s
- 1960s in sociology
- 1970s
Other topics in 1960s:
- Anthropology
- Comics
- Fashion
- Motorsport
- Music
- Science and technology
- Television

The following events related to sociology occurred in the 1960s. The decade was a critical one for the publication of a large number of important works.

== 1960 ==
- Raymond Aron's Main Currents in Sociological Thought is published.
- Simone de Beauvoir's The Prime of Life is published.
- Daniel Bell's The End of Ideology is published.
- Friedrich Hayek's The Constitution of Liberty is published.
- R.D. Laing's The Divided Self is published.
- C. Wright Mills's Listen, Yankee: The Revolution in Cuba and Images of man is published.
- Jean-Paul Sartre's Critique of Dialectical Reason is published.
- Joan Woodward's The Saleswoman is published.
- Michael Young's and Peter Willmott's Family and class in a London suburb is published.
- Howard S. Becker serves as president of the ASA.

=== Deaths ===
- October 5: Alfred L. Kroeber

== 1961 ==
- James S. Coleman's The Adolescent Society is published.
- Maurice Duverger's Method Of The Social Sciences is published.
- Michel Foucault's Madness and Civilisation is published.
- Georges Friedmann's The Anatomy of Work is published.
- Morris Ginsberg's Essays in Sociology and Social Philosophy is published.
- Erving Goffman's Asylums is published.
- George C. Homans' Social Behavior: Its Elementary Forms is published.
- R.D. Laing's The Self and Others is published.
- Oscar Lewis's The Children of Sanchez is published.
- Robert E.L. Faris serves as president of the ASA.

== 1962 ==
- Rachel Carson's Silent Spring is published.
- Oliver Cox's Capitalism and American Leadership is published.
- George Homans' Sentiments and Activities is published.
- Roman Jakobson's Selected Writings is published.
- Thomas Kuhn's The Structure of Scientific Revolutions is published.
- Edmund Leach's Rethinking Anthropology is published.
- C. Wright Mills' The Marxists is published.
- Arnold Marshall Rose's Human Behaviour and Social Processes is published.
- Richard Titmuss' Income Distribution and Social change is published.
- Paul Lazarsfeld serves as president of the American Sociological Association.

=== Deaths ===
- March 20: C. Wright Mills

== 1963 ==
- Howard Saul Becker's Outsiders is published.
- Shmuel Noah Eisenstadt's Political systems of empires is published.
- Michel Foucault's The Birth of the Clinic is published.
- Erving Goffman's Stigma is published.
- Thomas Humphrey Marshall's Class, Citizenship and Social Development is published.
- C. Wright Mills's Power, Politics and People is published.
- Karl Popper's Conjectures and Refutations is published.
- William Lloyd Warner's Yankee City series is published.

== 1964 ==
- Oliver Cox's Capitalism as a system is published.
- Georges Friedmann's Industrial Society: The Emergence of the Human Problems of Automation is published.
- Ernest Gellner's Thought and Change is published.
- Alvin Ward Gouldner's Anti-Minataur; The Myth of Value-free Sociology is published.
- R.D. Laing's Sanity, Madness and the Family is published.
- Herbert Marcuse's One-Dimensional Man is published.
- C. Wright Mills's Sociology and Pragmatism is published.
- William Fielding Ogburn's On Cultural and Social Change is published.
- Louis Wirth's On Cities and Social Life is published.

== 1965 ==
- Louis Althusser's For Marx is published.
- Louis Althusser's Reading Capital is published.
- Ralf Dahrendorf's Society and Democracy in Germany is published.
- Morris Ginsberg's On Justice In Society is published.
- Ian Hacking's The Logic of Statistical Inference is published.
- Herbert Marcuse's Repressive Tolerance is published.
- Thomas Humphrey Marshall's Social Policy in the Twentieth Century is published.
- Daniel Patrick Moynihan's Moynihan Report is published.
- Otto Stammer's Political Sociology and Democratic Society is published.
- Joan Woodward's Industrial Organisation: Theory and Practice is published.
- Florian Znaniecki's Social Relations and Social Roles is published.
- Pitirim A. Sorokin serves as president of the ASA.
- Founding of the Economic and Social Research Council

=== Births ===
- Nildo Viana

=== Deaths ===
- March 13: Corrado Gini

== 1966 ==
- Theodor Adorno's The Negative Dialect is published.
- Theodor Adorno's Salmagundi is published.
- Robert Adrey's The Central Imperative is published.
- Raymond Aron's Peace and War: A Theory of International Relations is published.
- Peter Berger's and Thomas Luckmann's The Social Construction of Reality is published.
- James S. Coleman's Equality of Educational Opportunity is published.
- Maurice Duverger's Political Sociology is published.
- Michel Foucault's The Order of Things is published.
- Jacques Lacan's Ecrits is published.
- R.D. Laing's Interpersonal Perception: A Theory and a Method of Research is published.
- Oscar Lewis' La Vida is published.
- Barrington Moore Jr.'s Social Origins of Dictatorship and Democracy is published.
- Talcott Parsons' Societies: Evolutionary and Comparative Perspectives is published.
- Karl Popper's Of Clouds and Clocks is published.
- Bryan Wilson's Religion in a Secular Society is published.
- Wilbert E. Moore serves as president of the ASA.

=== Deaths ===
- April 14: George A. Lundberg
- October 6: Alexander Morris Carr-Saunders
- December 27: Ernest Burgess

== 1967 ==
- Peter Berger's The Sacred Canopy is published.
- Peter Michael Blau's and Otis Dudley Duncan's The American Occupational Structure is published.
- Andre Gunder Frank's Capitalism and Underdevelopment in Latin America is published.
- Harold Garfinkel's Studies in Ethnomethodology is published.
- Max Horkheimer's Critique of Instrumental Reason is published.
- R.D. Laing's The Politics of Experience is published.
- Nicos Panayiotou Mouzelis's Organisation and Bureaucracy: An analysis of Modern Theories is published.
- John Rex's and Moore, R. S.'s Race, Community and Conflict: A Study of Sparkbrook is published.
- Victor Turner's The Forest of Symbols is published.
- The National Deviancy Conference holds its first meeting at the University of York.

== 1968 ==
- Raymond Aron's The Elusive Revolution is published.
- Jürgen Habermas' Knowledge and Human Interests is published.
- Viola Klein's and Alva Myrdal's Women's Two Roles: Home and Work, 2nd edition is published.
- Geoffry Duncan Mitchell's A Hundred Years of Sociology is published.
- Gunnar Myrdal's Asian Drama: An inquiry into the Poverty of Nations is published.
- Frank Parkin's Middle class radicalism : the social bases of the British Campaign for Nuclear Disarmament is published.
- Nicos Poulantzas' Political Power and Social Classes is published.
- Cyril Smith's Adolescence : an introduction to the problems of order and the opportunities for continuity presented by adolescence in Britain is published.
- The destruction of the 'Prague Spring' and the failure of the May '68 revolutions results in the beginning of the end of traditional Marxism as a sociological paradigm.

== 1969 ==
- Louis Althusser's Lenin and Philosophy is published.
- Herbert Blumer's Symbolic Interactionism is published.
- Andre Gunder Frank's Latin America: Underdevelopment or revolution is published.
- Andre Gunder Frank's Sociology of Development and Underdevelopment of Sociology is published.
- Ernest Gellner's Saints of the Atlas is published.
- Edmund Leach's Genesis as Myth and Other Essays is published.
- David Matza's Causes of Delinquency is published.
- Ralph Miliband's The State in Capitalist Society is published.
- Dorothy Swaine Thomas' The Salvage is published.
- Victor Turner's The Ritual Process is published.
