= 1950s in sociology =

- 1940s
- 1950s in sociology
- 1960s
Other topics in 1950s:
- Anthropology
- Comics
- Fashion
- Motorsport
- Music
- Science and technology
- Television

The following events related to sociology occurred in the 1950s. This was a critical decade for the publication of a number of important works in sociology, both academic and popular literature. Women first started to have success within the study of sociology in this decade; the first woman president was elected to lead the American Sociological Association in this period.

== 1950 ==
- Theodor Adorno's The Authoritarian Personality is published.
- George Homans's The Human Group is published.
- Thomas Humphrey Marshall's Citizenship and Social Class.
- Richard Titmuss' The Problems of Social Policy is published.
- British Journal of Sociology launched.
- Sociology viewed as a Social Philosophy at the University of Santo Tomas is initiated by Fr. Valentin Marin with Criminology, followed by A.W. Salt and Murray Bartlett at University of the Philippines and by Clyde Helfin at Silliman University.

== 1951 ==
- Theodor Adorno's Minima Moralia is published.
- Maurice Duverger's Political Parties is published.
- Theodor Geiger's Social Mobility within the Danish Middle-Class is published.
- Rosa Luxemburg's The Accumulation of Capital is published.
- C. Wright Mills' White Collar: The American Middle Classes is published.
- Talcott Parsons' The Social System is published.
- Robert C. Angell serves as president of the ASA.
- Society for the Study of Social Problems is founded.
- British Sociological Association is founded by Morris Ginsberg and others

== 1952 ==
- Sociology is banned by communist authorities in China and is labeled as a bourgeois pseudoscience.
- Hans Jurgen Eysenck's Scientific Study of Personality is published.
- Melville J. Herskovits's Economic Anthropology: A study in Comparative Economics is published.
- Robert E. Park's Human Communities is published.
- Talcott Parsons' and Edward Shils' Towards a general theory of action is published.
- Philippine Sociological Society is founded as a non-stock, non-profit professional association that is registered with the Securities and Exchange Commission.
- Alfred Radcliffe-Brown's The Structure and Function of primitive society is published.
- Dorothy Swaine Thomas' The Salvage is published.
- Dorothy Swaine Thomas serves as the first woman president of the American Sociological Association.

== 1953 ==
- Morris Ginsberg's The Idea of Progress: A Revaluation is published.
- Morris Ginsberg's On the Diversity of Morals is published.
- Alfred Kinsey's Sexual Behaviour in the Human Female is published.
- C. Wright Mills' Character and Social Structure is published.
- Ludwig Wittgenstein's Philosophical Investigations is published.
- Max Weber's The Sociology of Religion is published.
- Samuel A. Stouffer serves as president of the ASA.

== 1954 ==
- Lewis Coser's The Functions of Social Conflict is published.
- Hans Jurgen Eysenck's Psychology of Politics is published.
- David Glass' Social Mobility in Britain is published.
- David Glass' Trend and Pattern of Fertility in Britain is published.
- Alvin Ward Gouldner's Patterns of Industrial Bureaucracy is published.
- Edmund Leach's Political Systems of Highland Burma is published.
- C. Wright Mills' Mass Society and Liberal Education is published.
- Siegfried Frederick Nadel's Nupe Religion is published.
- Talcott Parsons' Essays in Sociological Theory is published.
- Florian Znaniecki serves as president of the American Sociological Association.
- Thomas Humphrey Marshall becomes Chair of Sociology at the LSE

== 1955 ==
- Theodor Adorno's Prisms is published.
- Gordon Allport's Becoming is published.
- Milovan Djilas' The New Class is published.
- Lucien Goldmann's The Hidden God; a study of Pascal and Racine is published.
- Louis Hartz's The Liberal Tradition in America
- George Alexander Kelly's The Psychology of Personal Constructs is published.
- Paul Lazarsfeld's Personal Influence is published.
- Herbert Marcuse's Eros and Civilization is published.
- Joan Woodward's The Dockworker is published.
- Barbara Wootton's Foundations of Wage Policy is published.
- Leopold Von Wiese retires as chairperson of the German Society for Sociology and is succeeded by Helmuth Plessner.

== 1956 ==
- Vere Gordon Childe's Man Makes Himself is published.
- Viola Klein's and Alva Myrdal's Women's Two Roles: Home and Work is published.
- David Lockwood's Some Remarks on "The Social System" is published.
- Charles Wright Mills's The Power Elite is published.
- Pitirim Sorokin's Fads and Foibles in Modern Sociology and Related Sciences is published.
- Otto Stammer's Functions in the Party Unit is published.
- Asher Tropp's School teachers : the growth of the teaching profession in England and Wales from 1800 to the present day is published.
- Max Weber's The Soteriology of the Underprivileged is published.
- November 4 - The use of force by the Soviet Union to destroy the Hungarian Uprising turns many doctrinal Marxists away from the Marxist-Leninist model.

== 1957 ==
- Hans Jurgen Eysenck's Dynamics of Anxiety and Hysteria is published.
- Edward Franklin Frazier's Black Bourgeoisie is published.
- Terrence Morris's The Criminal Area: A study in Ecology is published.
- Stanislaw Ossowski's Class Structure in the Social Consciousness is published.
- Karl Polanyi's Trade and Markets in the Early Empires is published.
- Karl Popper's The Poverty of Historicism is published.
- Alfred Radcliffe-Brown's A Natural Science of Society is published.
- Jean-Paul Sartre's The Problem of Method is published.
- Victor Turner's Schism and Continuity in an African Society is published.
- Karl Wittfogel's Oriental Despotism: A Comparative Study of Total Power is published.
- Michael Young's and Peter Willmott's Family and Kinship in East London
- Revised edition of Robert K. Merton's Social Theory and Social Structure is published.
- Robert K. Merton serves as president of the ASA.

== 1958 ==
- Simone de Beauvoir's The Memoirs of a Dutiful Daughter is published.
- Georges Gurvitch's The Spectrum of Time is published.
- Fritz Heider's The Psychology of Interpersonal Relations is published.
- David Lockwood's Blackcoated worker : a study in class consciousness is published.
- Helen Merrell Lynd's On Shame and the Search for Identity is published.
- C. Wright Mills's The Causes of World War 3 is published.
- Gunnar Myrdal's Beyond the Welfare State is published.
- Irene B. Taeuber's The Population of Japan is published.
- Richard Titmuss' Essays on the Welfare State is published.
- Michael Young's The Rise of the Meritocracy, 1870–2023: An Essay On Education and Equality is published.
- The Jewish Journal of Sociology is established in London, Maurice Freedman becomes the first editor.

== 1959 ==
- Oliver Cox's Foundations of Capitalism is published.
- Ralf Dahrendorf's Class and Class Conflict in an Industrial Society is published.
- Ernest Gellner's Words and Things is published.
- Erving Goffman's Presentation of Self in Everyday Life is published.
- Morris Janowitz's Sociology and the Military Establishment is published.
- Oscar Lewis' Five Families; Mexican Case Studies In The Culture Of Poverty is published.
- C. Wright Mills's The Sociological Imagination is published.
- Geoffrey Duncan Mitchell's Sociology : the study of social systems is published.
- Karl Popper's The Logic of Scientific Discovery is published.
- Barbara Wootton's Social Science and Social Pathology is published.
- Kingsley Davis serves as president of ASA.
- Barbara Wootton becomes president of the British Sociological Association.
- Helmuth Plessner retires as chairperson of the German Society for Sociology and is succeeded by Theodor Adorno

=== Deaths ===
- April 27: William F. Ogburn
- May 20: Alfred Schütz

== See also ==
- Interpretations of Weber's liberalism
- Social Problems (journal)
