= 1940s in anthropology =

- 1930s
- 1940s in anthropology
- 1950s
Other topics in 1940s:
- Comics
- Fashion
- Motorsport
- Music
- Science and technology
- Sociology
- Television

The Timeline of anthropology, 1940–1949, follow. This decade, during which World War II was fought, was critical for the publication of a number of important works in anthropology. A number of notable anthropologists were born during the Baby Boom Generation that started in 1945.

== Events ==
1940

- The oldest known North American mummy, Spirit Cave Man, is excavated
- Prehistoric paintings in the Lascaux caves are discovered

1949

- The Human Relations Area Files (HRAF) is founded at Yale University

== Publications ==
1940

- Race, Language and Culture, by Franz Boas
- African Political Systems, ed. by Meyer Fortes and E. E. Evans-Pritchard

1944

- The People of Alor by Cora Du Bois
- Configurations of Culture Growth by Alfred Kroeber
- The Great Transformation by Karl Polanyi

1949

- The Hero with a Thousand Faces, by Joseph Campbell
- Les structures élémentaires de la parenté (The Elementary Structures of Kinship), by Claude Lévi-Strauss

== Births ==
1940

- Michael Taussig
- Bruce Kapferer

1941

- H. James Birx
- Richard Dawkins

1942

- Yoram Bilu
- Ulf Hannerz
- Meave Leakey

1943

- Eduardo Archetti

1944

- Richard Leakey
- Nancy Scheper-Hughes

1948

- Kirsten Hastrup
- Ian Hodder
- Tim Ingold
- David Kertzer

1949

- Steven Feld
- Ian Hodder

== Deaths ==
1940

- James Frazer
- Alexander Goldenweiser
- Alfred Cort Haddon
- Charles Seligman

1941

- Carl Vilhelm Hartman
- Elsie Clews Parsons
- Benjamin Whorf

1942

- Franz Boas
- Bronislaw Malinowski

1943

- Mark Cohen
- Katsuyoshi Fukui
- Aleš Hrdlička
- Donald Johanson

1948

- Ruth Benedict
