= 1950s in anthropology =

- 1940s
- 1950s in anthropology
- 1960s
Other topics in 1950s:
- Comics
- Fashion
- Motorsport
- Music
- Science and technology
- Sociology
- Television

Timeline of anthropology, 1950–1959 is below. Women first started to have success within the academic community of anthropology in this decade.

== Events ==
- Margaret Mead was curator of ethnology at the American Museum of Natural History throughout the 1950s, and starting in 1954, taught at The New School and Columbia University, where she was an adjunct professor.

1959

- Mary Leakey discovers the first Paranthropus boisei cranium

== Publications ==
1956

- Nuer Religion by E. E. Evans-Pritchard

1959

- Political Leadership Among Swat Pathans, by Fredrik Barth
- The Inland Whale, by Theodora Kroeber

== Deaths ==
1956

- Marcel Griaule
- F.W. Hodge
- Rafael Karsten
- Siegfried Nadel

1959

- Edward Winslow Gifford
- Paul Radin
