= Joanna Woodward =

Joanna Woodward may refer to:

- JoWonder, born Joanna Woodward, British artist and writer
- Joanna Woodward (actress) (born 1988), English actress
- Joanne Woodward (born 1930), American actress

== See also ==
- Joan Woodward (1916–1971), British professor in industrial sociology and organizational studies
