= 1950s in comics =

- 1940s
- 1950s in comics
- 1960s
Other topics in 1950s:
- Anthropology
- Fashion
- Motorsport
- Music
- Science and technology
- Sociology
- Television

See also: 1940s in comics, other events of the 1950s, 1960s in comics and the list of years in comics

Publications: 1950 - 1951 - 1952 - 1953 - 1954 - 1955 - 1956 - 1957 - 1958 - 1959

== Publications ==
=== 1950 ===
- Adventures into Terror #43 - Marvel Comics
- Amazing Detective Cases #3 spin-off from Suspense - Marvel Comics
- Apache Kid #1 - Marvel Comics
- Black Rider #8 renamed from Western Winners - Marvel Comics
- Cindy Smith #39 renamed from Cindy Comics - Marvel Comics
- Crime Can't Win #41 renamed from Cindy Smith - Marvel Comics
- Crime Can't Win #4 renumbered from #44 - Marvel Comics
- Crime Exposed #1 - Marvel Comics
- Crime Must Lose! #4 renamed from Romantic Affairs - Marvel Comics
- Cowgirl Romances #28 renamed from Jeanie Comics - Marvel Comics
- Gunhawk, The #12 renamed from Whip Wilson - Marvel Comics
- Hedy of Hollywood #36 renamed from Hedy de Vine - Marvel Comics
- Honeymoon #41 renamed from Gay Comics - Marvel Comics
- It's a Ducks Life #1 - Marvel Comics
- Journey into Unknown Worlds #36 renamed from Teen Comics - Marvel Comics
- Kellys, The #23 renamed from Rusty Comics - Marvel Comics
- Marvel Boy #1 - Marvel Comics
- Men's Adventures #4 renamed from True Adventures - Marvel Comics
- My Friend Irma #3 renamed from My Diary (comics) - Marvel Comics
- Romantic Affairs #3 renamed from Romances of the West - Marvel Comics
- Sports Action #2 renamed from Sports Stars - Marvel Comics
- Real Experiences #25 renamed from Tiny Tessie - Marvel Comics
- Reno Browne, Hollywood's Greatest Cowgirl #50 renamed from Margie Comics - Marvel Comics
- Romantic Affairs #4 renamed from Romances of the West - Marvel Comics
- Spy Cases #26 renamed from Kellys, The - Marvel Comics
- Spy Cases #4 renumbered from #29 - Marvel Comics
- True Adventures #3 renamed from True Western - Marvel Comics
- True Life Tales #2 renumbered from #9 - Marvel Comics
- True Secrets #3 renamed from Our Love - Marvel Comics
- Two-Gun Western #5 renamed from Casey Crime Photographer - Marvel Comics
- War Comics #1 - Marvel Comics
- Whip Wilson #9 renamed from Rex Hart - Marvel Comics
- Young Men #4 renamed from Cowboy Romances - Marvel Comics

=== 1951 ===
- Adventures into Terror #3 renumbered from #45 - Marvel Comics
- Arizona Kid #1 - Marvel Comics
- Astonishing #3 renamed from Marvel Boy - Marvel Comics
- Battle #1 - Marvel Comics
- Combat Kelly #1 - Marvel Comics
- Fightin' Marines #1-176 changes publisher to Charlton in 1955- St. John
- Crime Cases Private Eye #1 - Marvel Comics
- Journey into Unknown Worlds #4 renamed from #39 - Marvel Comics
- Mystic #1 - Marvel Comics
- Kent Blake of the Secret Service #1 - Marvel Comics
- Rocky Jorden Private Eye #6 renamed from Crime Cases Private Eye - Marvel Comics
- Young Men on the Battlefield #4 renamed from Young Men - Marvel Comics
- Red Warrior #1 - Marvel Comics
- Space Squadron #1 - Marvel Comics
- Spy Fighters #1 - Marvel Comics
- Strange Tales #1 - Marvel Comics
- Texas Kid #1 - Marvel Comics

=== 1952 ===
- Actual Confessions #13 renamed from Lova Adventures - Marvel Comics
- Adventures into Weird Worlds #1 - Marvel Comics
- Battle Action #1 - Marvel Comics
- Battlefield #1 - Marvel Comics
- Battlefront #1 - Marvel Comics
- Combat #1 - Marvel Comics
- Fighting Leathernecks #1-6 renamed United States Marines - Toby Press
- Girl Confessions #13 renamed from Girl Comics - Marvel Comics
- Journey into Mystery #1 - Marvel Comics
- Men in Action #1 - Marvel Comics
- Mystery Tales #1 - Marvel Comics
- Patsy and Hedy #1 - Marvel Comics
- Space World #6 renamed from Space Squadron - Marvel Comics
- Spellbound #1 - Marvel Comics
- Tell It to the Marines #1-16 changes publisher to I.W. Enterprises in 1964, also see Tell It to the Marines Super - Toby Press
- U.S. Marines in Action #1-3 - Avon Periodicals
- Uncanny Tales #1 - Marvel Comics
- War Action #1 - Marvel Comics
- War Adventures #1 - Marvel Comics
- War Combat #1 - Marvel Comics

=== 1953 ===
- Battle Brady #10 renamed from Men in Action - Marvel Comics
- Bible Tales for Young Folk #1 - Marvel Comics
- Bible Tales for Young People #3 renamed from Bible Tales for Young Folk - Marvel Comics
- Buck Duck #1 - Marvel Comics
- Combat Casey #6 renamed from War Combat - Marvel Comics
- Crazy #1 - Marvel Comics
- Homer Hooper #1 - Marvel Comics
- Little Lizzie #1 - Marvel Comics
- Lorna the Jungle Queen #1 - Marvel Comics
- Menace #1 - Marvel Comics
- Miss America #50 renamed from Miss America Magazine - Marvel Comics
- Monkey and the Bear, The #1 - Marvel Comics
- Patsy and her Pals #1 - Marvel Comics
- Princess Knight, by Osamu Tezuka, is first serialized on Kodansha's Shōjo Club
- Secret Story Romances #1 - Marvel Comics
- Speed Carter, Spaceman #1 - Marvel Comics
- The Topper #1 - D.C. Thomson and Co. Ltd
- United States Marines #7-11 renamed from Fighting Leathernecks - Toby Press
- Wendy Parker Comics #1 - Marvel Comics
- Young Men #21 renamed from Young Men on the Battlefield - Marvel Comics
- Young Men in Action #24 renamed from Young Men - Marvel Comics

=== 1954 ===
- Arrowhead #1 - Marvel Comics
- Battle Ground #1 - Marvel Comics
- Crime Fighters Always Win #11 renamed from Crimefighters - Marvel Comics
- Girl's Life #1 - Marvel Comics
- Jungle Action #1 - Marvel Comics
- Jungle Tales #1 - Marvel Comics
- Lorna the Jungle Girl #6 renamed from Lorna the Jungle Queen - Marvel Comics
- Marines in Battle #1-25 - Atlas Comics
- Navy Action #1 - Marvel Comics
- Outlaw Fighters #1 - Marvel Comics
- Outlaw Kid #1 - Marvel Comics
- Police Action #1 - Marvel Comics
- Ringo Kid Western, The #1 - Marvel Comics
- Riot #1 - Marvel Comics
- Rugged Action #1 - Marvel Comics
- Semper Fi #1-9 - Marvel Comics
- Spy Thrillers #1 - Marvel Comics
- Western Kid #1 - Marvel Comics
- Western Outlaws #1 - Marvel Comics
- Western Thrillers #1 - Marvel Comics
- Wild #1 - Marvel Comics
- With the Marines on the Battlefronts of the World #1-2 - Toby Press

=== 1955 ===
- Adventures of Pinky Lee, The #1 - Marvel Comics
- Billy Buckskin Western #1 - Marvel Comics
- Black Knight. The #1 - Marvel Comics
- Cowboy Action #5 renamed from Western Thrillers - Marvel Comics
- Della Vision #1 - Marvel Comics
- Gunsmoke Western #32 renamed from Western Tales of Black Rider - Marvel Comics
- Homer the Happy Ghost #1 - Marvel Comics
- Jann of the Jungle #8 renamed from Jungle Tales - Marvel Comics
- Marines in Action #1-14 - Atlas Comics
- Meet Miss Bliss #1 - Marvel Comics
- My Girl Pearl #1 - Marvel Comics
- Navy Combat #1 - Marvel Comics
- Patty Powers #4 renamed from Della Vision - Marvel Comics
- Police Badge#749 #5 renamed from Spy Thrillers - Marvel Comics
- Rawhide Kid #1 - Marvel Comics
- Strange Stories of Suspense #5 renamed from Rugged Action - Marvel Comics
- Strange Tales of the Unusual #1 - Marvel Comics
- Western Tales of Black Rider #28 renamed from Black Rider - Marvel Comics
- Wyatt Earp #1 - Marvel Comics

=== 1956 ===
- Adventure into Mystery #1 - Marvel Comics
- Caught #1 - Marvel Comics
- Date with Millie, A #1 - Marvel Comics
- Devil-Dog Dugan #1-3 renamed Tales of the Marines - Atlas Comics
- Frontier Western #1 - Marvel Comics
- Matt Slade, Gunfighter #1 - Marvel Comics
- Melvin the Monster #1 - Marvel Comics
- My Love Story #1 - Marvel Comics
- Mystical Tales #1 - Marvel Comics
- Quick Trigger Western Action #12 renamed from Cowboy Action - Marvel Comics
- Quick Trigger Western #13 renamed from Quick Trigger Western Action - Marvel Comics
- Sailor Sweeney #12 renamed from Navy Action - Marvel Comics
- Sgt. Barney Barker #1 - Marvel Comics
- Sherry the Showgirl #1 - Marvel Comics
- Stories of Romance #5 renamed from Meet Miss Bliss - Marvel Comics
- True Tales of Love #22 renamed from Secret Story Romances - Marvel Comics
- Two-Gun Western #4 renamed from Billy Buckskin Western - Marvel Comics
- Western Gunfighters #20 renamed from Apache Kid - Marvel Comics
- World of Fantasy #1 - Marvel Comics
- World of Mystery #1 - Marvel Comics
- World of Suspense #1 - Marvel Comics
- Yellow Claw #1 - Marvel Comics

=== 1957 ===
- Adventures of Homer Ghost #1 - Marvel Comics
- Black Rider Rides Again, The #1 - Marvel Comics
- Commando Adventures #1 - Marvel Comics
- Date with Patsy, A #1 - Marvel Comics
- Dexter the Demon #7 renamed from Melvin the Monster - Marvel Comics
- G.I. Tales #4 renamed from Sgt. Barney Barker - Marvel Comics
- Hedy Wolfe #1 - Marvel Comics
- Kid from Dodge City, The #1 - Marvel Comics
- Kid from Texas, The #1 - Marvel Comics
- Marines at War #1-8 renamed from Tales of the Marines - Atlas Comics
- Marvin Mouse #1 - Marvel Comics
- Kid Slade, Gunfighter #5 renamed from Matt Slade, Gunfighter - Marvel Comics
- Navy Action #15 renamed from Sailor Sweeney - Marvel Comics
- Navy Tales #1 - Marvel Comics
- Nellie the Nurse #1 - Marvel Comics
- Showgirls #4 renamed from Sherry the Showgirl - Marvel Comics
- Sherry the Showgirl #5 renamed from Showgirls - Marvel Comics
- Showgirls #1 - Marvel Comics
- Six-Gun Western #1 - Marvel Comics
- Tales of the Marines #4 renamed Marines at War renamed from Devil-Dog Dugan - Atlas Comics
- Western Trails #1 - Marvel Comics
- Willie the Wise Guy #1 - Marvel Comics

=== 1958 ===
- Strange Worlds #1 - Marvel Comics
- Tell It to the Marines Super #1 also see Tell It to the Marines - I.W. Enterprises

==== August ====
- August 13: Jack Cole dies at age 43.

=== 1959 ===
- Kathy #1 - Marvel Comics
- Date with Millie, A #1 - Marvel Comics
- Tales of Suspense #1 - Marvel Comics
- Tales to Astonish #1 - Marvel Comics
