= 1960s in motorsport =

Decade in motorsports

- 1950s
- 1960s in motorsport
- 1970s
Other topics in 1960s:
- Anthropology
- Comics
- Fashion
- Music
- Science and technology
- Sociology
- Television

This article documents the events that occurred in motorsports in the 1960s.

== United States ==
- The Grand National continues to see popularity as muscle cars come into popularity.
- Due to the rise of pony cars such as the Ford Mustang, a new series is created known as the Trans-American Sedan Championship, featuring all pony cars with a maximum five liter (302ci) displacement limit.
- Also established is a prototype-based Canadian-American Challenge Cup
- The Indianapolis 500 becomes an independent race, separating from Formula One. The United States Grand Prix replaces it, being held at Watkins Glen.
- The United States is heavily competitive in the World Sports Car Championship due to the innovative Corvette Stingray, Shelby Cobra, and Ford GT40. The GT40 would prove to be a major success in the 24 Hours of Le Mans, winning it four consecutive times.
- Racing legend Jim Hall establishes Chaparral Cars, a highly innovative team in the Can Am Series.
- Racing legend Caroll Shelby establishes Shelby Motors, bringing to racing the famous Cobra and Daytona.
- Formula 5000 is established based on F1, but using five liter engines instead of the three from Formula One. It is also sanctioned by the SCCA, not the FIA, so it only uses North American venues.
- The International Motor Sports Association is established
- The United States Road Racing Championship is established. It would later partially evolve into Trans Am and Can Am.
- The 24 Hours of Daytona is first held
- The Pontiac GTO is introduced, the first muscle car
- Sports car legend Mark Donohue debuts in Trans Am
- Debut of racing legend Mario Andretti
- Talladega Superspeedway opens
- Chrysler introduces the Dodge Charger Daytona and Plymouth Superbird in an attempt to become more competitive in NASCAR. 500 units of the Charger are built, with the final being dubbed the Daytona 500, in order to be legally called a production car.
- Ford introduces its line of performances cars: the Ford Falcon, the Ford Torino, and the Ford Torino Talladega are among them.
- Chevrolet introduces the Chevrolet Nova
- The Thunderbird is redesigned to be more aerodynamic and thus more competitive.
- NASCAR returns to Bridgehampton Race Circuit for a few years.

== North America ==
- The Canadian Grand Prix is first held.

== Europe ==
- The successful development category Formula Ford first raced in 1966.
- The Porsche 911 is first introduced. It will over time become a very successful grand tourer, but is first entered as a touring car in the Trans Am Series.
- The BMW New Class is introduced. It would go on to become competitive in touring car racing and the IMSA GT Championship
- The Lotus Cortina is introduced. It becomes a successful touring car.
- The Opel Kadett becomes successful in touring car racing.
- The Alfa Romeo Giulia is introduced. It becomes a successful touring car.
- Formula One increases the displacement limit from 1.5 liters to 3, beginning what is considered by many to be a golden age
- Debut of racing legend Jacky Ickx
- Debut of racing legend Jackie Stewart
- The Jaguar E-Type debuts
- The Ferrari Dino is introduced
- The Porsche 908 debuts
- The MG B is introduced

== Australia ==
The Australian Touring Car Championship was first held in 1960.

== South America ==
- The Mexican Grand Prix is first held.
- The Baja 1000 is first held.

== Africa ==
The South African Grand Prix is first held. It will continue until 1986.

== Asia ==
- Japanese manufacturer Datsun becomes competitive in motorsport with the Datsun 510 in touring car racing.
- Nissan introduces the Datsun 240Z, beginning the Z-car line.

== See also ==
- 1950s in motorsport
- 1970s in motorsport
- Brighton and Hove Albion
