= 1940s in motorsport =

- 1940s in motorsport
- 1950s
Other topics in 1940s:
- Anthropology
- Comics
- Fashion
- Music
- Science and technology
- Sociology
- Television

This article documents the status of motorsports in the 1940s.

== North America ==
- Due to the popularity of sedan racing, a professional racing series known as the Strictly Stock Series is established. In contrast to the hot rod racing popular in the US, this new series uses unmodified "stock cars". The series quickly becomes popular throughout the country.
- The Sports Car Club of America is founded
- Oldsmobile introduces the 88, later to become competitive in racing and the subject of the famous rock and roll song Rocket 88
- Racing legend Sam Posey is born
- Racing legend Mario Andretti is born
- The original Daytona Beach Road Course is established out of the new Strictly Stock Series. It quickly becomes one of the staples of the series until it closes about a decade later.

== Europe ==
Racing legend Jacky Ickx is born.

== See also ==
- 1930s in motorsport
- 1950s in motorsport
