= 1950s in motorsport =

- 1940s
- 1950s in motorsport
- 1960s
Other topics in 1950s:
- Anthropology
- Comics
- Fashion
- Music
- Science and technology
- Sociology
- Television

This article documents the status of motorsports in the 1950s.

== United States ==
- Due to the rising popularity of stock car racing, the new Strictly Stock Series is established as the Grand National. The series becomes phenomenally popular, and attracts numerous domestic manufacturers.
- The Chevrolet Corvette and Ford Thunderbird become the first true American sports cars. Late in the decade, the Corvette would adopt a V8 engine and become heavily competitive in endurance racing.
- The Indianapolis 500 is added to the new grand prix schedule. It is later replaced with a United States Grand Prix in 1959.
- Racing legend Phil Hill debuts in 1958.
- The SCCA National Sports Car Championship was first contested in 1951, America's first championship for sports cars.
- The Twelve Hours of Sebring is first held
- NASCAR legend Richard Petty debuts
- Debut of racing legend A. J. Foyt in IndyCar
- The Hudson Hornet is dominant in NASCAR
- The National Hot Rod Association is founded as a professional organization for drag racing
- Daytona International Speedway opens
- Riverside International Raceway opens. It will last until the 1980s when it will close
- Laguna Seca Raceway opens
- The original Daytona Beach Road Course closes

== Europe ==
- Grand prix racing returns after World War II temporarily halts automobile production. The new grand prix series is known as Formula One.
- The debut of racing legend Stirling Moss.
- The establishment of the World Sports Car Championship, composed mainly of endurance races such as the 24 Hours of Le Mans.
- The beginnings of the British Saloon Car Championship, now the British Touring Car Championship.
- The Mille Miglia is last held after thirty years.
- The Portuguese Grand Prix debuts in 1958
- The Dutch Grand Prix is first held in 1955
- The Spanish Grand Prix is first held in 1951
- The Porsche 550 Spyder and Porsche 356 are introduced, competitive in motorsport
- The Maserati Birdcage is introduced as a competitive racing prototype
- The Jaguar D-Type is introduced as a competitive racecar
- The Lotus Eleven is introduced for motorsport
- The original Mini debuts. It is competitive in touring car racing.
- The original Volkswagen Beetle debuts, becoming competitive in touring car racing
- The Triumph TR is introduced
- The MG A is introduced
- Dino is introduced as a brand of Ferrari
- Juan Manuel Fangio wins a then-record five Formula One drivers championships, driving for Alfa Romeo

== Australia ==
- The rise of famous racer and race car builder Jack Brabham.

== South America ==
- The Carrera Panamericana is held from 1950 to 1954
- The Argentine Grand Prix debuts in 1953 as the first F1 race in South America

== Africa ==
- The Moroccan Grand Prix, the first F1 race to be held in Africa, is held in 1958

== See also ==
- 1940s in motorsport
- 1960s in motorsport
