= 1960s in comics =

- 1950s
- 1960s in comics
- 1970s
Other topics in 1960s:
- Anthropology
- Fashion
- Motorsport
- Music
- Science and technology
- Sociology
- Television

See also: 1950s in comics, other events of the 1960s, 1970s in comics and the list of years in comics

== Events and publications ==
=== 1960 ===
==== July ====
- House of Mystery #100, edited by Jack Schiff. (DC Comics)

=== 1961 ===
- Amazing Adventures #1 - Marvel Comics
- Fantastic Four #1 - Marvel Comics

=== 1962 ===
- Amazing Fantasy #15 renamed from Amazing Adult Fantasy - Marvel Comics (last issue)
  - First appearance of Spider-Man
- Incredible Hulk #1 - Marvel Comics
- Strange Tales Annual #1 - Marvel Comics

=== 1963 ===
- The Amazing Spider-Man #1 - Marvel Comics
- Avengers #1 - Marvel Comics
- Fantastic Four Annual #1 - Marvel Comics
- Sgt. Fury and his Howling Commandos #1 - Marvel Comics
- Uncanny X-Men #1 -[Marvel Comics

=== 1964 ===
- The Amazing Spider-Man Annual #1 - Marvel Comics
- Daredevil #1 - Marvel Comics
- Marine War Heroes #1-18 - Charlton
- Marines Attack #1-9 - Charlton
- Marvel Tales Annual #1 - Marvel Comics

=== 1965 ===
- Journey into Mystery Annual #1 - Marvel Comics
- Marvel Collector's Item Classics #1 - Marvel Comics
- Sgt. Fury and his Howling Commandos Annual #1 - Marvel Comics

=== 1966 ===
- Sally the Witch, by Mitsuteru Yokoyama, is first serialized on Ribon.

==== March ====
- Tales to Astonish #77: "Bruce Banner is the Hulk," drawn by John Romita (Marvel Comics)
- Black Fury, with issue #57 (March /April cover-date), canceled by Charlton.

==== April ====
- April 28: Tarzan artist Jesse Marsh passes away at age 58.

==== May ====
- Daredevil #16 (Marvel Comics): "Enter Spider-Man," drawn by John Romita
- Ghostly Tales #1 (Charlton)

==== June ====
- First appearance of Poison Ivy in Batman #181 (DC Comics).

==== July ====
- Marvel Tales #3 renamed from Marvel Tales Annual (Marvel Comics)

==== August ====
- The Amazing Spider-Man #39 (Marvel Comics): "How Green Was My Goblin"

==== September ====
- The Amazing Spider-Man #40 (Marvel Comics): "Spidey Saves The Day"
- Thor Annual #2 renamed from Journey into Mystery Annual (Marvel Comics)
- With issue #110, DC Comics suspends publication of Mystery in Space (1951 series); the title is temporarily revived in 1980.

==== November ====
- The Flash #165: Barry Allen marries Iris West (DC Comics).

=== 1967 ===
==== January ====
- Batgirl debuts in Detective Comics #359. The issue was titled "The Million Dollar Debut of Batgirl" and was written by Gardner Fox and illustrated by Carmine Infantino (DC Comics)

==== December ====
- Mac Raboy dies at age 53.

=== 1968 ===
- Zap Comix #1 self-published; begins the underground comix movement

=== 1969 ===
- The Golden Age character Phantom Stranger makes his first Silver Age appearance in Showcase #80.

==== July ====
- Long-time DC Comics logo designer and letterer Ira Schnapp dies at age 76.

==== September ====
- Classics Illustrated cartoonist Alex Blum dies at age 80.
