= Carl C. Taylor =

American softball coach

Carl Taylor
Current position
- Title: Volunteer assistant coach
- Team: Fairleigh Dickinson
- Conference: NEC
- Record: 111–144–3 (.436)

Biographical details
- Education: New Mexico Highlands University

Coaching career (HC unless noted)
- 1995-2007: Rutgers-Camden
- 2008: Georgian Court University (asst.)
- 2009: Philadelphia Force (asst.)
- 2011-2014: Winslow HS (NJ)
- 2015: Drexel (Interim)
- 2016-2021: Drexel

Head coaching record
- Overall: 111–144–3 (.436)
- Tournaments: NCAA: – (–)

Carl C. Taylor is an American softball coach, that is the volunteer assistant coach at Fairleigh Dickinson. He was the head coach of Drexel until June 2021. He was the first coach in Rutgers University history to win a national championship when he led the 2006 Rutgers-Camden Softball team to national championship victory in Raleigh, North Carolina, defeating the reigning National Champions, University of St. Thomas.

== Biography ==
After the 2007 season Taylor retired after 12 years as Rutgers-Camden's head softball coach. He was also drafted in the third round of the Major League Baseball draft in 1979 by the Pittsburgh Pirates, but did not play in a Major League game. In January 1981 he was signed by the Dodgers.

== Coaching career ==
=== Drexel ===
On June 22, 2015, Taylor was announced as the new head coach of the Drexel softball program.

== Head coaching record ==
=== College ===
Record table
Season	Team	Overall	Conference	Standing	Postseason
Drexel Dragons (Colonial Athletic Association) (2015–Present)
2015	Drexel	19-23	6-13	6th	
2016	Drexel	20-35	0-19	8th	
2017	Drexel	19-30	4-16	8th	
2018	Drexel	21-29-2	3-18	8th	
2019	Drexel	32-27-1	9-12	T-4th	
2020	Drexel				
Drexel:		111–144–3 (.436)	22–78 (.220)		
Total:		111–144–3 (.436)			
National champion Postseason invitational champion Conference regular season champion Conference regular season and conference tournament champion Division regular season champion Division regular season and conference tournament champion Conference tournament champion
