= 1960s in anthropology =

- 1950s
- 1960s in anthropology
- 1970s
Other topics in 1960s:
- Comics
- Fashion
- Music
- Science and technology
- Sociology
- Television

Timeline of anthropology, 1960–1969

== Events ==
- The Southern Anthropological Society is founded.

== Publications ==
1960

- Worker In The Cane; A Puerto Rican Life History by Sidney Mintz

1961

- Ishi in Two Worlds, by Theodora Kroeber
- Rethinking Anthropology, by Edmund Leach
- The Forest People, by Colin Turnbull

== Deaths ==
1960

- John Sydenham Furnivall
- Zora Neale Hurston
- Clyde Kluckhohn
- Alfred L. Kroeber

1961

- Frantz Fanon
- John Peabody Harrington
