= Mark Nathan Cohen =

American anthropologist

Mark Nathan Cohen (born 24 May 1943) is an American anthropologist and a professor in the State University of New York. He has an A.B. degree from Harvard College (1965) and a Ph.D. degree in anthropology (Columbia University, 1971). His areas of research and teaching include human evolution and demographic history, cultural evolution, biology, medical care and forensic anthropology. He has written several books in the field of population growth and life expectancy. He has written and spoken out repeatedly about inequality and race in America. He is both university distinguished professor emeritus and distinguished teaching professor emeritus of the State University of New York

== Bibliography ==
Among other books, he has authored:

- Health and the Rise of Civilization (Yale University Press, 1989)
- Paleopathology at the Origins of Agriculture (Academic Press 1984)
- Culture of Intolerance (Yale University Press 1998)
- Ancient Health (University Press of Florida 2007)
- Darwin and the Bible (Pearson Education and Allyn & Bacon 2008)
- The Food Crisis in Prehistory (Yale University Press 1977)
- Biosocial Mechanisms of Population Regulation (Yale University Press 1980)
