= Richard Machalek =

Richard Machalek (born April 12, 1946) is a social theorist, sociobiologist, and professor of sociology. He is emeritus faculty of sociology at the University of Wyoming.

A student and colleague of sociobiologist E.O. Wilson, Machalek is best known for using traditional sociological frameworks and theories to explain complex social behavior and structures in non-human societies, with a special emphasis on ant populations.

Machalek believes that the bedrock of sociological knowledge lies in explaining social phenomena that are exhibited across many different types of species. Machalek also applies knowledge from the fields of evolutionary theory, zoology, and biology and is especially concerned with the trans-species social behaviors of cheating, cooperation, and division of labor, among others.

== See also ==
- E.O. Wilson
- Sociobiology
- Evolutionary psychology
