= Arnold Marshall Rose =

American politician

- Born: July 2, 1918; Chicago, Illinois, United States
- Died: January 2, 1968 (aged 49); Minneapolis, Minnesota, United States
- Education: University of Chicago
- Scientific career
- Fields: Sociology
- Workplaces: University of Minnesota; Washington University in St. Louis; Bennington College

Arnold Marshall Rose (July 2, 1918 – January 2, 1968) was an American sociologist and politician. He was elected to the Minnesota Legislature and to the presidency of the American Sociological Association (ASA). He held faculty appointments at Bennington College, Washington University in St. Louis and the University of Minnesota. He had a special interest in the study of race relations.

== Biography ==
Born in Chicago in 1918, Rose earned several degrees from the University of Chicago, including undergraduate degrees in sociology and economics, then master's and doctoral degrees in sociology. He served in World War II in the Mediterranean Theater.

As a young man, he assisted Gunnar Myrdal on An American Dilemma: The Negro Problem and Modern Democracy. He worked at the University of Minnesota from 1949 until his death. He also wrote The Negro in America and The Power Struggle. Studying the issue of race relations, Rose found that racism presented four problems. It limited a society's access to talent and leadership, aggravated social issues like poverty, cost a society money and time to defend, and damaged goodwill between nations. He spent stints as a Fulbright Professor at the University of Paris and the University of Rome in the 1950s.

Rose was elected to a seat in the Minnesota Legislature in 1962. He did not seek another term because he had been diagnosed with cancer by 1966. Rose married sociologist and professor Caroline Baer in 1943. He died in January 1968, shortly after being elected president of the ASA but before beginning his term of office. The organization chose to recognize him as one of its presidents.

Caroline Baer Rose led the Council for University Women's Progress and the Midwest Sociological Society. She died of cancer in 1975.
