= Kirsten Hastrup =

Danish anthropologist and academic

Kirsten Blinkenberg Hastrup (born 1948) is a Danish anthropologist and professor of anthropology at the University of Copenhagen. She has taken a special interest in the conjunction between the history and culture of both Iceland and Greenland, publishing widely on both, while also examining the relationship between the theatre and anthropology. Hastrup was president of the Royal Danish Academy of Sciences and Letters from 2008 to 2016.

== Biography ==
Born on 20 February 1948 in Copenhagen, Hastrup is one of the five daughters of the physician Bent Faurschou Hastrup (1922–85) and his wife Else Blinkenberg, an educator. After matriculating from Aarhus Cathedral School in 1965, she studied geography and biology at Aarhus University. She went on to study ethnography at Copenhagen University, receiving an M.Sc. in 1973. The following year, she was awarded the university's gold medal for researching the woman's place in anthropology.

In 1968, she married her colleague Jan Ovesen, with whom she had four children. She moved with her children to Oxford University in 1974, embarking on a doctorate course which took her to Assam in India. She was unable to complete the assignment as the area was soon closed off to visitors as a result of political conflicts. She therefore decided to join the staff of Aarhus University in 1976, hoping to undertake field work in Iceland. She learnt Icelandic and studied the country's history, taking a special interest in the Middle Ages. With the agreement of Oxford, she wrote her thesis on Cultural Classification and History with Special Reference to Medieval Iceland (1979), earning a doctorate in 1980. The same year, her work led to the creation of historical anthropology as a new university subject in Denmark.

In 1982, she travelled to Iceland, where she spent half a year at the Árni Magnússon Institute for Icelandic Studies where she comprehensively researched Iceland's history from 1400 to 1800 for the first time, showing that the general decline over the period was a result of the Icelanders' own approach and own management rather than external factors as had previously been thought. She published her findings as Nature and Policy in Iceland 1400–1800 which ultimately earned her a second doctorate as dr.scient.soc or doctor of social sciences from the University of Copenhagen in 1990. She spent a further period carrying out field work on a farm and in a fishing village in Iceland, examining the relationship between the social history and cultural identity. Her work was documented in a trilogy covering Culture and History (1985), Nature and Policy (1990) and A Place Apart (1998). Hastrup also initiated a larger, two-year research project which led to the publication of Den nordiske verden (The Nordic World) in 1992.

From 1985 to 1990, Hastrup was a professor of research at Aarhus University where her work focused on the relationship between the theatre and anthropology. This led to the partly auto-biographical play Talabot presented at Holsterbro's Odin Teatret and at other locations worldwide over a three-year period. In 1990, she was appointed professor at the University of Copenhagen where she continued her interest in theatre, arranging a large conference on theatre anthropology. In 1966, she travelled to England to research the history of the Shakespearean theatre tradition in collaboration with the Royal Shakespeare Company. Her interest in the relationship between human structures and the process of change resulted in her appointment as the first head of research at the Danish Centre for Human Rights in 1998. This, in turn, led to her presidency of the Royal Danish Academy of Sciences and Letters from April 2008 to June 2016.

More recently, from 2009 to 2014, Hastrup ran Waterworlds, a major European research project analysing social responses to climate change, followed by fieldwork in Greenland, where she researched the effects of the modern world on a small community of hunters.

== Awards ==
Hastrup has received a number of awards including:

- 2010: Ebbe Munck Award for her biography of the polar explorer Knud Rasmussen
- 2012: Gad Rausing Award for outstanding humanitarian research from the Royal Swedish Academy of Letters, History and Antiquities

Hastrup is a Fellow of the British Academy and a member of the Norwegian Academy of Science and Letters

== Selected works ==
Hastrup has published some 40 books including:

- Hastrup, Kirsten (1985). Culture and History in Medieval Iceland: An Anthropological Analysis of Structure and Change. Clarendon Press. ISBN 978-0-19-823250-6.
- Hastrup, Kirsten (1990). Nature and Policy in Iceland, 1400-1800: An Anthropological Analysis of History and Mentality. Clarendon Press. ISBN 978-0-19-827728-6.
- Hastrup, Kirsten; Hervik, Peter (1994). Social Experience and Anthropological Knowledge. Routledge. ISBN 978-1-134-84389-3.
- Hastrup, Kirsten (1995). A Passage to Anthropology: Between Experience and Theory. Routledge. ISBN 978-1-135-10064-3.
- Hastrup, Kirsten; Olwig, Karen Fog (1997). Siting Culture: The Shifting Anthropological Object. Routledge. ISBN 978-1-134-74945-4.
- Hastrup, Kirsten (1998). A Place Apart: An Anthropological Study of the Icelandic World. Clarendon Press. ISBN 978-0-19-823380-0.
- Hastrup, Kirsten (2004). Action: Anthropology in the Company of Shakespeare. Museum Tusculanum Press. ISBN 978-87-7289-793-6.
- Hastrup, Kirsten (2013). Anthropology and Nature. Routledge. ISBN 978-1-134-46321-3.
- Hastrup, Kirsten; Rubow, Cecilie (2014). Living with Environmental Change: Waterworlds. Routledge. ISBN 978-1-317-75362-9.
