= George A. Lundberg =

American sociologist

George Andrew Lundberg
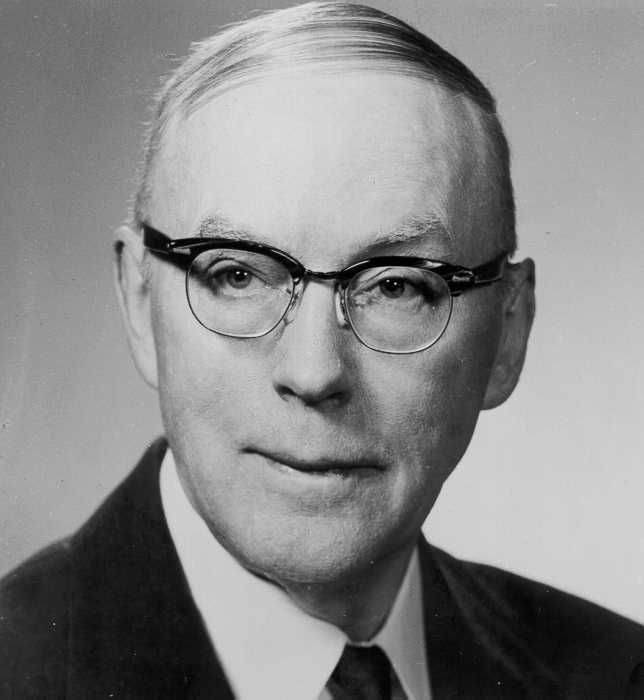
- Born: 3 October 1895; Fairdale, North Dakota, US
- Died: 14 April 1966 (aged 70); Seattle, Washington, US
- Education: University of North Dakota; University of Wisconsin; University of Minnesota
- Known for: President of American Sociological Society
- Scientific career
- Fields: Sociology

George Andrew Lundberg (October 3, 1895 – April 14, 1966) was an American sociologist.

== Background ==
Lundberg was born in Fairdale, North Dakota. His parents, Andrew J. Lundberg and Britta C. Erickson, were immigrants from Sweden. Lundberg received his bachelor's degree from the University of North Dakota in 1920, a master's degree from the University of Wisconsin in 1922, and a doctorate in 1925 from the University of Minnesota, where he studied under Luther Lee Bernard and F. Stuart Chapin.

== Career ==
Following his doctorate, he began a faculty position at the University of Washington, but left after a year for postdoctoral studies at Columbia University, and then took a position as an associate professor at the University of Pittsburgh. In 1930, he became director of the Bureau of Social Research at the Pittsburgh Federation of Social Agencies, but he soon left Pittsburgh for a faculty position at Columbia. In 1934 he worked with the Federal Emergency Relief Administration, and soon thereafter moved to Bennington College in Vermont, where he was professor of sociology and statistics. After holding additional faculty positions at the University of Minnesota, Brigham Young University, and Stanford University, he joined the University of Washington in 1945 as professor and chair, and remained there for the rest of his career.

Lundberg served at the 33rd President of the American Sociological Society. He was also president of the Pacific Sociological Association, the Eastern Sociological Society, and the Sociological Research Association, and was the editor of the journal Sociometry from 1941 to 1947.

Lundberg died on April 14, 1966, in Seattle, Washington, "following surgical treatment for a condition not ordinarily considered dangerous".

== Awards and honors ==
Lundberg was a Fellow of the American Association for the Advancement of Science, and was awarded the Distinguished Achievement Medal of the University of Minnesota and an honorary doctorate in 1958 from the University of North Dakota. After his death, a conference of the Pacific Sociological Association was held in his honor.

== Contributions ==
Lundberg's most lasting impression was made in his work entitled, Can Science Save Us?. However, Lundberg focused much of his research on the applications, limits, delimits, operational definitions, and linguistics. Lundberg's approach to sociology is usually categorized as neo-positivism. Lundberg was critical of the Chicago School of sociology. He felt that their methodologies were not precise enough to generate reliable results.

== Books ==
- Trends in American sociology (with Read Bain and Nels Anderson). Harper, 1929. Edited volume of a symposium of young sociologists.
- Social research : a study in methods of gathering data. Longmans, Green and Co., 1929. Reprinted 1942 and 1953. 2nd ed., Greenwood Press, 1968.
- Leisure: a suburban study (with Mirra Komarovsky and Mary Alice McInerny). Columbia University Press, 1934. Agathon Press, 1969.
- Foundations of sociology. The Macmillan Company, 1939; David McKay, 1964.
- Can science save us? Longmans, Green and Co., 1947.
- Sociology (with Otto N. Larsen and Clarence C. Schrag). Harper & Row, 1958; 4th ed., McGraw Hill, 1968.
