= Oliver Cox =

Trinidadian-American sociologist

- Born: August 24, 1901; Port of Spain, Trinidad
- Died: September 4, 1974 (aged 73)
- Education: Central YMCA High School, Chicago; C.S. Lewis Institute; Northwestern University Law (1928); U. Chicago Department of Economics M.A.(1932); U. Chicago Department of Sociology Ph.D. (1938)
- Notable work: Caste, Class, and Race: A Study in Social Dynamics, 1948; Foundations of Capitalism, 1959; Capitalism as a System, 1964; Race Relations: Elements and Social Dynamics, 1976

Oliver Cromwell Cox (24 August 1901 – 4 September 1974) was a Trinidadian-American sociologist. He was born into a middle-class family in Port of Spain, Trinidad and emigrated to the United States in 1919.

Cox was often misrepresented as a Marxist due to his focus on class conflict and capitalism; however, he fundamentally disagreed with Marx's analysis of capitalism. One of Cox's points of contention with Marx was to argue that foreign trade, and not commodity production for the private accumulation of capital, was the primary driving force in capitalist development.

Cox was a founder of the world-systems perspective, which posits a socioeconomic system that encompasses part or all of the globe. Additionally, he was an important scholar of racism and its relationship to the development and spread of global capitalism, and a member of the Chicago School of Sociology.

== Family ==
Cox's parents were William Raphael Cox and Virginia Blake Cox. William was fairly prosperous by Trinidadian standards of the time. He worked as the captain of a revenue schooner, and later as a customs and excise officer. He and Virginia were able to raise a family of eight children in a middle-class lifestyle. Cox's uncle, Reginald Vidale, was the Catholic school master at St. Thomas Boys' School. He was a prominent teacher in the local school system and was highly respected in the community. In 1943, Reginald transitioned from the position of teacher to Inspector of Schools. He later became a city councilman, an alderman, and then mayor of Port Spain. Although Cox never married or had children, he was close to his three nieces: Ann V. Awon-Pantin, Esther Awon-Thomasos, and Juliet Awon-Uibopuu.

== Education ==
=== Early Education ===
While in Trinidad, Cox attended St. Thomas Boys' School, where he studied the usual range of primary school subjects. After his family emigrated to the United States, he attended Central YMCA High School and Crane Junior College in Chicago. Growing up in Trinidad, Cox was removed from the racial discrimination and hostilities present in the U.S. His youthful perspective was shaped by being a member of the majority group in Trinidad's predominantly black world, where white Europeans were considered outsiders. This perspective influenced his later research and sociological exploration.

=== University ===
In 1928, Cox earned a law degree from Northwestern University. In 1929, he had poliomyelitis (polio), causing both legs to be permanently disabled. He used a wheelchair for the remainder of his life. At that point in his higher education, he gave up plans to practice law in Trinidad, and opted to become an academic in the U.S. He next attended the University of Chicago where he studied in the Economics Department and obtained a master's degree in 1932. He stayed at the same university but switched to the Sociology Department to earn a Ph.D. in 1938. His dissertation was entitled "Factors Affecting the Marital Status of Negroes in the United States", and it was written under the supervision of William Fielding Ogburn.

== Academia ==
Cox initiated his teaching career at Wiley College in Marshall, Texas. From there, he lectured at Tuskegee Institute in 1944, where many thought he would "bring them prestige". In 1949, he moved to Jefferson City, Missouri, where he taught at Lincoln University until retiring in 1970. Upon encouragement by his colleague, Alvin W. Rose, a sociology professor at Detroit's Wayne State University, Cox accepted a position there as visiting professor in the early 1970s.

== Writings ==
Cox utilized the tools and methods of Marxist thought in his critiques of capitalism and race in Caste, Class and Race (1948), Foundations of Capitalism (1959), Capitalism and American Leadership (1962), Capitalism as a System (1964), and his last, Jewish Self-Interest and Black Pluralism (1974). In a scathing "Introduction" to The Black Anglo Saxons by Nathan Hare, Cox ridiculed what he regarded as a misguided approach to the study of race relations, which he called "The Black Bourgeoisie School" headed by E. Franklin Frazier.

== Caste, Class and Race (1948) ==
In 1948, Cox published his most profound and influential book, Caste, Class and Race, just ten years after obtaining his Ph.D. in sociology. Composed of over 600 pages of scholarship, the book remains a landmark of sociological analysis. He chose the title to highlight his opposition to W. Lloyd Warner's caste conception of race in the U.S. The book provided an alternative to the liberal pluralist view of race by attempting to integrate race and class. Cox believed that the racialized system in the U.S. was a result of the intersection of class and democracy. Understanding race, and race relations in the United States requires an understanding of the context and history of capitalism in America.

== Awards ==
The American Sociological Association (ASA) hands out two annual awards in honor of Cox: "The Section on Racial and Ethnic Minorities' Oliver Cromwell Cox Article Award (for Anti-Racist Scholarship)" and "The Section on Racial and Ethnic Minorities' Oliver Cromwell Cox Book Award (for Anti-Racist Scholarship)". In 1971, he was the first ever recipient of ASA's DuBois-Johnson-Frazier Award (later renamed the Cox-Johnson-Frazier Award). In 1968, he received the W. E. B. DuBois Award, given by the Association of Social and Behavioral Scientists.

== Selected works ==
Thesis

- "Factors Affecting the Marital Status of Negroes in the United States," University of Chicago (PhD, Sociology), 1938

Books

- Caste, Class, and Race: A Study in Social Dynamics, 1948
- Foundations of Capitalism, 1959
- Capitalism as a System, 1964
- Race Relations: Elements and Social Dynamics, 1976

Book Chapters

- "Leadership Among Negroes in the United States," in Studies in Leadership, by A. W. Gouldner (ed.), 1950
- "Introduction," in The Black Anglo Saxons, by Nathan Hare, 1965.

Journal Articles

- "Marital Status and Employment of Women," Sociology and Social Research, 25, 1940
- "Employment, Education, and Marriage of Young Negro Adults," Journal of Negro Education, 10, 1941
- "Lynching and Status Quo," Journal of Negro Education, 14, 1945
- "Jewish Self-Interest in 'Black Pluralism'", The Sociological Quarterly, 15(2), 1974

== Archival Papers ==
Cox's manuscript for Capitalism as a System is available for research in the Oliver Cromwell Cox Papers at the Walter P. Reuther Library in Detroit. https://reuther.wayne.edu/node/14325

== Sources ==
- Biography on the African-American Registry
- Oliver Cox, Caste, Class, and Race, Monthly Review Press, 1948.
- Cedric J. Robinson, "Oliver Cromwell Cox and the Historiography of the West," Cultural Critique 17 (Winter 1990/91), 5-20.
- H.M. Hunter (editor), The Sociology of Oliver C. Cox: New Perspectives (Research in Race and Ethnic Relations), JAI Press, 2000.
- Christopher A. McAuley, The Mind of Oliver C. Cox, University of Notre Dame Press, 2004.
- Todd Cronan, "Oliver Cromwell Cox and the Capitalist Sources of Racism," Jacobin (September 5, 2020).
