= Viola Klein =

British sociologist

- Born: 1908
- Died: 1973 (age 65)
- Scientific career
- Fields: Sociology

Viola Klein (1908–1973) was a sociologist in Great Britain. Her work demonstrated that objective ideas about women's attributes are socially constructed. Although her early training was in psychology and philosophy, her most prolific research engagements concerned women's social roles and how these changed after the Industrial Revolution. She was one of the first scholars to bring quantitative evidence to bear on this socio-economic topic. Her research not only illuminated the changing roles of women in society, but she also wrote and lectured on concrete social and political changes that would help facilitate these new roles.

== Early life ==
Viola Klein was born in Vienna in 1908 to a Jewish family. As a young student, she moved to Prague with her family owing to political circumstances after studying one year at the Sorbonne University in Paris and a short period at the University of Vienna. She continued her studies at the university in Prague and graduated in fields of psychology and philosophy. During her studies in Prague, she worked as an assistant editor. Besides psychology and philosophy, she was also interested in French literature. Her first doctoral thesis was about the linguistic style of the modernist French author Louis-Ferdinand Celine (Lyon 2007, p. 831). Because of her interest in the woman question she visited the Soviet Union in the 1930s. Inspired by this visit she wrote several articles in British magazines about "double speak" (Lyon 2007, p. 832). It represented the new role of women in society, marriage and the family. In 1938, she and her brother migrated to England. Shortly after fleeing, their parents died in a Nazi concentration camp.

As Jewish refugees, Klein and her brother had problems finding work in England. For a short period of time, she worked as a domestic servant until she finally received a scholarship from the Czech government operating in exile (Lyon 2007, p. 832). This enabled her to enroll in the London School of Economics and to work on her second doctorate diploma. During her studies in London, she met the well-known sociologist Karl Mannheim, who became her supervisor. Because of their similar cultural background they were interested in similar social issues, literature and art. Both of them were collecting information and ideas relating to her thesis while traveling across the country between different universities. In 1946, Klein published her second thesis, one of her best known publications - The Feminine Character: History of an Ideology. This publication was criticized because of its ostensibly militant feminism which departed from the traditional views and values. Her encouragement of women to work if they so desired, was perceived by critics as a destructive social force, provoking destabilization and family problems.

Klein worked in relatively lower status positions as editor, translator and teacher. However, she continued her research working on female employment in Great Britain (Lyon, 2007, p. 834). Starting in 1951, she collaborated with the Swedish sociologist Alva Myrdal and together they eventually published the book Women's Two Roles: Home and Work. This publication helped her to increase her involvement in international research activities. In 1964, she was offered her first academic post as lecturer in the Sociology department at the University of Reading in Great Britain. After 3 years, she was promoted to senior lecturer and in 1971 to reader.

In 1973, shortly after her retirement, she died at the age of 65.

== General overview ==
Klein's thoughts were constructed around the meaning of a femininity concept and the social creation of a feminine character. In her first important work: The Feminine Character: History of an Ideology, she claimed that attitudes in society considered as feminine are not factual observations but preconceptions and particular subjective interpretations (Klein, Correspondence, May 30, 1942, Klein papers). Providing a question about sources of the knowledge about womanhood and examining studies from the beginning of the 19th century, she wanted to prove that "what we think of specific perspectives are not guaranteed truths but the ideas subject to the influence of surrounding culture and personal bias" (Terrant 2006, p. 134). With her work Klein wanted to demonstrate that scientists, whose assumptions result from particular branches of knowledge, are not free from the social, cultural and historical climates of their time (Klein 1946, p. 30). She observed that scientific objective studies about femininity are full of stereotypes and repeat particular traits like "passivity, emotionally, lack of abstract interests, greater intensity of personal relationships and, an instinctive tenderness for babies" (Klein 1946, p. 164). Therefore, she wanted to define a feminine nature, using notions of social and cultural expectations (Klein 1946, p. 171) "Klein sought to isolate psychological influences on sex difference by excluding sex-related traits that could be attributed to social function, historic tradition and prevailing ideology" (Klein, 1946, p. 129).

=== Gender, sex roles and role theory ===
For a long time before the concept of gender was used in scientific discourse (e.g. Butler 1990; Bornstein 1995), Klein considered Role Theory in her research on what is feminine (Terrant 2006, p. 148; Klein 1946). Pointing out that every individual in society occupies various social positions; Klein wrote that each position includes particular patterns of roles and behaviors (Klein 1946, p. 136). According to Klein, the process of becoming an adult is the action of learning appropriate role patterns like mother's role, teacher's role, school girl's role (Terrant 2006) and within every particular society these patterns are understood differently (Klein 1946, p. 136). "Male and female roles are thought to be the new members of the social group in innumerable and subtle ways almost from birth. They are reinforced by experience, example, innuendos and the various others means by which social control is usually exercised" (Klein 1946, p. 136). Starting from stereotypes about womanhood and sex-role prejudices, Klein explained that the framework in which individuals develop and which shapes the way individuals adapt is full of common belief, social opinion, and tradition (Klein 1946, p. 1).

What Klein started in her research, supervised by Mannheim and known as an ideology of feminine character (Klein 1946), came to be known as psychosocial orientation after 1975 and eventually subsumed into the nexus that we know today as gender. (Butler 1990). As Shira Terrant claimed, Klein's research about femininity conceptualized within Mannheim methodology - underestimated by the second-wave of feminists - in fact gave roots to this concept (Terrant 2006). Contrary to Parsons' functionalistic understanding of Role Theory and sex-roles division, Klein understood the concept more broadly, that femininity and masculinity should include also personal traits that can be more or less assigned to the opposite sex's character (Terrant 2006, p. 150), a concept later solidified in transgender and queer theory (e.g. Butler 1990; Bornstein 1995).

=== The Sociology of knowledge ===
Within Mannheim's sociology of knowledge framework (Wikipedia outline: The sociology of knowledge is the study of the relationship between human and the social context within which it arises, and of the effects prevailing ideas have on societies) and its standpoint to understand how "individuals give meaning to their ongoing reality within context [that is] structured by specific institutions [and how] social values structure our perception, give legitimacy to certain ways of seeing the world, and give moral credence to particular patterns of relationships" (Farganias, p. 12-13) reality is understood by individuals within institutionally structured frameworks. Klein was the first who used Mannheim's theory and applied it to studies about a particular subject: femininity (Terrant 2006). Concerning the social world, "Mannheim’s perspective required the thinker to look for ways of interpreting the situation more clearly and productively" (Terrant 2006). Within this exposure and conceptualization of social reality this way of examining reality can provide motivation for women's emancipation.

Political thought of women (connecting gender, race, & nationality) Klein considered the problem of social construction of the feminine more widely, women and men of one society being participants of two cultural systems and in regards to hegemonic norms, one is dominant to the other (Klein 1946, p. 174). In this context, Klein understood that women have a secondary status like particular discriminated groups in society, for example black Americans, Jews or immigrants (Terrant 2006, p. 171). What she believed to be the most challenging for women was that they "internalized the sense of secondary status" (Klein 2006, p. 174), thus many accepted their own suppression. Klein called this phenomenon "a collective inferiority complex" (Terrant 2006, p. 152) which she saw as analogous to other minority groups (Klein 1942).

For Klein, the reason for women's conformity and acceptance of their secondary status, are social attitudes manifested in powerful institutions of sex-roles, power and dominance-submission relations, and group prejudices (Terrant 2006, p. 152). The problem with the change of women's situations, according to her, was the strong character of stereotypes which are socially reproduced and carried from generation to generation enduring in people's minds (Terrant 2006, p. 153).

== Viola Klein and Karl Mannheim ==
During the period that Klein knew Karl Mannheim, he was a good friend and a mentor to her. His theory of the sociology of knowledge as well as his scientific modus operandi greatly influenced Klein (Tarrant 2006). Both were refugees from the Nazi regime, they first encountered each other in the London School of Economics, where Mannheim helped and guided Klein in the process of earning her second doctorate, this time in sociology. At first naming her thesis "Feminism and Antifeminism: A Study in Ideologies and Social Attitudes", by the time of its completion in 1944 and its publication in 1946 the title and subject had changed to The Feminine Character: History of an Ideology (Tarrant 2006, 137).

== The Feminine Character - History of an Ideology ==
The book The Feminine Character: History of an Ideology [first published in 1946, second edition in 1971] is the second major thesis of Klein. This work is introduced with a foreword by Karl Mannheim where he explains that the question of the feminine character cannot be reached with only one field of study; for instance he said that we can find this topic in "biology, philosophy, psycho-analysis, experimental psychology, psychometrics, history, literary history, anthropology and sociology." (p. vii). All these fields of knowledge have their own rules of research, with different results but complementarity of themes and utilities. According to Mannheim "All of the social sciences have a common method to - the understanding of human behavior; a common method the quantitative analysis of behavior records; and a common aspiration - to devise ways of experimenting upon behavior." (p. xii). In this foreword, he argues in favor of Klein's intentions which had been criticized by other authors. To him, she took old research not to plagiarize, but to give rise to another outlook. He explains that she tried to create new questioning based on already completed research in different fields of studies.

In the preface to the second edition, Klein responds to criticism from other authors, especially sociologists who reproach her for a lack of own research and sociological studies. The writer Rosa Macaulay, was one such critic who accused her of using "secondary sources" instead of doing "original research" (p. xv). Klein explains that the universal theme that is the feminine role deserves to be constantly re-examined and matched with old and new studies, because scholars' ways of thinking guide our understandings of society more subjectively than objectively, regardless of the empirical framework. Given the universal theme of women and femininity she argues looking at the historical background of the social status of women, to see and compare feminine traits according to politics, socio-economics, and epochs, is perennially useful to social scientists, if not lay thinkers in general.

"The feminine character" is her a psycho-sociological term to label "femininity" as a "psychosexual orientation" (p. xvii). This idea of psychosexual orientation comes from biology where the feminine character is only defined by the physiological sex concept. From this point of view Klein wanted to show how Role Theory has been developed. This theory is not about "sex roles" but more about male and female behavior, "temperament" that the society assigns to them. Even though her book was criticized for the way she researched and wrote, it helped develop the psychometric method.

The aim of her book was the "clarification of the idea of "femininity"" (p. 1). Some main questions about the evolution of new women's roles and traits, structure Klein's thesis: What is the new ideal of femininity? What are the effects on women's personality and how are they represented and considered by other social groups? Trying to answer these issues, the book shows that as long as society's expectations are changing, the feminine character will change in shape. Comparing different research demonstrates that the scientific knowledge has directly or indirectly influenced the "general trend of intellectual and emotional development." This influence by sciences is called "the mental climate" (p. 2). She especially notes the difference between scientific and social knowledge. In regards to sociology for example it is difficult to determine the "truth" when constructing an analysis. Scholars are heavily influenced by their social and cultural backgrounds which add to the subjectivity found in sociology. Scientific knowledge relies on such pragmatic instruments for analysis like theorems and formulas. That's why she mentions that relativism is avoided as long as possible.

Some contexts are given to conform with research on: "(a) the status of women in a given society; (b) the prevailing ideologies concerning women in a certain historical period, and (c) the author’s personal attitudes towards women." (p. 3-4). The masculine standards influencing society situate women as an "outgroup". This term describes implicitly the unequal strata of society. The concept of "outgroup" is based on "physical characteristics, historical tradition, social role and different process of socialization." (p. 4). Some turning points began the process of emancipation of women and their roles inside the social group that they are assigned to in societies. The first one was the Industrial Revolution; technological changes and surges in demand for labor implied that physical strength or traditional forms of labor no longer defined who could be productive. Then World War II led women to take on both male and female types of work, because only men were sent to fight and die, while women were left to maintain society and families (in both care and economic stability). Moreover, the capitalist ideology, itself supported by the spreading of democracy during the second part of the twentieth century, celebrated women's emancipation as labor was the engine of production, and more laborers meant more profits. The democracy ideology extols the equality between all human beings. Thus this thought reevaluates the role of the woman in society. Democratic institutions inevitably lead to enfranchisement. Also to be noted is that development led to the size of families decreasing, meaning that women had less (second shift) work to do in the family. All of these changes lead to a shift in how society views women.

"Owing, presumably, to the emotional character of philanthropic work and to the absence of pecuniary profit attaching to it, it did not seem "improper" for women of standing to engage in charitable activities, and soon we find ladies of rank and consequence running charity organizations, working for prison reform, collecting rent in the slums of the East End of London, embarking on propaganda for the abolition of slavery, against cruelty to children, against alcoholism and prostitution, and for the emancipation of women. The social history of the nineteenth century is full of women pioneers in all fields of social reform." (p.17).

== Women's Two Roles ==
This book was co-written by Alva Myrdal and Klein, and supported by the International Federation of University of Women (IFUW) "to make an international survey of the needs for social reforms if women are to be put into a position to reconcile family and professional life" (p. IX). The method was essentially questionnaires distributed by the IFUW in developed countries (USA, UK, France and Sweden). Women's roles had been changing for many decades. They shifted from a paradigm of "What can women do?" to "what should women do ?" (p. xi). Women are thought to be the strong link between family and the human role of "continuation of the race" (p. xi). Here, there have been two conflicting roles since the industrial revolution: taking part in societal roles of economic and even political natures, and having home roles of caring and household management.

Both roles were formerly situated within household which were both the main centers of family care and economic production. After the industrial revolution society needs to "regenerate itself" (p. xii) perpetually, because development and progress demand that women continue in the economic sphere as they had in former times, but this takes them out of the household and into the factory or office. Many different cultural-institutional traditions, e.g. Christianity, Islam, Communism and National Socialism, have divergent ideologies for the role(s) of women.

The women's social revolution took place in two main phases; the first one being the acceptance of women in a larger variety of jobs that were formerly restricted to "masculine jobs" (p. 1), and the second being "the growing number of women [combining] family and employment" (p. 1). Before the Industrial Revolution, women had an economic function within the family; they weren't working in a company but instead at home, crafting clothes, baking bread, making soap, raising the family (p. 4). After the industrial revolution, the economic function shifted to companies, this fueled not working as "a high standard of living" for women to define their upper class statuses.

During this period, publications were released measuring comparative aptitudes and traits of men and women. Psychologists and sociologists proved that women and men were not so different and if a man tended to be stronger for example, a woman was more agile. This process had been accelerated by both the World Wars, women had a huge importance in economic capital when men were fighting on the battlefield. After these wars, women had more favorable positions in economic progress: "Our society has begun to accept the fact that women are in jobs to stay" (p. 4). With it also came the emancipation of women with the right to vote, to work, and to education. The right to vote earned after World War I in the US, UK, Sweden and after World War II in France (p. 7) meant women were now political equals as well. The right to education allowed access to a larger range of fields like medicine formerly restricted to males. The right to work finally claimed by women "to regain position in the economic productivity and sense of social usefulness, the restitution of their lost share (…) Work moved out of the home, women wanted to move after it" (p. 7).

The second phase of this social revolution had two major developments; "the increased average life-expectancy" and "the change of the size and structure of the family" (p. 13). Better hygienic conditions in societies and massive increases in medical knowledge and technology led to infant mortality decreasing greatly between 1850 and 1950 coupled with longer life expectancy, with averages crossing 70 years of age whereas "one half of female population died before the age of 45" (p. 7) a hundred years before. Over the decades the average family size shrank. While in Victorian times, families had more than 5 children, the average was between 2 and 5 children in 1920 (p. 20) and in 1951 the proportion of women under 50 who had more than 5 children was merely 4,4% (p. 23). Myrdal and Klein predicted that families in the future would have an average of three children. Moreover, the interval between marriage and the first child should be two years and between every birth there should be a space of two years. If a woman got married at 22, the period of motherhood would be around 10 years "after which her expectation of life would be a further 40 years" (p. 24), a large period ripe with opportunities for other productive activities. Also there was a new development in the family structure; daughters were leaving home at the same time as sons, demanding independence that is "high in our scale of social value" (p. 25) to go to university, look for a job, and pursue independence. Daughters were not leaving home anymore just because they were getting married.

Today there exist two spheres of work and home. The equilibrium between the demands of the community and the needs of individuals was more stable in former times when these spheres shared the same geographic location by family (p. 29), "families work and leisure were shared much more evenly between men and women", leading to an asymmetric but more efficient partnership (p. 29). With the industrial revolution, things changed; the sphere of work was created and belonged to men while the home sphere was "the woman’s world" (p. 28). But when women got access to education, work, etc. the home role "should be done jointly by men and women if the ideal of a happy home is to become a reality" (p. 29). Nevertheless, a majority of men enjoyed using their leisure time to accomplish some work-hobbies at home, becoming an amateur painter, carpenter, etc. while women still took on the lion's share of household duties.

The authors separate a woman's adulthood into three phases. The first one is a step that lasts around 7–10 years in European countries and 5 years in the USA. It corresponds to the first years in adulthood, after school but before marriage. Only a few will stay in this phase corresponding to women who don't get married. In European countries 82% of women in this phase were working whereas it fell down to 51% in the USA. In this phase women are living a kind of "man’s life" before their marriage; they are independent. When getting married the second phase of woman's adulthood begins, motherhood. Due to child rearing, the home becomes their workplace. The weekly work load for a housewife rises depending on the number of children: an average of 56 hrs with no children and up to 78 hrs for three. The crucial fact described is that for working women the weekly work load in both spheres is 84 hrs with no children and 85 hrs with three, which goes to show the result of the combined strain of both spheres of life. Afterwards women enter the third phase of adulthood, when their children grow up and leave home. A period of crisis can follow, the housewife is now alone, she does not have as much to do at home as before and looking for a job at 40 is complicated. "The traditional stereotype is still at work in the minds of women themselves, making them believe that they are much older and much less capable than they in fact are" (p. 40).

The authors noticed sex divisions were different in observed countries except in nursing and teaching. Pharmacology and dentistry in France and Sweden became feminine fields of work. In the US, it was in finance, insurance and real estates (44% of women in UK work in this field) (p. 76). These conditions resulted from local conditions and traditions. One thing the authors were sure about was that the choice made by women was "strongly influenced by the role they hope to play in family" (p. 77). In the future, women will constitute a good portion of the labor market and it will permit women to soon do "more heart-searching when choosing a career" (p. 156) and obviously it is still important that they continue to fight for equality of rights between men and women.

== List of publications ==
- Klein, V., A. Myrdal (1968[1956]). Women's Two Roles: Home and Work. London: Routledge and Kegan Paul.
- Klein, V. (1936). Stil und Sprache des Louis Ferdinand Celine. PhD Thesis: University of Prague (Viola Klein Archive).
- Klein, V. (1960). ‘Married Women in Employment’, International Journal of Comparative Sociology 1(2): 254–61.
- Klein, V. (1963). ‘Working Wives: The Money’, New Society 40(4 July).
- Klein, V. (1965). Britain's Married Women Workers. London: Routledge & Kegan Paul.
- Klein, V. (1967). ‘Die Gegenwartige Situation der Soziologie in Grossbrittanien’, in G. Eisermann (ed.) Die Gegenwartige Situation der Soziologie. Stuttgart: Enke.
- Klein, V. (1961). Report on Working Wives in Britain. Marriage and Family Living. 23(4), p. 387.
- Klein, V. (1966). The Demand for Professional Womanpower. The British Journal of Sociology. 17(2), pp. 183–197.
- Klein, V. (1972[1946]). The Feminine Character: History of an Ideology. Urbana: University of Illinois Press.
- Klein, V. (1989[1946]). The Feminine Character: History of an Ideology. London: Routledge and Kegan Paul.
- Klein, V. (1965). Women Workers: Working Hours and Services. Paris: Organization for Economic Co-operation and Development.

== Sources ==
- Lyon, E.S. (2007). Viola Klein: Forgotten Émigré Intellectual, Public Sociologist and Advocate of Women. Sociology (SAGE Publications). 41(5), 829–842. http://www.reading.ac.uk/adlib/Details/archiveSpecial/110014353
- Bornstein, Kate. Gender Outlaw. New York: Routledge, 1995.
- Butler, Judith. Gender Trouble. New York: Routledge, 1990.
- Klein, Viola. Papers. University of Reading Archives, Reading, UK.
- Farganias, Sondra. The Social Reconstruction of The Feminine Character. Lanham, MD: (Klein Correspondence with Mannheim, May 15, 1942/ Klein, Correspondence, May 30, 1942, Klein papers)
- Klein, Viola. The Feminine Character. History of an Ideology. Chicago: University of Illinois Press, 1946.
- Rowman & Littlefield, 1996.
- Tarrant, Shira. When sex became gender. New York: Routledge, 2006.
