= Joan Woodward =

British sociologist (1916–1971)

- Born: 27 September 1916
- Died: 1971 (aged 54–55)
- Occupation: Professor
- Employers: Imperial College London; Department of Social Policy and Intervention, University of Oxford
- Known for: Research in Organization Sociology

Joan Woodward (27 September 1916 – 1971) was a British professor in industrial sociology and organizational studies.

== Background ==
Woodward was educated at Oxford University, where she gained a first in Philosophy, Politics and Economics in 1936, followed by an MA in medieval philosophy from Durham University in 1938, and a Diploma in Social and Public Administration from Oxford in 1939. During World War II she worked as a manager, rising to be Senior Labour Manager at ROF Bridgwater. She undertook her early research at South East Essex College of Technology, before joining Imperial College in 1957 as a part-time lecturer in Industrial Sociology and was appointed to a Senior Lectureship in the Production Engineering Section in 1962.

== Pursuits ==
Woodward was a leading academic and commentator in the field of Organization Theory, particularly Contingency Theory. Woodward was a pioneer for empirical research in organizational structures and author of analytical frameworks that establish the link between technology and production systems and their role in shaping effective organizational structures. She classified the technology into Unit based or (Small scale), Mass based or (large scale) and Continuous process organizations. All successful organizations in these categories, according to her, had a particular organizational structure.

Structural Characteristic	Unit based	Mass based	Continuous based
Number of management levels	Low	Medium	High
Supervisory span of control	Low	High	Low
Ratio of managers to total workforce	Low	Medium	High
Skill level of workers	High	Low	High
Overall structure	Organic	Mechanistic	Organic

In 1964, she was invited to work part-time for the Ministry of Labour. This was followed, in 1969, by an appointment as Professor of Industrial Sociology and Director of the Industrial Sociology Unit.

In 1970, Prof. Woodward published a book Industrial Organization: Behaviour and Control. This text described the complete work of her research group since 1962.

Her work received international recognition, leading to an invitation to join a group of the top seven organization theorists that was called the Magnificent Seven. Such international acclaim was rare for a woman at this period.

Woodward died in 1971, aged 54, after treatment for breast cancer.

== Works ==
- The Dockworker: an analysis of conditions of employment in the port of Manchester.. Liverpool: University of Liverpool Press, 1954
- The Saleswoman: a study of attitudes and behaviour in retail distribution. London: Isaac Pitman & Sons, 1960
- Industrial Organization: Theory and Practice. London, New York: Oxford University Press, 1965.
- (with Allan Flanders and Ruth Pomeranz) Experiment in industrial democracy: a study of the John Lewis Partnership. London: Faber, 1968.
- (ed.) Industrial Organization: Behaviour and Control. London: Oxford University Press, 1970.

== Legacy ==
As the second woman to receive a chair at Imperial College, Woodward is a role model for women in science, engineering and technology. The bi-annual Joan Woodward Memorial Lecture takes place at Imperial College Business School. The Joan Woodward Prize is bestowed annually on an undergraduate or post-graduate undertaking a thesis in a topic that matches the research interests of Joan Woodward. Both the lecture series and student prizes are supported by an endowment fund that has been established in her name.

In 2010 Woodward was the subject of a collection of essays in her honour.
