= Fred Nadel =

British anthropologist

Siegfried Frederick Nadel
- Born: 24 April 1903
- Died: 14 January 1956 (aged 52); Canberra
- Citizenship: British
- Scientific career
- Fields: anthropologist

Siegfried Frederick Nadel (24 April 1903 – 14 January 1956) was a British anthropologist, specialising in African ethnology.

== Early life and education ==
Siegfried Ferdinand Stephan Nadel was born on 24 April 1903 in Lemberg (Lviv), Galicia, part of the Habsburg monarchy. Both parents were born in Lemberg. His family, his father Moritz was a senior railway lawyer, moved to Vienna in 1912. After attending State Real Gymnasium (Vienna), 1913–1921, he enrolled at the Musik-academie in the University of Vienna; his early ambition was to be a conductor and composer. He was an extraordinarily talented polymath. Music led him to the psychology of music and general psychology was at that time affiliated with philosophy. He was awarded his dissertation (in musicology) in November 1925. That year he was also temporary assistant conductor at the Düsseldorf Opera House. The following year he married Lisbeth Braun (b. 1900), also a musicologist.

== Career ==
In 1927 he established his own opera company, which toured Czechoslovakia. After spending a brief time in England at a summer school of music he returned to Vienna where he continued to work as a musicologist, developing an interest in African, Javanese and Caucasian music. At the Musikkonservatorium he sorted the ethno-musical papers of Rudolf Poch and later catalogued musical instruments for the Wiener Museum für Völkerkunde. He maintained an interest in psychology and was an active member of the psychological colloquiums of Karl Buehler. He worked also as an Assistant in the Psychological Institute.(Gray)

Nadel handed in his Habilitation - Der Duale Sinn der Music ('The Dual Nature of Music: A Musical Typlogy') - on 10 December 1930. The failure of Nadel to pass his Habilitation was a result of professional and disciplinary infighting, it was not directed at him personally; a close reading of the minutes of the meeting, however, reveals underlying antisemitism widely growing in Vienna at the time.(Gray)

Throughout this period Nadel served as an assistant at the Psychologisches Institut and grew more and more interested in ethnomusicology. He produced radio programs for Radio Vienna on music which included discussions of non-Western music, and in 1930 wrote a piece on the marimba. This transformed into an interest in the anthropology of Africa, which was encouraged by Diedrich Westermann, with whom Nadel studied the musicology of 'primitive peoples' at the Phonogrammarchiv in Berlin, and African languages at the University of Berlin.

In 1932 Nadel was awarded a Rockefeller Fellowship, allowing him to do post-graduate training in anthropological African field research. Nadel studied at the London School of Economics, supervised by Bronisław Malinowski and C.G. Seligman. Nadel was one of three students—the other being Meyer Fortes and Sjoerd Hofstra—to receive this fellowship, and they became known as 'The Mandarins', one of the first cohort of students to study with Malinowski. A closely knit group, all them planned on studying West Africa, and even traveled in the same ship from England to Africa. Nadel began his fieldwork in Nigeria in 1933 with the Nupe people of modern-day Nigeria. His PhD, completed in 1935, was entitled Political and Religious Structure of Nupe Society.

After earning his PhD Nadel grew increasingly involved in British colonial administration. He continued to conduct fieldwork in Nigeria and lectured at the Summer School on Colonial Administration at the University of Oxford. In 1938 he became the Government Anthropologist of the Anglo-Egyptian Sudan and conducted fieldwork with the Nuba. During a brief fieldbreak in Al-Ubayyid Nadel wrote Black Byzantium on the Nupe (which would not be published until 1942) and The Nuba: An Anthropological Study of the Hill Tribes in Kordofan (which would not appear in print until 1947). In 1941, as World War II broke out, Nadel enlisted in the Sudan Defence Force, transferring later that year to the British Army's East African Command. By this time Nadel had served on the Eritrean-Ethiopean border and was appointed, as a Major, Secretary of native Affairs in the British Military Administration of Eritrea. In 1944 he returned to England produced academic work on the Nuba and Eritrea, including Land Tenure on the Eritrean Plateau. In 1945 he was transferred to the Home Establishment, promoted to Lieutenant-Colonel, and made Secretary of Native Affairs and Deputy Chief Secretary of the British Military Administration in Tripolitania.

Nadel left government service in 1946 and quickly rose through the ranks of British anthropology. He served as a lecturer at the London School of Economics and then in 1948 became the head of the anthropology department at the University of Durham. In 1950 he was appointed to the inaugural chair in anthropology at the Australian National University (ANU). Raymond Firth who had served as Advisor and Acting Director of the Research School of Pacific (and Asian) Studies to plan the shape of ANU and Pacific Studies resigned in 1952 and Nadel was appointed Dean of the School. During the early 1950s Nadel published two more books, Foundations of Social Anthropology (1951) and Nupe Religion (1954). He died unexpectedly at the age of 53 of a coronary thrombosis. His Theory of Social Structure appeared posthumously in 1957. The life and work of Nadel is commemorated in the Nadel Essay Prize.Gray, Geoffrey, 2018. " A Figure of Importance. Life and Work of Siegfried Frederick Nadel " in Bérose - Encyclopédie internationale des histoires de l'anthropologie, Paris, IIAC-LAHIC, UMR 8177.

== Bibliography ==
- A Black Byzantium: the Kingdom of Nupe in Nigeria. (1942)
- The Foundations of Social Anthropology. (1951)
- Nupe Religion. (1954)
- Nadel, S F (1956), "Culture and personality: a reexamination.", Med. J. Aust., vol. 43, no. 23 (published 8 December 1956), pp. 845–9, doi:10.5694/j.1326-5377.1956.tb57330.x, PMID 13386575, S2CID 38138269
- The Theory of Social Structure. (1957)

== Sources and external links ==
- Obituary by Raymond Firth (PDF file)
- Catalogue of the Nadel papers at the Archives Division of the London School of Economics.
