= 1940s in music =

For music from an individual year in the 1940s, go to 40 | 41 | 42 | 43 | 44 | 45 | 46 | 47 | 48 | 49

In the developed world, swing, big band, jazz, Latin and country music dominated and defined the popular music of the 1940s. After World War II, the big band sounds of the earlier part of the decade had been gradually replaced by crooners and vocal pop.

== The U.S. and North America ==
=== Pop ===
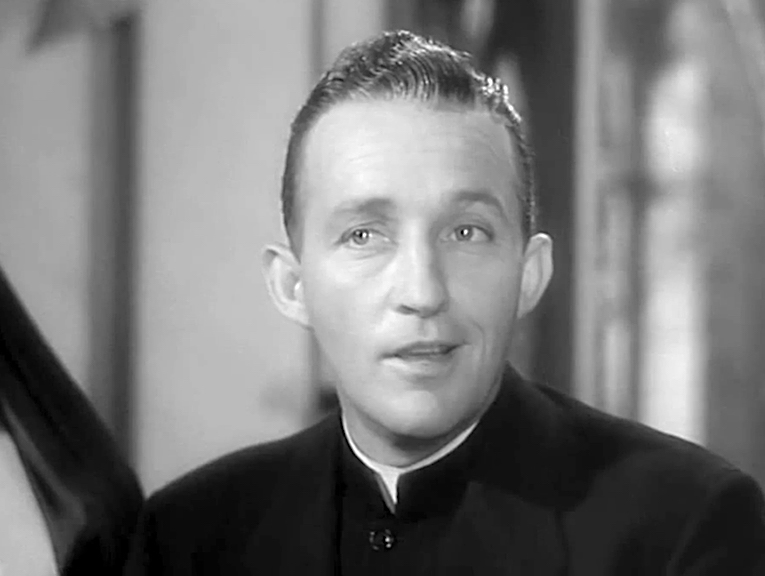
Bing Crosby was the best selling pop artist of the 1940s.

Ragtime, a genre that first became popular in the 1890s, was popular through about the 1940s. After its best-known exponent, Scott Joplin, died in 1917, the genre faded. As the 1920s unfolded, jazz rapidly took over as the dominant form of popular music in the United States.

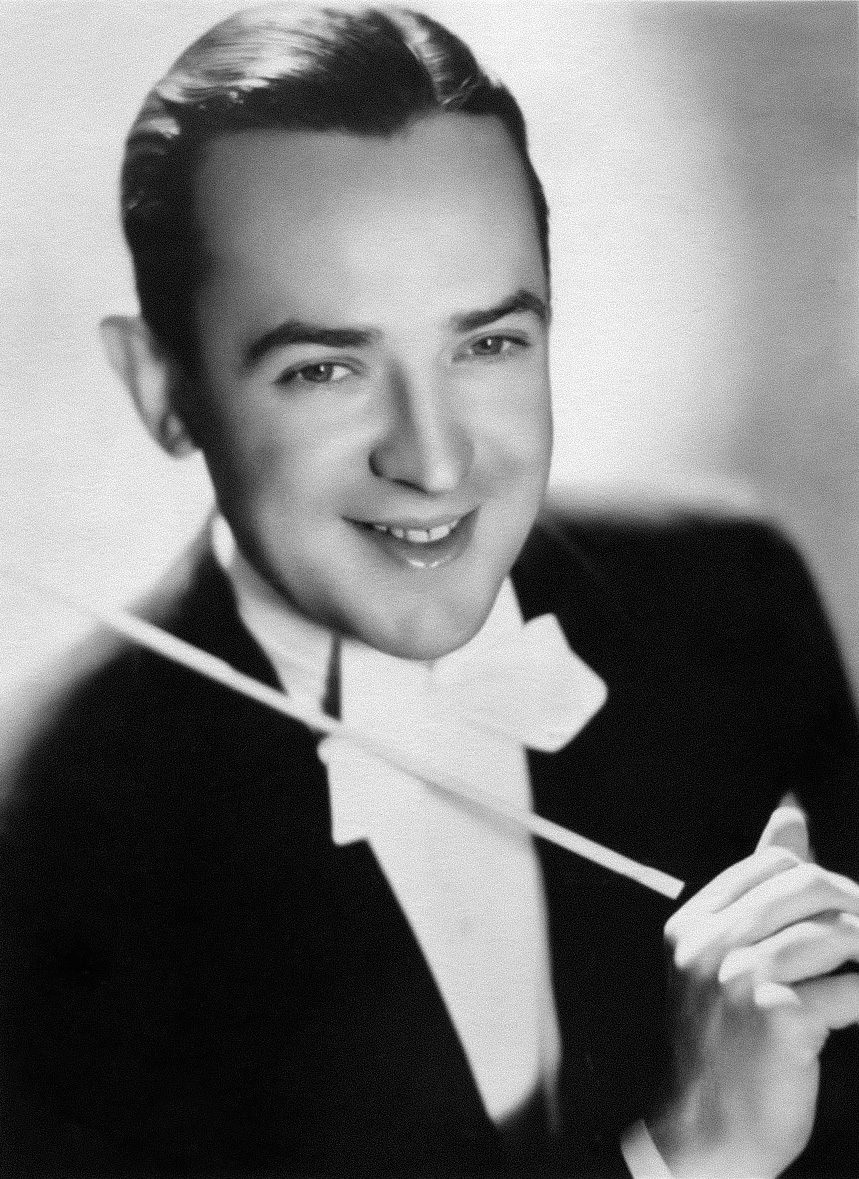
Jimmy Dorsey remained at the top of the Billboard number-one singles chart for 32 weeks.

In addition, a new form of popular music, crooning, emerged during the early 1930s. Technology played a large part in the development of this style, as electronic sound recording had emerged near the end of the 1920s and replaced the earlier acoustic recording. While singers such as Al Jolson and Billy Murray had recorded songs by yelling into a Victrola horn, as this was the only way to get audible sound with acoustic recording, the new electronic equipment allowed for a softer, more intimate style of singing. Many of the older singers such as Jolson and Murray consequently fell out of favor during the 1930s with changing tastes (although Al Jolson managed a successful career comeback after World War II).

Bing Crosby was the leading figure of the crooner sound as well as its most iconic, defining artist. By the 1940s, he was an entertainment superstar who mastered all of the major media formats of the day, movies, radio, and recorded music. Other popular singers of the day included Cab Calloway and Eddie Cantor.

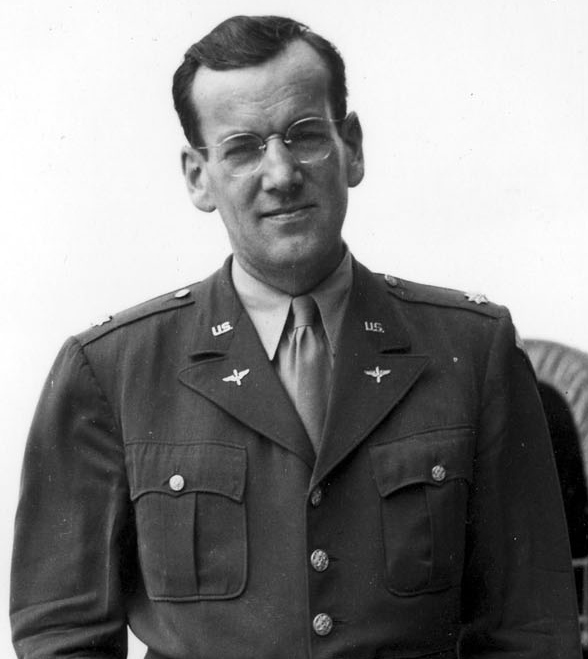
Glenn Miller big-band trombonist, arranger, composer, and bandleader in the swing era.

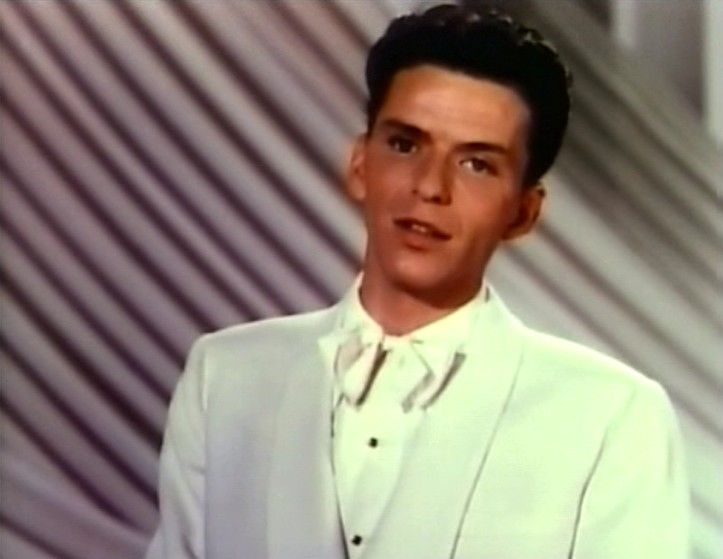
Frank Sinatra was one of the best-selling male pop artists of the 1940s.

Bandleaders such as the Dorsey Brothers often helped launch the careers of vocalists who went on to gain popularity as solo artists, such as Frank Sinatra, who rose to fame as a singer during this time. Sinatra's vast appeal to the "bobby soxers" revealed a whole new audience for popular music, which had generally appealed mainly to adults up to that time, making Sinatra the first teen idol. Sinatra's music mostly attracted young girls to his concerts. This image of a teen idol would also be seen with future artists such as Elvis Presley and The Beatles. Sinatra's massive popularity was also one of the reasons why the big band music declined in popularity; major record companies were looking for crooners and pop singers to attract a youth audience due to his success. Frank Sinatra would go on to become one of the most successful artists of the 1940s and one of the best selling music artists of all time. Sinatra remained relevant through the 1950s and 60s, even with rock music being the dominant form of music in his later years. In the later decades, Sinatra's music would be mostly aimed at an older adult audience. Sinatra remains one of the most respected and critically acclaimed music artists of all time.

Big band swing could variably be an instrumental style or accompany a vocalist. In comparison to its loud, brash, rhythmic sound stood the "sweet" bands which played a softer, more melodic style. The most notable of these, in no small part thanks to a long postwar TV career, was the band of Lawrence Welk. Also noteworthy were performances on the radio by the Shep Fields Rippling Rhythm Orchestra and by Guy Lombardo's Royal Canadian Orchestra, which performed a sweet jazz rendition of "Ault Lang Syne" for decades on both radio and television.

While swing bands could be found in most major cities during the 1930s–1940s, the most popular and famous were the bands of Glenn Miller, Benny Goodman, and Artie Shaw, which had national followings and sold huge numbers. World War II brought an end to big band swing as many musicians were conscripted into the armed forces and travel restrictions made it hard for bands to tour. In 1944, Glenn Miller was killed when his plane crashed into the English Channel en route to a USO show in France. His death is widely considered to mark the close of the swing era.

After the war, a combination of factors such as changing demographics and rapid inflation made large bands unprofitable, so that popular music in the US came to be dominated instead by traditional pop and crooners, as well as bebop and jump blues.

=== Best selling records ===
Before the Hot100 was implemented in 1958, Billboard magazine measured a record's performance with three charts, "Best-Selling Popular Retail Records", "Records Most Played By Disk Jockeys" and 'Most-Played Juke Box Records': However, since the latter two charts were not implemented until mid-decade, we focus on 'Best-Selling Retail Records of the 1940s.' Since it consisted of ten positions for most of the decade, only ten per week were recognized. Each week fifteen points were awarded to the number one record, then nine points for number two, eight points for number three, and so on, with one point for number ten. This system balances songs that reach the highest positions, as well as those that had the longest chart runs. Calculations are unaffected by year-end cutoffs as with Billboard (see discussion).

Rank	Artist	Title	Label	Recorded	Released	Chart Positions
1	The Mills Brothers	"Paper Doll"	Decca 18318	February 18, 1942	May 22, 1943	US Billboard 1943 #1, US Pop #1 for 12 weeks, 40 total weeks, US R&B 1943 #3, Harlem Hit Parade #2 for 5 weeks, 29 total weeks, 287 points, 6,000,000 sales, Grammy Hall of Fame 1998
2	Glenn Miller and His Orchestra	"Chattanooga Choo Choo"	Bluebird 11230	May 7, 1941	July 25, 1941	US Billboard 1941 #1, US Pop #1 for 9 weeks, 28 total weeks, 253 points, Grammy Hall of Fame 1996, ASCAP song of 1941
3	Bing Crosby	"White Christmas"	Decca 18429	May 29, 1942	July 30, 1942	US Billboard 1942 #1, US Pop #1 for 14 weeks, 37 total weeks, US R&B 1943 #18, Harlem Hit Parade #1 for 3 weeks, 9 total weeks, 191 points (1942) + 60 pts (43-46) = 251, 2,600,000 sales 1944, 50,000,000 2007, Grammy Hall of Fame 1974
4	Harry James and His Orchestra (Vocal Helen Forrest)	"I've Heard That Song Before"	Columbia 36668	July 31, 1942	December 4, 1942	US Billboard 1943 #2, US Pop #1 for 13 weeks, 26 total weeks, US R&B 1943 #26, Harlem Hit Parade #1 for 1 weeks, 10 total weeks, 240 points
5	Francis Craig and His Orchestra	"Near You"	Bullet 1001	February 1947	March 1947	US Billboard 1947 #1, US Pop #1 for 17 weeks, 25 total weeks, 236 points, sold 2.5 million
6	Freddy Martin and His Orchestra	"Piano Concerto In B Flat"	Bluebird 11211	June 16, 1941	July 3, 1941	US Billboard 1941 #2, US Pop #1 for 8 weeks, 26 total weeks, 230 points
7	Artie Shaw and His Orchestra	"Frenesi"	Victor 26542	March 3, 1940	March 29, 1940	US Billboard 1940 #1, US Pop #1 for 13 weeks, 29 total weeks, 223 points, Grammy Hall of Fame 2000, 1,000,000 sold
8	Vaughn Monroe and His Orchestra	"Ballerina"	RCA Victor 20-2433	August 12, 1947	October 1947	US Billboard 1947 #3, US Pop #1 for 10 weeks, 22 total weeks, 222 points
9	Bing Crosby	"Swinging on a Star"	Decca 18597	February 7, 1944	April 1944	US Billboard 1944 #1, US Pop #1 for 9 weeks, 28 total weeks, 219 points, 1,000,000 sales
10	Vaughn Monroe and His Orchestra	"Riders in the Sky (A Cowboy Legend)"	RCA Victor 20-3411	March 14, 1949	May 14, 1949	US Billboard 1949 #1, US Pop #1 for 12 weeks, 22 total weeks, US Country 1949 #43, Country #2 for 1 week, 3 total weeks, 218 points
11	Tommy Dorsey and His Orchestra (Vocal Frank Sinatra	"I'll Never Smile Again"	Victor 26628	April 23, 1940	June 7, 1940	US Billboard 1940 #2, US Pop #1 for 12 weeks, 20 total weeks, 216 points
12	Dinah Shore and Her Happy Boys	"Buttons and Bows"	Columbia 38284	November 30, 1947	August 16, 1948	US Billboard 1948 #1, US Pop #1 for 10 weeks, 23 total weeks, 215 points, Grammy Hall of Fame in 1998, sold 2.5 million
13	Les Brown and his Orchestra (Vocal Chorus by Doris Day)	"Sentimental Journey"	Columbia 36769	November 20, 1944	January 22, 1945	US Billboard 1945 #1, US Pop #1 for 8 weeks, 28 total weeks, 213 points, Grammy Hall of Fame in 1998, 1,000,000 sales
14	Pee Wee Hunt Orchestra	"Twelfth Street Rag"	Capitol 15105	November 8, 1947	June 1948	US Billboard 1948 #2, US Pop #1 for 8 weeks, 32 total weeks, 211 points
15	Ted Weems and His Orchestra	"Heartaches"	Decca 25017	August 23, 1938	December 1946	US Billboard 1947 #2, US Pop #1 for 13 weeks, 20 total weeks, 204 points
16	The Ink Spots	"The Gypsy"	Decca 18817	February 19, 1946	March 1946	US Billboard 1946 #2, US Pop #1 for 13 weeks, 23 total weeks, US Most-Played Race Records 1946 #6, Race Records #1 for 2 weeks, 13 total weeks, 198 points, 1,000,000 sales
17	Peggy Lee (Dave Barbour Orchestra)	"Manana (Is Soon Enough for Me)"	Capitol 15022	November 25, 1947	January 1948	US Billboard 1948 #3, US Pop #1 for 9 weeks, 21 total weeks, 191 points
18	Perry Como	"Till The End Of Time"	Victor 20-1709	July 3, 1945	July 30, 1945	US Billboard 1945 #2, US Pop #1 for 9 weeks, 17 total weeks, 189 points, Grammy Hall of Fame in 1998, 1,000,000 sales
19	Bing Crosby	"Only Forever"	Decca 3300	July 3, 1940	August 1940	US Billboard 1940 #3, US Pop #1 for 9 weeks, 22 total weeks, 185 points
20	Bing Crosby and the Andrews Sisters	"Don't Fence Me In"	Decca 23364	July 25, 1944	November 1944	US Billboard 1944 #2, US Pop #1 for 8 weeks, 21 total weeks, US Most-Played Race Records 1945 #49, Race Records #9 for 1 week, 1 total weeks, 183 points, 1,000,000 sales
21	Johnny Mercer And The Pied Pipers	"On the Atchison, Topeka and the Santa Fe"	Capitol 195	December 13, 1944	July 1945	US Billboard 1945 #3, US Pop #1 for 7 weeks, 19 total weeks, 182 points
22	Perry Como	"Some Enchanted Evening"	RCA Victor 20-3402	March 1, 1949	April 1949	US Billboard 1949 #5, US Pop #1 for 5 weeks, 26 total weeks, 182 points
23	Glenn Miller and his Orchestra	"(I've Got a Gal In) Kalamazoo"	Victor 27934	August 1, 1942	September 12, 1942	US Billboard 1942 #3, US Pop #1 for 7 weeks, 18 total weeks, 181 points, 1,000,000 sales
24	Andrews Sisters	"Rum and Coca-Cola"	Decca 18636	October 23, 1944	December 1944	US Billboard 1945 #5, US Pop #1 for 10 weeks (Juke Box), 21 total weeks, US Most-Played Race Records 1945 #23, Race Records #3 for 1 week, 3 total weeks, 179 points, 1,000,000 sales
25	Glenn Miller and his Orchestra	"Moonlight Cocktail"	Bluebird 11401	May 7, 1941	July 25, 1941	US Billboard 1942 #4, US Pop #1 for 10 weeks, 21 total weeks, 178 points, 1,000,000 sales
26	Harry James and His Orchestra (Vocal Dick Haymes)	"I'll Get By (As Long As I Have You)"	Columbia 36698	April 7, 1941	March 1944	US Billboard 1944 #3, US Pop #1 for 6 weeks (Juke Box chart), 29 total weeks, 178 points
27	Tommy Dorsey and His Orchestra (Vocal Frank Sinatra and Pied Pipers)	"There Are Such Things"	Victor 27974	July 1, 1942	July 17, 1942	US Billboard 1943 #3, US Pop #1 for 5 weeks, 26 total weeks, US R&B 1943 #22, Harlem Hit Parade #2 for 1 week, 13 total weeks, 176 points, 1,000,000 sales
28	The Andrews Sisters with Gordon Jenkins Orchestra	"I Can Dream, Can't I?"	Decca 24705	July 15, 1949	August 22, 1949	US Billboard 1949 #3, US Pop #1 for 5 weeks, 25 total weeks, 175 points
29	Bing Crosby	"Sunday, Monday or Always"	Decca 18561	July 2, 1943	August 21, 1943	US Billboard 1943 #4, US Pop #1 for 7 weeks, 20 total weeks, 174 points, 1,000,000 sales
30	Frankie Laine	"That Lucky Old Sun"	Mercury 5316	June 14, 1949	August 19, 1949	US Billboard 1949 #2, US Pop #1 for 8 weeks, 22 total weeks, 173 points
31	Dinah Shore	"I'll Walk Alone"	Victor 20-1586	March 1944	May 1944	US Billboard 1944 #6, US Pop #1 for 4 weeks, 26 total weeks, US R&B 1944 #44, Harlem Hit Parade #10 for 2 weeks, 2 total weeks, CashBox #1, 173 points
32	Vic Damone	"You're Breaking My Heart"	Mercury 5271	February 15, 1949	May 1949	US Billboard 1949 #6, US Pop #1 for 4 weeks, 26 total weeks, 172 points
33	Jimmy Dorsey and His Orchestra	"Amapola (Pretty Little Poppy)"	Decca 3629	February 3, 1941	February 1941	US Billboard 1941 #3, US Pop #1 for 10 weeks, 18 total weeks, 171 points
34	Swing And Sway With Sammy Kaye	"Daddy"	Victor 27391	March 31, 1941	April 25, 1941	US Billboard 1941 #4, US Pop #1 for 8 weeks, 19 total weeks, 170 points
35	The Mills Brothers	"You Always Hurt The One You Love"	Decca 18599	February 27, 1944	May 1944	US Billboard 1944 #4, US Pop #1 for 5 weeks, 32 total weeks, US R&B 1944 #29, Harlem Hit Parade #5 for 3 weeks, 24 total weeks, 170 points, 1,000,000 sales
36	Bing Crosby	"I'll Be Seeing You"	Decca 18595	February 17, 1944	April 1944	US Billboard 1944 #7, US Pop #1 for 4 weeks, 28 total weeks, 168 points
37	Eddy Howard and His Orchestra	"To Each His Own"	Majestic 7188	April 16, 1946	June 1946	US Billboard 1946 #1, US Pop #1 for 8 weeks, 24 total weeks, 167 points, 1,000,000 sales
38	Glen Gray and the Casa Loma Orchestra	"My Heart Tells Me (Should I Believe My Heart?)"	Decca 18567	October 1, 1943	November 1943	US Billboard 1944 #8, US Pop #1 for 5 weeks, 24 total weeks, 166 points
39	The Harmonicats	"Peg o' My Heart"	Vitacoustic 1	March 1947	April 1947	US Billboard 1947 #4, US Pop #1 for 8 weeks, 26 total weeks, 165 points
40	Perry Como	"Prisoner of Love"	RCA Victor 20-1814	December 18, 1945	March 1946	US Billboard 1946 #7, US Pop #1 for 3 weeks, 20 total weeks, 165 points, 1,000,000 sales

=== Jazz ===
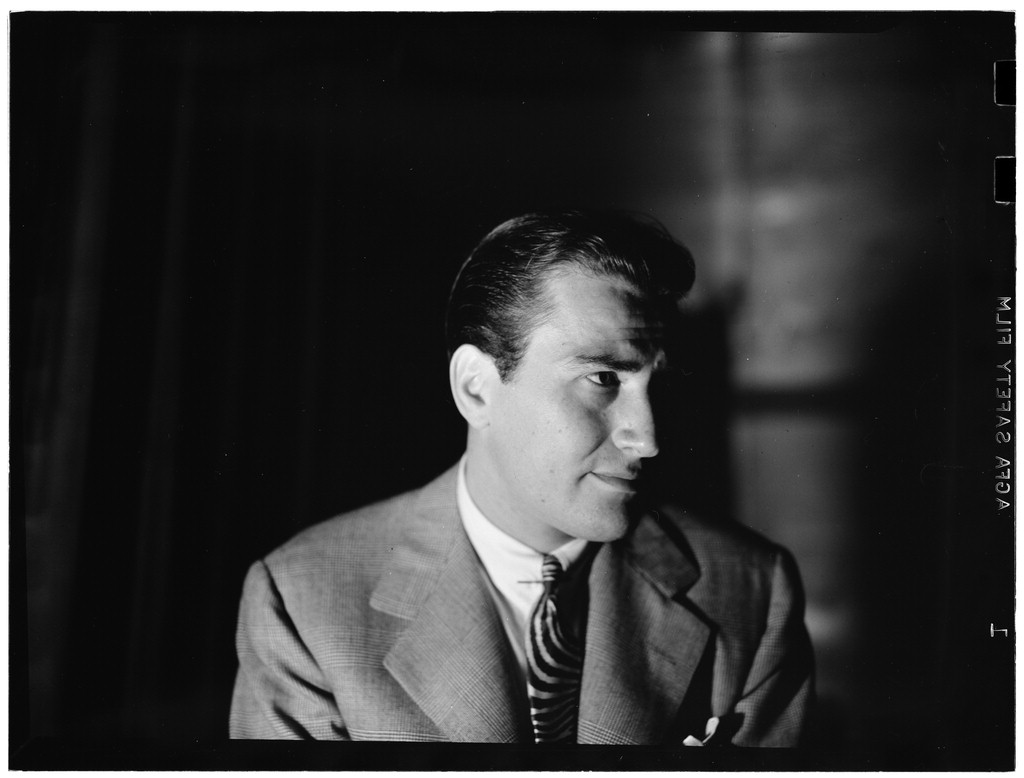
Artie Shaw, ca 1947. Photograph by William P. Gottlieb

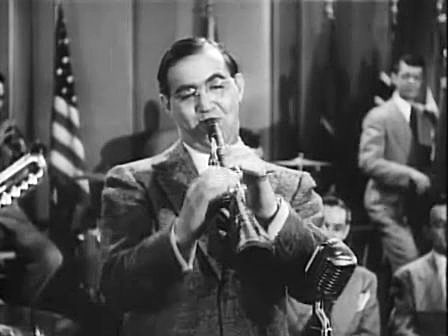
Benny Goodman performing in Stage Door Canteen (1943)

In the early 1940s, bebop emerged, led by Charlie Parker, Dizzy Gillespie, Thelonious Monk and others. It helped to shift jazz from danceable popular music towards a more complex "musician's music." Differing greatly from swing, early bebop divorced itself from dance music, establishing itself more as an art form but lessening its potential popular and commercial value. Since bebop was meant to be listened to, not danced to, it used faster tempos.

The swing era lasted until the mid-1940s, and produced popular tunes such as Duke Ellington's "Cotton Tail" (1940) and Billy Strayhorn's "Take the 'A' Train" (1941). When the big bands struggled to keep going during World War II, a shift was happening in jazz in favor of smaller groups. Some swing era musicians, like Louis Jordan, later found popularity in a new kind of music, called "rhythm and blues", that would evolve into rock and roll in the 1950s.

By the end of the 1940s, the nervous energy and tension of bebop was replaced with a tendency towards calm and smoothness, that eventually influenced the birth of cool jazz, which favoured long, linear melodic lines in the 1950s.

By the 1940s, Dixieland jazz revival musicians like Jimmy McPartland, Eddie Condon and Bud Freeman had become well-known and established their own unique style. Most characteristically, players entered solos against riffing by other horns, and were followed by a closing with the drummer playing a four-bar tag that was then answered by the rest of the band.

Some of the most notable Jazz artists of the 1940s include Ella Fitzgerald, Billie Holiday, Louis Armstrong and also Nat King Cole.

=== Country music ===
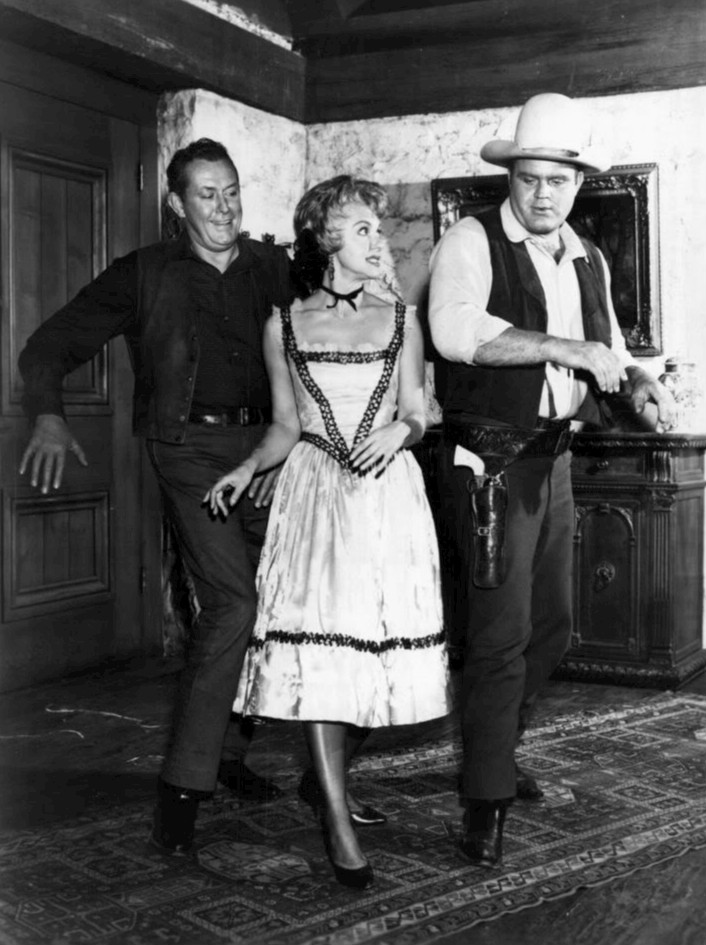
Vaughn Monroe as a guest star in a 1962 Bonanza episode

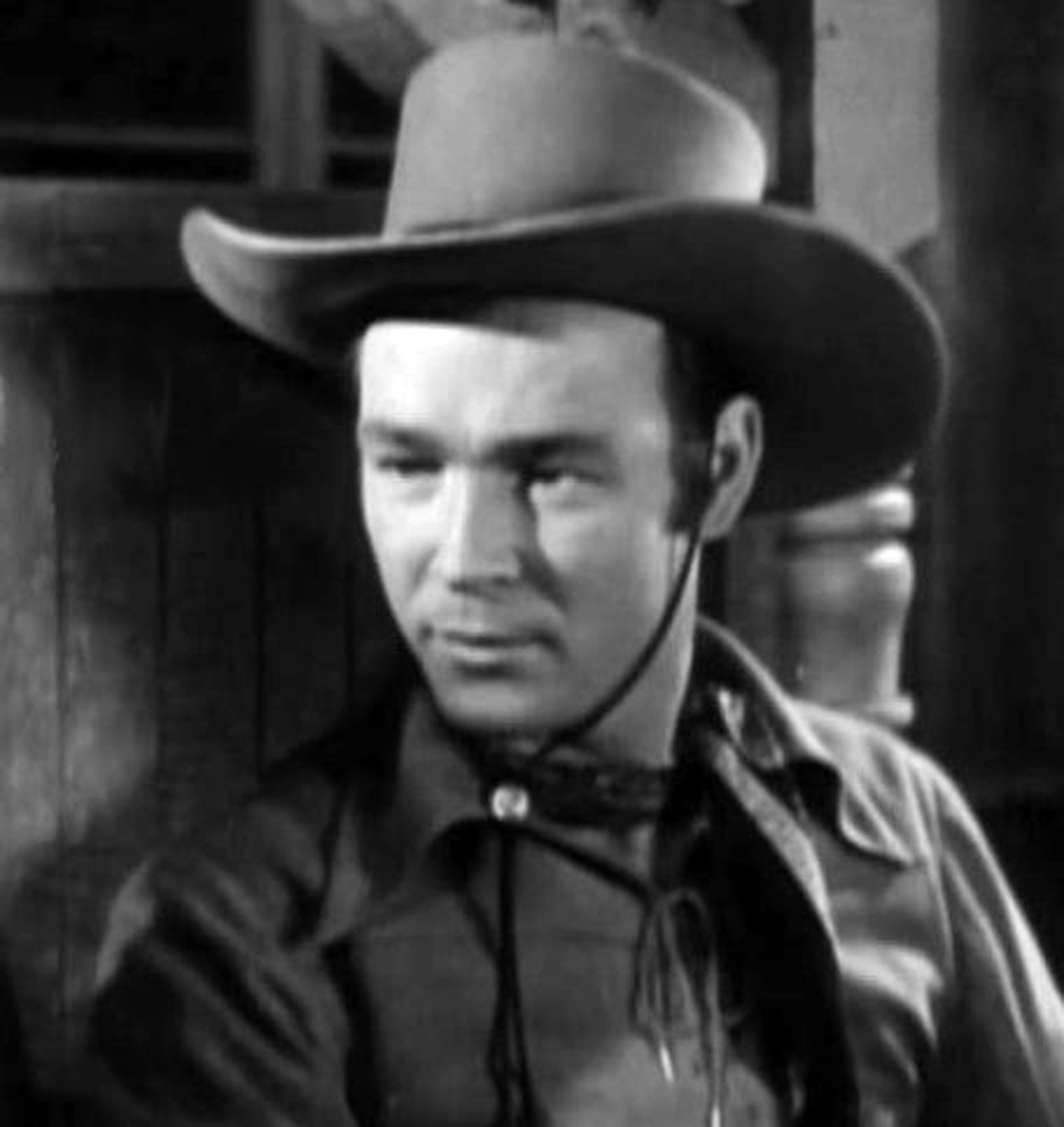
Roy Rogers

Throughout the 1930s and 1940s, cowboy songs, or Western music, became widely popular through the romanticization of the cowboy and idealized depictions of the west in Hollywood films. Singing cowboys, such as Roy Rogers and Gene Autry, sang cowboy songs in their films and became popular throughout the United States. Film producers began incorporating fully orchestrated four-part harmonies and sophisticated musical arrangements into their motion pictures.

In the post-war period, country music was called "folk" in the trades, and "hillbilly" within the industry. In 1944, The Billboard replaced the term "hillbilly" with "folk songs and blues", and switched to "country" or "country and western" in 1949.

But while cowboy and western music were the most popular styles, a new style – honky tonk – would take root and define the genre of country music for decades to come. The style meshed Western swing and blues music; featured rough, nasal vocals backed by instruments such as the guitar, fiddle, string bass, and steel guitar; and had lyrics that focused on tragic themes of lost love, adultery, loneliness, alcoholism and self-pity. One of the earliest successful practitioners of this style was Ernest Tubb, a Crisp, Texas native who had perfected his style on several Texas radio stations in the mid- to late-1930s. In 1940, he gained a recording contract with Decca Records, and a year later released his standard "Walking the Floor Over You." The single became a hit and sold over one million copies. Allmusic critic David Vinopal called "Walking the Floor Over You" the first honky tonk song that launched the musical genre itself. As the decade progressed, the style was picked up by Floyd Tillman and Hank Williams, and by the end of the 1940s was the predominant style in country music.

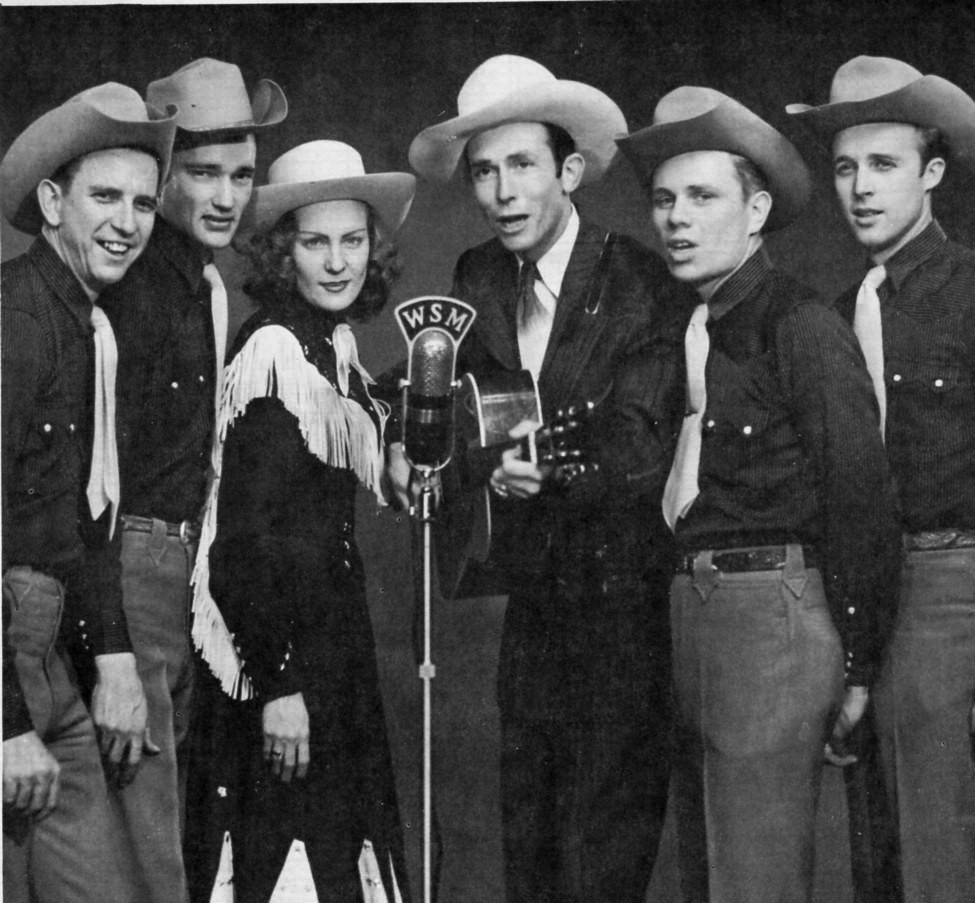
Hank Williams

Williams, a Butler County, Alabama native, began earning a reputation as both a songwriter and a performing artist. Using traditional honky-tonk themes, Williams grew to become one of the most important country performers of all time. His recording of "Lovesick Blues" (and its flip side, "I'm So Lonesome I Could Cry") in 1949 remains a landmark in both country and popular music to this day. But even by the late 1940s, it became well known that Williams drank heavily, and his personal problems would continue to grow as the 1950s dawned. Still, his overall style inspired countless artists in country and other styles of music, including rock music, and his songs would be performed by numerous artists in many styles.

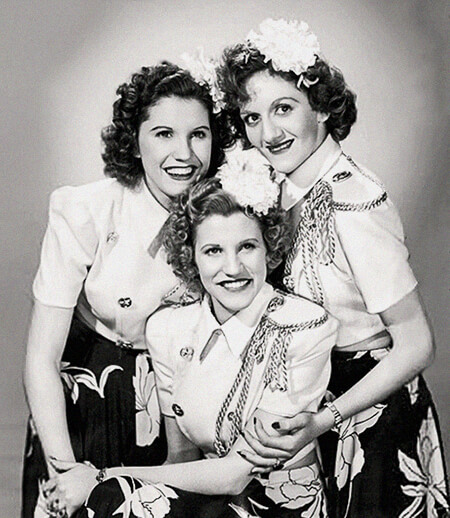
The Andrews Sisters

On August 25, 1945 Jenny Lou Carson became the first woman to write a No. 1 country music hit when "You Two-Timed Me One Time Too Often," performed by Tex Ritter, reached the top of the Billboard Most Played Juke Box Folk Records. In 1949 Carson had another No. 1 country music hit as a songwriter when "Don't Rob Another Man's Castle," performed by Eddy Arnold, topped the Billboard Folk Best Seller Charts. From 1945 to 1955 Carson was one of the most prolific songwriters in country music. Women weren't absent from the scene as vocalists; in fact, the No. 1 song on Billboard magazine's very first Most Played Juke Box Folk Records chart, dated January 8, 1944, saw The Andrews Sisters get co-credit along with Bing Crosby on "Pistol Packin' Mama." In 1949, Margaret Whiting teamed with Jimmy Wakely to have a No. 1 country and pop hit, a cover of the Floyd Tillman song "Slippin' Around." Kitty Wells was a popular concert attraction, performing with her husband Johnnie Wright and his duet partner, Jack Anglin; and Wilma Lee Cooper was prominently featured on recordings with her husband, Stoney. Other popular female acts were Patsy Montana, Martha Carson, The Maddox Brothers and Rose, Molly O'Day with the Cumberland Mountain Folks, and Lulu Belle (of Lulu Belle and Scotty), while Mother Maybelle Carter re-formed the Carter Family with her daughters, Anita, June, and Helen and their popularity would only grow in time.

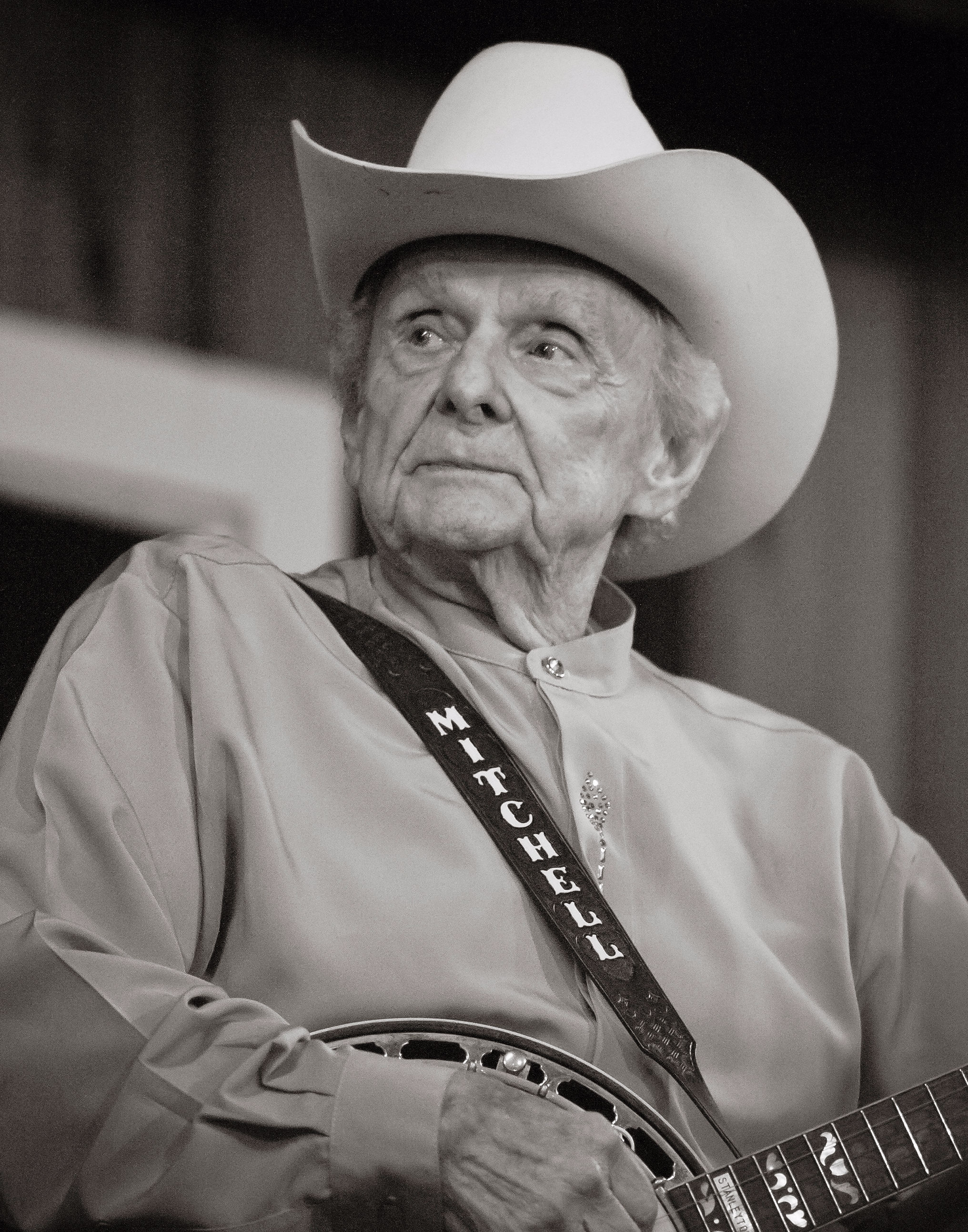
Ralph Stanley

Eddy Arnold, known as "The Tennessee Plowboy," became an innovator of crossover music, or music of one particular genre (in this case, country) that was popular among mainstream audiences. His style combined elements of refined honky tonk with popular music sounds, evident on hits like "That's How Much I Love You," "I'll Hold You In My Heart ('Til I Can Hold You In My Arms)," "Anytime" and "Boquet of Roses," and several of these songs charted on both the Billboard country and pop charts. He was so dominant that by 1948, five of that year's six No. 1 songs on Billboards' country chart bore Arnold's name, a record that Charlie Rich would tie 26 years later but otherwise has been unmatched. Arnold would go on to score more than 150 chart hits during a career that spanned until his death in 2008.

=== Other Trends ===
- In 1941 Les Paul designed and built the first solid-body electric guitar.
- In 1942 Bing Crosby recorded and released the single "White Christmas", which became the best-selling single of all time, with estimated sales in excess of 50 million copies worldwide.
- In 1948 Columbia Records introduced the 33 1/3 rpm LP ("long playing") record at New York City's Waldorf-Astoria Hotel, featuring 25 minutes of music per side.
- In 1949 RCA Victor introduced the 45 rpm record, featuring 8 minutes of music.

== Europe ==
Edith Piaf, Charles Trenet, Tino Rossi, were popular French singers. Popular music in 1940s Europe was profoundly shaped by the social, political, and emotional impact of World War II. Themes of war, ideology, love, longing, and national identity dominated the lyrical content of the period. In France, the chanson tradition flourished, with Édith Piaf emerging as a defining voice. Her songs such as "L'Accordéoniste" (1940) and "La Vie en rose" (1946) reflected both the hardships of wartime and the hopes of postwar recovery. In the United Kingdom, popular music served a morale-boosting function. Vera Lynn, known as "the Forces' Sweetheart," became emblematic of British wartime sentiment with songs like "We'll Meet Again" (1939) and "The White Cliffs of Dover" (1941), both of which conveyed messages of hope and perseverance. In Italy, Nilla Pizzi gained recognition in the late 1940s with romantic and melancholic ballads such as Addio sogni di gloria (1948) and Malinconia (1949), which resonated with a country navigating the aftermath of Fascism and war. Meanwhile, in Spain, traditional forms like flamenco and copla remained culturally significant under the Franco regime. Artists such as Concha Piquer and Manolo Caracol popularized emotionally charged songs including "Ojos verdes" and "La Niña de Fuego", which articulated themes of passion, sorrow, and national heritage. Despite censorship in several countries, American jazz and swing music maintained an underground presence, especially among youth in Nazi-occupied regions. The genre symbolized both cultural resistance and a desire for freedom. Across Europe, popular songs of the 1940s served not only as entertainment but also as a means of emotional survival, collective memory, and postwar identity reconstruction.

== Latin America ==
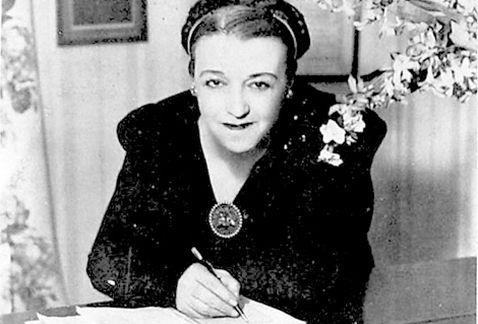
Maria Grever

The Cuban bolero had traveled to Mexico and the rest of Latin America after its conception, where it became part of their repertoires. Some of the bolero's leading composers have come from nearby countries, most especially the prolific Puerto Rican composer Rafael Hernández, Some Cuban composers of the bolero are listed under Trova. Some successful Mexican bolero composers are María Grever, Gonzalo Curiel Barba, Gabriel Ruiz, and Consuelo Velázquez which song Verdad Amarga (Bitter Truth) was the most popular in Mexico in the year 1948; another example is Mexico's Agustín Lara.

- María Grever was the first female Mexican composer to achieve international acclaim.
- Agustin Lara is recognized as one of the most popular songwriters of his era together with Consuelo Velázquez.
- Mexican artists of the time were: Juan Arvizu, Nestor Mesta Chayres, Lucha Reyes, María Luisa Landín, Fernando Fernández, and Luis Pérez Meza in the 1940s.
- In 1948 Perez Prado recorded the first Mambo in Mexico for RCA Victor
- Genoveva Jimenez was a famous Latin American musician during the late 1940s.

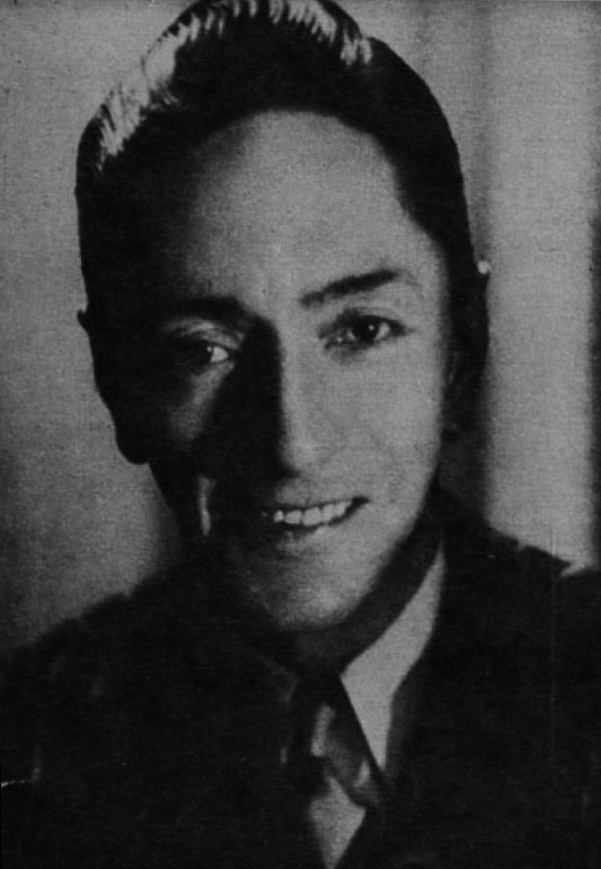
Agustin Lara

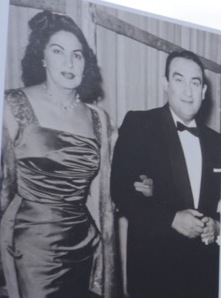
Consuelo Velázquez with Pedro Vargas

Other famous performers include Pedro Vargas, Luis Aguilar, Ana María González, Trío Calaveras, Trío Los Panchos, Eva Garza, Alfredo Antonini and John Serry

Mariachi an ensemble that consists of guitarrón, vihuela, guitar, violins and trumpets. Between 1940 mariachi and rancheras originated in the western states of the country.

This folk ensemble performs ranchera, son de mariachi, huapango de mariachi, polka, corrido, and other musical forms. It originated in the southern part of the state of Jalisco during the 19th century. The city of Guadalajara in Jalisco is known as the "Capital of Mariachi". The style is now popular throughout Mexico and the Southwestern United States, and is considered representative of Mexican music and culture.

- Jorge Negrete was Mexican actor and singer, one of the greatest actors of the Golden Age of Mexican cinema, he is considered "El Charro Cantor" (The singing charro) in Latin American countries.

== Asia ==
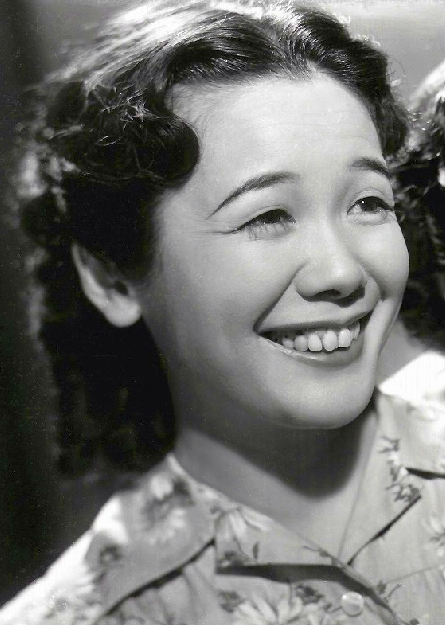
Shizuko Kasagi

In China, the 1940s was the golden era of Mandarin pop songs which were collectively termed 'Shidaiqu', literally "songs of the era". Shanghai Pathe Records, then belonging to EMI, emerged to be the leading record company in China and featured a blend of Chinese melodies and western orchestrations as well as Big Band Jazz elements in arrangements of music, leading to their superseding traditional Chinese operas in radio broadcasts. With the help of growing radio audience in the nation, Shidaiqu successfully became prevalent and listening to Mandarin pop songs was regarded as trendy. Among all Chinese contemporary singers, Zhou Xuan, Yao Li (also known as Hue Lee), Wu Yingyin, Bai Guang, Bai Hong, Gong Qiuxia and Li Xianglan were the seven most famous artists (七大歌星), who gained nationwide popularity. Zhou Xuan was the most representative of all, who later became one of the emblematic and legendary figures in the history of Chinese pop songs. In addition, despite the ravages of the Japanese occupation, there saw an immense development and maturation in the Chinese movie industry. Very often, pop songs were intermingled with episodes in films, providing the audience with multiple entertainment at one time. Nonetheless, little attention was paid on the groundbreaking breakthroughs of Chinese Mandarin pop songs in the 1940s, both by the academia and the community in China as well as Western countries. Shidaiqu had its influence even in Hong Kong and Taiwan music in the 1950s and 1960s as well as in Malaysian and Singaporean Chinese communities. Rose, Rose, I Love you, the renowned song presented by Frankie Laine, and An Autumn Melody, were two symbolic Shidaiqu.

In Japan, Nihon Columbia and Nihon Victor were two of the larger record companies. Blues, boogie-woogie and jazz were popular. Ryouichi Hattori was a popular composer, and Shizuko Kasagi was one of the popular singers.

== See also ==
- 1950s in music
