= 1945–1960 in Western fashion =

1945–1960 in Western fashion may refer to:

- 1940s in fashion
- 1950s in fashion
