= 1970s in sociology =

- 1960s
- 1970s in sociology
- 1980s
Other topics in 1970s:
- Anthropology
- Comics
- Fashion
- Motorsport
- Music
- Science and technology
- Television
- Video games

The following events related to sociology occurred in the 1970s.

== 1970 ==
- Robert Adrey's Social Contract is published.
- Jean Baudrillard's The Consumer Society: Myths and Structures is published.
- Thomas R. Dye's and L. Harmon Zeigler's Irony of democracy is published.
- Michel Foucault's The Order of Discourse is published.
- Alvin Ward Gouldner's The Coming Crisis of Western Sociology is published.
- Germaine Greer's The Female Eunuch is published.
- Donald MacRae's New Society is published.
- Nicos Poulantzas' Fascism and Dictatorship is published.
- John Rex's Race relations in sociological theory is published.
- Richard Sennett's Families Against the City: Middle Class Homes of Industrial Chicago, 1872-1890 is published.
- Richard Titmuss' The Gift Relationship is published.

== 1971 ==
- Erving Goffman's Relations in Public is published.
- György Lukács' History and Class Consciousness (last edition) is published.
- Frank Parkin's Class Inequality and Political Order: Social Stratification in Capitalist and Communist Societies is published.
- Talcott Parsons' The System of Modern Societies is published.
- Frances Fox Piven's and Richard Cloward's Regulating the poor; the functions of public welfare is published.
- Henry S. Shryock's and Jacob S. Siegel's The Methods and Materials of Demography is published.
- William H. Sewell serves as president of the ASA.

=== Deaths ===
June 4 - György Lukács

== 1972 ==
- Stanley Cohen's Folk Devils and Moral Panics is published.
- Andre Gunder Frank's Lumpenbourgeoisie: Lumpendevelopment is published.
- Karl Popper's Objective Knowledge is published.
- Michael Young's Is equality a dream is published.
- William J. Goode serves as president of the ASA.

== 1973 ==
- Jean Baudrillard's The Mirror of Production is published.
- Ernest Becker's The Denial of Death is published.
- Daniel Bell's The Coming of Post-Industrial Society is published.
- Raymond Boudon's Mathematical structures of social mobility is published.
- James Coleman's The Mathematics of Collective Activity is published.
- Shmuel Noah Eisenstadt's Traditional patrimonialism and modern neopatrimonialism is published.
- Shmuel Noah Eisenstadt's Tradition, change, and modernity is published.
- Alvin Ward Gouldner's For Sociology is published.
- David V. Glass' Numbering the People is published.
- Steven Goldberg's The Inevitability of Patriarchy is published.
- Friedrich Hayek's Law, Legislation and Liberty is published.
- Jacques Lacan's The Four Fundamental Concepts of Psychoanalysis is published.
- John Rex's Discovering sociology : studies in sociological theory and method is published.
- Peter Willmott's and Michael Young's Symmetrical family; a study of work and leisure in the London region is published.

== 1974 ==
- Raymond Boudon's Education, opportunity, and social inequality : changing prospects in Western society is published.
- Harry Braverman's Labour and Monopoly Capital; the Degradation of Work in the Twentieth Century is published.
- Oliver Cox's Jewish Self-Interest in Black Pluralism is published.
- Erving Goffman's Frame Analysis is published.
- Nicos Poulantzas' Classes in contemporary Capitalism is published.
- Wilhelm Reich's The Sexual Revolution is published.
- Immanuel Wallerstein's The Modern World-System (Volume 1): Capitalist Agriculture and the Origins of the European World-Economy in the Sixteenth Century is published.
- Peter M. Blau serves as president of the ASA.
- Last meeting of the London Positivist Society

=== Deaths ===
- March 6 - Ernest Becker

== 1975 ==
- Randall Collins' Conflict Sociology is published.
- Michel Foucault's Discipline and Punish is published.
- Paul Feyerabend's Against Method is published.
- Ian Hacking's The Emergence of Probability is published.
- Ian Hacking's Why Does Language Matter to Philosophy? is published.
- Charles Tilly's (ed.) The Formation of National States in Western Europe is published.
- Nicos Poulantzas' Crisis of Dictatorships is published.
- John Westergaard's and Henrietta Resler's Class in a capitalist society : a study of contemporary Britain is published.

== 1976 ==
- Jean Baudrillard's Symbolic exchange and Death is published.
- Thomas R. Dye's Who's running America? : Institutional leadership in the United States is published.
- Michel Foucault's The Will to Knowledge is published.
- Anthony Giddens' The New Rules of the Sociological Method is published.
- Morris Janowitz's Social Control and the Welfare State is published.
- Edmund Leach's Culture and Communication is published.
- Stuart Hall's and Tony Jefferson's (eds.) Resistance through Rituals is published.
- Roy Wallis' The Road to Total Freedom is published.

== 1977 ==
- Colin Crouch's Class conflict and the industrial relations crisis : compromise and corporatism in the policies of the British state is published.
- Frances Fox Piven's and Richard Cloward's Poor People's Movements: Why They Succeed, How They Fail is published.
- Michael Th. Greven's Parties and political rule: the interdependence of internal-party order and democracy in the FRG is published.
- Christopher Lasch's Haven in a Heartless World is published.
- Karl Polanyi's The Livelihood of Man is published.
- John Milton Yinger serves as president of the ASA.

=== Deaths ===
- March 26 - Will Herberg
- June 18 - Ali Shariati

== 1978 ==
- Arnaldo Bagnasco's, Marcello Messori's and Carlo Trigilia's Problematiche dello sviluppo italiano is published.
- Paul Feyerabend's Science in a Free Society is published.
- Ernest Gellner's State and Society in Soviet Thought is published.
- Stuart Hall's, Charles Critcher's, Tony Jefferson's, Brian Robert's and John Clarke's Policing the Crisis is published.
- Morris Janowitz's The Last Half-Century is published.
- Nicos Mouzelis's Modern Greece Facets of Underdevelopment is published.
- Nicos Poulantzas' State, Power and Socialism is published.
- Amos H. Hawley serves as president of the ASA.

== 1979 ==
- Pierre Bourdieu's Distinction: A Social Critique of the Judgment of Taste is published.
- Michael Burawoy's Manufacturing Consent is published.
- Ralf Dahrendorf's Life Chances is published.
- Reestablishment of Sociology in China.
- Christopher Lasch's The Culture of Narcissism is published.
- Jean-François Lyotard's The Postmodern Condition is published.
- Michel Maffesoli's The Present Conquest is published.
- Michel Maffesoli's Total Violence: Essay on Political Anthropology is published.
- Theda Skocpol's States and Social Revolutions is published.
- Viviana Zelizer's Morals and Markets: The Development of Life Insurance Policies in the United States is published.
- Hubert M. Blalock, Jr. serves as president of the ASA.
