= 1980s in sociology =

- 1970s
- 1980s in sociology
- 1990s
Other topics in 1980s:
- Anthropology
- Comics
- Fashion
- Motorsport
- Music
- Science and technology
- Television
- Video games

The following events related to sociology occurred in the 1980s.

== 1980 ==
- Raymond Boudon's Crisis in sociology : problems of sociological epistemology is published.
- William Catton's Overshoot is published.
- Michel Foucault's Power/Knowledge is published.
- Richard Sennett's Authority is published.
- Immanuel Wallerstein's The Modern World-System (volume 2): Mercantilism and the Consolidation of the European World-Economy, 1600-1750

== 1981 ==
- Raymond Boudon's Logic of social action : an introduction to sociological analysis is published.
- Andre Gunder Frank's Crisis in the third world is published.
- Erving Goffman's Forms of Talk is published.
- Jürgen Habermas's The Theory of Communicative Action is published.
- Thomas Humphrey Marshall's The Right of Welfare and Other Essays is published.
- Leslie George Scarman's Brixton disorders 10–12 April 1981 : report of an enquiry is published.
- Alain Touraine's La Voix et le Regard is published.
- Michel Wieviorka establishes the Centre d'Analyses et d'Interventions Sociologique (CADIS)

== 1982 ==
- Raymond Boudon's and François Bourricaud's Dictionnaire critique de la sociologie is published.
- Centre for Contemporary Cultural Studies' The Empire Strikes Back: Race and Racism in 70s Britain is published.
- Colin Crouch's Trade unions: the logic of collective action is published.
- Andre Gunder Frank's Dynamics of the Global Crisis is published.
- Edmund Leach's Social Anthropology is published.
- Doug McAdam's Political Process and the Development of the Black Insurgency 1930-1970 is published.
- Ralph Miliband's Capitalist Democracy in Britain is published.
- Karl Popper's Quantum Theory and the Schism in Physics is published.
- Rosalind H. Williams' Dream Worlds is published.
- Erving Goffman serves as president of the American Sociological Association.

=== Deaths ===
- November 19: Erving Goffman

== 1983 ==
- Benedict Anderson's Imagined Communities is published.
- Raymond Aron's Clausewitz is published.
- Ernest Gellner's Nations and Nationalism is published.
- Ian Hacking's Representing and Intervening is published.
- Sandra Harding's and Merrill B. Hintikka's (eds.) Discovering Reality is published.
- Sal Restivo's The Social Relations of Physics, Mysticism, and Mathematics is published
- Morris Janowitz's The Reconstruction of Patriotism is published.
- Jean-François Lyotard's The Differend is published.
- Ralph Miliband's Class, Power and State Power is published.
- Jean-Luc Nancy's La communauté désoeuvrée is published.
- Jean-Luc Nancy's L'Impératif catégorique is published.
- Alain Touraine's Solidarity: The Analysis of a Social Movement is published.
- Michael Young's Social scientist as innovator is published.
- Alice S. Rossi serves as president of the ASA.

=== Deaths ===
- October 17: Raymond Aron

== 1984 ==
- Anthony Giddens' The Constitution of Society
- Christopher Lasch's The Minimal Self is published.
- Charles Murray's Losing Ground: American Social Policy, 1950-1980 is published.
- Michael Piore's & Charles Sabel's Second industrial divide: possibilities for prosperity is published.
- Roy Wallis' The Elementary Forms of the New Religious Life is published.

== 1985 ==
- James S. Coleman's Becoming Adult in a Changing Society is published.
- Ernest Gellner's The Psychoanalytic Movement is published.
- David Harvey's Consciousness and the Urban Experience is published.
- Michel Maffesoli's Shadow of Dionysus is published.
- Neil Postman's Amusing Ourselves to Death is published.
- Jeffrey Weeks' Sexuality and its Discontents is published.
- Viviana Zelizer's Pricing the Priceless Child: The Changing Social Value of Children is published.

== 1986 ==
- Jean Baudrillard's America is published.
- Ulrich Beck's Risk Society is published.
- Raymond Boudon's Theories of social change : a critical appraisal is published.
- Fei Xiaotong and others' Small Towns in China: Functions, Problems & Prospects is published.
- Amos Hawley's Human Ecology is published.
- Gilbert Lewis' Concepts of Health and Illness in a Sepik Society is published.
- Michael Mann's Sources of Social Power (volume 1) is published.

== 1987 ==
- James Coleman's Public and Private High Schools is published.
- Sandra Harding's Feminism and Methodology is published.
- Sandra Harding's and Jean F O'Barr's Sex and Scientific Inquiry is published.
- George Homans' Certainties and Doubts is published.
- Paul Gilroy's There Ain't No Black in the Union Jack is published.
- Scott Lash's and John Urry's The End of organized capitalism is published.
- The European Amalfi Prize for Sociology and Social Sciences gives its first award to Norbert Elias for his Society of Individuals.

== 1988 ==
- Stanley Aronowitz's Science as Power is published.
- John Bowlby's A Secure Base is published.
- Frances Fox Piven's and Richard Cloward's Why Americans Don't Vote is published.
- Dick Hobbs' Doing the Business is published.
- Michel Maffesoli's The Time of the Tribes: The Decline of Individualism in Mass Society is published.
- Andrew W. Metcalfe's For freedom and dignity : historical agency and class structures in the coalfields of NSW is published.
- Serge Moscovici's La machine à faire des dieux is published and wins the European Amalfi Prize for Sociology and Social Sciences.
- Tom Schuller's and Michael Young's [ed.] Rhythms of society is published.
- Michel Wieviorka's Society and terrorism is published and wins the Bulzoni Editore Special Award.
- Herbert J. Gans serves as president of the American Sociological Association.

== 1989 ==
- Zygmunt Bauman's Modernity and the Holocaust is published and wins the European Amalfi Prize for Sociology and Social Sciences.
- Thomas Bottomore's and Robert Brym's (ed.) The Capitalist Class is published.
- Raymond Boudon's Analysis of ideology is published.
- Ralph Miliband's Class Struggle in Contemporary Capitalism is published.
- Immanuel Wallerstein's The Modern World-System (all volumes) are published.
- Joan Huber serves as president of the ASA.

=== Deaths ===
- May 29: George C. Homans
