= 1980s in science and technology =

- 1970s
- 1980s in science and technology
- 1990s
Other topics in 1980s:
- Anthropology
- Comics
- Fashion
- Motorsport
- Music
- Sociology
- Television
- Video games

This article is a summary of the 1980s in science and technology.

== Astronomy ==
- The Rings of Neptune were first discovered in 1984. The Voyager 2 spacecraft provided images of them in 1989.
- 4769 Castalia was discovered in 1989. It became the first asteroid to be viewed through radar imaging.
- The first exoplanet is discovered in 1988, though it was not confirmed until much later.

== Genetic engineering and biology ==
- 1983
  - Kary Mullis revolutionized molecular biology with his invention of the polymerase chain reaction, which required only a test tube, some reagents, a DNA template, and a source of heat.
- 1986
  - April – The first child produced from a gestational surrogacy is born. This is the first time in history that a child has been born to somebody who is not their biological mother.
- 1989
  - May 22 – The first gene transfer experiment in humans takes place, leading to full-fledged gene therapy trials by September 1990.
  - The gene responsible for the cystic fibrosis transmembrane conductance regulator was discovered. Mutations of the gene are considered causes of cystic fibrosis.
  - The kākāpō, a bird species of New Zealand, was termed a threatened species. The Department of Conservation started an endangered species recovery plan for the kākāpō in 1989.
  - The Cretaceous–Paleogene (K–Pg) extinction event, when dinosaurs became extinct, was shown to be linked to excess iridium in the boundary layer, which implied that the cause was a massive meteor strike.

== Computer science and networking ==
- 1980
  - Development of ENQUIRE and MS-DOS begin.
- 1981
  - MS-DOS debuts.
- 1982
  - The first compact discs are sold, which would eventually replace the audiocassette in the 1990s.
- 1983
  - Computer "virus" terminology introduced by Fred Cohen.
  - Lotus 1-2-3 spreadsheet software launched.
- 1984
  - The Apple Macintosh is released.
  - FidoNet begins.
- 1985
  - The first domain names are registered on the Internet.
  - Windows 1.0 debuts.
- 1986
  - The TCP/IP-based NSFNET, the forerunner to the Internet, begins construction.
- 1987
  - The first popular hypermedia software, HyperCard is released by Apple.
- 1988
  - While working on networking computers at CERN, Tim Berners-Lee begins to discuss the possibility of a hyperlinked information system with his colleagues, an idea he was allowed to implement in 1990 when he created the World Wide Web.
  - Adobe Photoshop graphics editing software debuts, revolutionizing photography and the fashion industry.
  - November 2 – Robert Tappan Morris created the Morris worm, considered the first notable computer worm to be distributed via the Internet. The worm was launched from the Massachusetts Institute of Technology and caused considerable damage. In 1989, its creator became the first person indicted under the Computer Fraud and Abuse Act.
  - December – Europe obtains its first permanent connection to the Internet, by satellite between Princeton University and Stockholm, Sweden.
- 1989
  - Lotus Notes software launched.
  - June/July – MCI Mail and CompuServe gateway their email systems to the Internet, instantly allowing hundreds of thousands of their users the ability to email people on the Internet for the first time.
  - The first commercial internet service providers emerge, with The World STD being the first dial-up Internet service in November.

== See also ==
- History of science and technology
- List of science and technology articles by continent
- List of years in science
