= 1970s in motorsport =

- 1960s
- 1970s in motorsport
- 1980s
Other topics in 1970s:
- Anthropology
- Comics
- Fashion
- Music
- Science and technology
- Sociology
- Television
- Video games

This article documents the events in motorsport that happened in the 1970s.

== United States ==
- The IMSA GT Championship begins in 1971
- The Trans Am Series declines as the muscle car sees its demise after the Oil Crisis. It eventually adopts an IMSA GTO format.
- The Can Am Series folds by mid decade due to the Oil Crisis and dominance of McLaren and Chevrolet. It is revived in 1977 based on Formula 5000, but folds shortly afterward.
- Formula 5000 continues to be popular until mid-decade, when it declines into the basis for the new Can-Am
- The Grand National becomes the Winston Cup Series after a purchase from Winston Cigarettes. Due to the Oil Crisis it is forced to allow even more modifications to its cars, beginning the departure from its strictly stock roots.
- Championship Automobile Racing Teams is established, creating the first IndyCar Series.
- The beginning of NASCAR legend Dale Earnhardt's long career.
- Drag racing legend John Force debuts
- short track legend Dick Trickle debuts, going on to win a record 1,200 races.
- NASCAR legend Terry Labonte makes his debut
- Mario Andretti won the Formula One drivers championship, the only American to do so thus far

== South America ==
- The Brazilian Grand Prix is first held.

== Europe ==
- The World Rally Championship is established
- The BMW 3-Series is introduced
- The Swedish Grand Prix debuts in 1973 and lasts for only six years.
- Famous racing team Brumos Porsche is founded
- F1 legend Niki Lauda makes his debut

== Asia ==
- The Japanese Grand Prix is first held.
- The Datsun 240Z becomes successful in IMSA GT

== See also ==
- 1960s in motorsport
- 1980s in motorsport
