= 1980s in motorsport =

- 1970s
- 1980s in motorsport
- 1990s
Other topics in 1980s:
- Anthropology
- Comics
- Fashion
- Music
- Science and technology
- Sociology
- Television
- Video games

This page documents some of the events that happened in motorsport in the 1980s.

== United States ==
- The IMSA GTP class debuted based on the FIA Group C prototypes, which saw great advances in technology
- The debut of IndyCar legend Al Unser Jr. in open-wheel racing.
- The US has several Formula One races throughout the decade alongside the one at Watkins Glen International. They have events at Long Beach Street Circuit, Detroit Street Circuit, Las Vegas Street Circuit, and Dallas Street Circuit. This would be a contributor to the event being dropped in 1992.
- Riverside International Raceway closes after over 30 years
- The SCCA World Challenge is established. One of the eventual competitive teams is RealTime Racing, debuting in 1987.
- The CART IndyCar Series introduces the Detroit Grand Prix on the streets of Detroit, Michigan. It is held until 2001 and then revived in 2007.
- Rocketsports Racing is founded by Paul Gentilozzi. Gentilozzi goes on to dominate Trans Am to the extent where he breaks every wins record for the series, pushing Trans Am into a several year hiatus.
- Laguna Seca Raceway remodels into a new 2.25 mile configuration from the original two mile. This was done to retain the motorcycle event.

== Europe ==
- The San Marino Grand Prix at Imola is first held in order to have two F1 races in Italy.
- The European Grand Prix is first held. The inaugural event is at Brands Hatch, allowing for two events in Britain.
- The Hungarian Grand Prix is first held.
- The Dutch Grand Prix is discontinued in 1985 after thirty events. It is not held again until 2021.
- The Austrian Grand Prix was dropped in 1987. It is not held again for ten years.
- The Portuguese Grand Prix returns in 1984 after nearly 25 years. It is held until 1996.
- The Swiss Grand Prix returns after almost thirty years as a one-time event held in Dijon, France.
- The Audi 90 Quattro dominates in both IMSA GTO and the Trans Am Series for years.
- Formula One reduces the displacement limit back to 1.5 liters.
- The DTM debuts in Germany
- F1 legend Alain Prost makes his debut

== South Pacific ==
- The Australian Grand Prix is first held

== Central America ==
- The Mexican Grand Prix returns in 1986 after a sixteen-year hiatus.

== South America ==
- The IndyCar Series introduces the Gran Premio Tecate. It is held until 2007.
- The Argentine Grand Prix is dropped in 1981. It is not held again until 1995.
- The debut of Formula One legend Ayrton Senna
- The debut of Formula One legend Alain Prost

== Asia ==
- The Japanese Grand Prix returns in 1987 after a ten-year hiatus
- Asian manufacturers begin to dominate grand tourer racing. These include the Toyota Supra and Acura NSX.

== Africa ==
- The South African Grand Prix is dropped in 1986 after almost 25 years. It will not return until 1992.

== See also ==
- 1990s in motorsport
- 1970s in motorsport
