= 1980s in comics =

- 1970s
- 1980s in comics
- 1990s
Other topics in 1980s:
- Anthropology
- Fashion
- Motorsport
- Music
- Science and technology
- Sociology
- Television
- Video games

This article lists major events in the field of comics during the 1980s.

Publications: 1980 - 1981 - 1982 - 1983 - 1984 - 1985 - 1986 - 1987 - 1988 - 1989

== Publications ==
=== 1982 ===
- Akira by Katsuhiro Otomo debuts in Young Magazine.

=== 1983 ===
==== March ====
- March 3: The Adventures of Tintin creator Hergé dies at age 75.

==== October ====
- American Flagg! by Howard Chaykin debuts.

=== 1984 ===
- Marvel Super Heroes Secret Wars debuts, published by Marvel Comics and written by Jim Shooter. Secret Wars was the first of a new breed of large crossover events which would become a staple of both Marvel and DC Comics publishing schedule from that year on.
- Spider-Man's black costume first appears in The Amazing Spider-Man #252, after the character returns from Secret Wars. The black costume would eventually tie into the origin of the popular supervillain Venom.
- Teenage Mutant Ninja Turtles premiers at a comic book convention in Portsmouth, New Hampshire, published by Mirage Studios. Originally conceived by Kevin Eastman and Peter Laird as a one-off parody, the comic's popularity has gone on to inspire several television series, numerous video games, four feature films, and a wide range of toys and merchandise.
- Dragon Ball, by Akira Toriyama, debuts in Weekly Shōnen Jump.

=== 1985 ===
- Crisis on Infinite Earths debuts, produced by DC Comics to simplify their then-55-year-old continuity. The series was written by Marv Wolfman, and illustrated by George Pérez (pencils/layouts), with Mike DeCarlo, Dick Giordano, and Jerry Ordway (who shared inking/embellishing chores). The series eliminated the concept of the Multiverse in the fictional DC Universe and killed off numerous long-standing characters, including Supergirl and the Flash.

=== 1986 ===
- The Man of Steel, a six-issue comic book limited series written and penciled by John Byrne, inked by Dick Giordano and published by DC Comics, debuts. The mini-series was designed to revamp the Superman mythos, using the history-altering effects of Crisis on Infinite Earths as an explanation for numerous changes to previous continuity.
- Batman: The Dark Knight Returns, a four-issue comic book limited series written and drawn by Frank Miller and published by DC Comics, debuts. It reintroduced Batman to the general public as the psychologically dark character of his original 1930s conception, and helped to usher in an era of "grim and gritty" superheroes from the mid-1980s to mid-1990s.
- Watchmen, a twelve-issue comic book limited series written by Alan Moore, illustrated by Dave Gibbons and published by DC Comics, debuts. To date, Watchmen remains the only graphic novel to win a Hugo Award, and is also the only graphic novel to appear on Time Magazine's 2005 list of "the 100 best English-language novels from 1923 to the present."

=== 1987 ===
- British comics artist Joe Colquhoun dies at c. age 60.
- Peter Parker marries Mary Jane Watson in Amazing Spider-Man Annual #21.

==== February ====
- Long-time Superman artist Wayne Boring dies at age 81.
- February 20: Blake and Mortimer creator Edgar P. Jacobs dies at age 82.

==== June ====
- Marvel Comics editor-in-chief Jim Shooter is fired by the company, succeeded by Tom DeFalco.

==== Initial appearances by character name ====
- Arnold Flass, in Batman #404 (March, DC Comics)

== See also ==
- 1970s in comics
- other events of the 1980s
- 1990s in comics
- List of years in comics
