= 1970s in anthropology =

- 1960s
- 1970s in anthropology
- 1980s
Other topics in 1970s:
- Comics
- Fashion
- Motorsport
- Music
- Science and technology
- Sociology
- Television
- Video games

Timeline of anthropology, 1970–1979

== Events ==
1974

- "Lucy", the first Australopithecus afarensis is discovered
- The Canadian Ethnology Association (now the Canadian Anthropology Association) is founded

1977

- The first Margaret Mead Film Festival is held

== Publications ==
1972

- Stone Age Economics, by Marshall Sahlins
- The Mountain People, by Colin Turnbull

1974

- Two-Dimensional Man : An Essay on the Anthropology of Power and Symbolism in Complex Society, by Abner Cohen
- Cows, Pigs, Wars and Witches, by Marvin Harris

1977

- Cannibals and Kings, by Marvin Harris
- Reflections on Fieldwork in Morocco, by Paul Rabinow

1979

- Portraits of "the Whiteman": Linguistic Play and Cultural Symbols among the Western Apache. by Keith Basso.

== Deaths ==
1972

- Hilma Natalia Granqvist
- Louis Leakey
- Julian Steward

1974

- Pedro Bosch-Gimpera

1977

- Kaj Birket-Smith
- Anna Hadwick Gayton

1979

- Gutorm Gjessing
- Robert Heizer
- Theodora Kroeber

== Awards ==
1979

- Margaret Mead Award: John Ogbu
