= 1970s in television =

- 1960s
- 1970s in television
- 1980s
Other topics in 1970s:
- Anthropology
- Comics
- Fashion
- Motorsport
- Music
- Science and technology
- Sociology
- Video games

The decade of the 1970s saw significant changes in television programming in both the United Kingdom and the United States. The trends included the decline of the "family sitcoms" and rural-oriented programs to more socially contemporary shows and "young, hip and urban" sitcoms in the United States and the permanent establishment of colour television in the United Kingdom.

== Overall trends ==
=== United Kingdom ===
In 1967, BBC Two had started trials of their new colour service, and it was gradually rolled out over the next few years. BBC One and ITV followed suit in 1969, so by 1970 the viewer had three colour channels from which to choose: BBC1, BBC2 and ITV. Although U.S. imports occupied a significant proportion of airtime, there was a substantial amount of high quality in-house production too.

The BBC, supported by its licence fee and with no advertisers to placate, continued fulfilling its brief to entertain and inform. The Play for Today was a continuation of the Wednesday Play which had run from the mid-1960s. As the title implied, it presented TV drama which had relevance to current social and economic issues, done in a way calculated to intrigue or even shock the viewer. As well as using established writers, it was effectively an apprenticeship for new ones who were trying to make a name for themselves; Dennis Potter, John Mortimer, Arthur Hopcraft and Jack Rosenthal all served time on Play for Today before going on to write their own independent series. In style, the plays could go from almost documentary realism (of which Cathy Come Home is the best known example) to the futuristic or surrealist (The Year of the Sex Olympics, House of Character).

Potter went on to write Pennies from Heaven, one of the landmarks of 1970s television drama. It had the now familiar elements of Potter's style: sexual explicitness, nostalgia, fantasy song and dance scenes, all overlaying a dark and pessimistic view of human motivation. The series was a success, but the BBC was not yet ready for Brimstone and Treacle, a story of the rape of a physically and mentally disabled young woman. After viewing it, the BBC's Director Of Programs Alasdair Milne, pronouncing it to be "brilliantly written ... but nauseating", withdrew it, and it would not be shown on British television until 1987.

Things had begun to change in the 1960s, with Till Death Us Do Part, and the series continued during 1972–75. The rantings of Alf Garnett on race, class, religion, education and anything else at all definitely touched a nerve. Although the show was in fact poking fun at right-wing bigotry, not everyone got the joke. Some—including, notably, Mary Whitehouse—complained about the language (although the level of profanity was quite light) and resented the racial epithets like "wog" and "coon" and the attitudes underlying them. Others, completely missing the point of the show, actually adopted Alf as their hero, thinking he was uttering truths that others didn't dare to—apparently oblivious to the fact that he never got the best of any argument and was regularly shown up to be stupid and ill-informed. The series regularly provoked controversy in the media, and for millions it became a common gossiping point at work or in the pub.

Many British situation comedies (sitcoms) were gentle, innocent, unchallenging portrayals of middle-class life, avoiding or only hinting at controversial issues; typical examples were Happy Ever After (later succeeded by Terry and June), Sykes and The Good Life. Set in a hotel in Torquay, Fawlty Towers was a massive success for the BBC, despite only twelve episodes being made. More nostalgic in tone were Last of the Summer Wine, about the escapades of pensioners in a Yorkshire town, Dad's Army, about a Home Guard unit during World War II and It Ain't Half Hot Mum about a Royal Artillery Concert Party stationed in India/later Burma also during (and after) World War II.

A more diverse view of society was offered by series like Porridge, a comedy about prison life, and Rising Damp, set in a lodging house inhabited by two students, a lonely spinster and a lecherous landlord. Taking a softer approach to race than Till Death Us Do Part, ITV's Mind Your Language (1977–79) represented several foreign nations personified as English language students attending an evening class. Despite LWT ending the show after its third series in objection to the undeniable stereotyping, Mind Your Language did later return for a fourth series in the 1980s.

In police dramas, there was a move towards increasing realism. Dixon of Dock Green continued until 1976, but it was essentially a nostalgic look back to an earlier time when police officers were depicted as a mix of strict but fair law enforcer, and kindly social worker. On the other hand, detective series such as Softly, Softly (a spin-off from the earlier Z-Cars) began to show police work done by fallible human beings with their own personal failings and weaknesses, constantly frustrated by the constraints under which they worked. Such series showed crime at the level of petty larceny and fraud, being tackled by ordinary coppers on the beat. Serious organised crime, on the other hand, was the province of various elite units, and one show in the 1970s set a new standard. The Sweeney presented a hard, gritty picture of an armed police unit—members of Scotland Yard's elite Flying Squad. Violence was routine, as were fast car chases; Regan and Carter were hard-hitting coppers, who when they weren't catching villains were likely to be on a drunken binge or womanizing.#2323123

Although this was a truer picture of British policing, it was not always to the liking of senior police officers, who felt that the confidence of the public in the police force would be diminished as a result. In police dramas, through most of the 1970s however, corruption was rare, the detection rate was unrealistically high, and the criminals arrested were always convicted on solid evidence. Although the officers in The Sweeney were no angels, and there were occasional hints that police who inhabited a world where informants were necessary could not completely avoid compromises, these never amounted to more than turning a blind eye to minor misdemeanours. It would not be until 1978 that a police drama (the miniseries Law & Order) would depict a police officer fabricating evidence to secure a conviction, with the collusion of his colleagues.

=== United States ===
==== Long-standing trends reach the end of the road ====
At the start of the decade, long-standing trends in American television were finally reaching the end of the road. The Red Skelton Show and The Ed Sullivan Show, long-revered American institutions, were finally canceled after multi-decade spans. The "family sitcom", represented by the travails of Ozzie and Harriet Nelson in the 1950s and 1960s, saw its last breath at the start of the new decade with The Brady Bunch, which ran for five seasons. Although the show was never highly rated during its original run, it has been broadcast in syndication continuously since 1974, and many children have grown up with it, causing them to think of the Bradys as the quintessential family—not only in 1970s television, but quite possibly all of American television. In the early 1970s the high concept sitcoms like I Dream of Jeannie and Bewitched began to lose American interest with I Dream of Jeannie ending its run in 1970 and Bewitched ending in 1972.

==== The death of rural-oriented programming and the rise of "socially conscious" programming ====
In 1971; CBS, tired of being ridiculed as the "Hillbilly Network" because the majority of its hit shows were rural-oriented, cancelled The Beverly Hillbillies, Hee Haw, Green Acres and Mayberry RFD plus every show "that had a tree in it" as described by actor Pat Buttram. In its place, shows that appealed to a younger, more urban demographic became commonplace. It was transformed by what became termed as "social consciousness" programming, spearheaded by television producer Norman Lear. All in the Family, his adaptation of the British television series Till Death Us Do Part, broke down television barriers. When the series premiered in 1971, Americans heard the words "fag," "jigaboo," and "spic" on national television programming for the first time. All in the Family was the talk of countless dinner tables throughout the country; Americans hadn't seen anything like it on television before. The show became the highest-rated program on U.S. television schedules in the fall of 1971 and stayed in the top slot until 1976—to date, only one other series has tied All in the Family for such a long stretch at the top of the ratings. All in the Family spawned numerous spin-offs, such as Maude, starring Bea Arthur.

Maude was Edith Bunker's cousin and Archie's archenemy. She stood for everything liberal and was an outspoken advocate of civil rights and feminism. Like All in the Family, Maude broke new ground in television and presented American audiences with something they had never encountered on television before when Maude admitted, without guilt or shame, to planning to have an abortion. Maude felt most comfortable, however, hiring a black woman as her housekeeper. Maude's housekeeper, Florida Evans (played by Esther Rolle), was given her own television series in 1974, Good Times, which proved to be another hit for Lear's production company. Lear developed two shows in 1975: The Jeffersons, a spin-off of All in the Family in which Archie Bunker's black next-door neighbors moved to a luxury apartment on the Upper East Side of Manhattan, and One Day at a Time, about a single mother raising her two teenage daughters in Indianapolis.

==== The decline of the western ====
With the rise in socially responsible programming, the television western, a common genre in the 1960s, slowly died out. The first casualties were The High Chaparral and The Virginian, both NBC staples, in the spring of 1971. Bonanza suffered a blow when actor Dan Blocker died during surgery in 1972, and the show quietly ended its run the next year. CBS's Gunsmoke outlasted them all, and finally ended its run with a star-studded series finale in 1975. In the meantime, Kung Fu, airing from 1972 to 1975, offered a mix of the genre with Eastern philosophy and martial arts. Bonanza actor Michael Landon was cast in the lead role of Little House on the Prairie, adapted from the children's books by Laura Ingalls Wilder. Debuting in 1974, the series ran for eight years. Little House's competitor family drama was CBS's The Waltons, which revolved around family unity but during a different time and place—Virginia during the Great Depression.

==== Medical shows ====
Medical shows in the early 1970s included Marcus Welby, M.D., the first medical drama ever to tackle many subjects on television for ABC, the same for Medical Center for CBS, those shows aired for 7 seasons. Other shows such as Emergency!, was also the first series ever to feature both the paramedic and the emergency hospital, starring Robert Fuller and Julie London, which also launched the career of Randolph Mantooth, and M*A*S*H, starring Alan Alda, focused on the days of the Korean War, combined both comedy and drama.

==== Jiggle television and crime shows ====
By the mid-to-late 1970s, viewers tired of socially responsible sitcoms. Former CBS head of programming Fred Silverman defected to struggling ABC started the trend of TV centred on sexual gratification and bawdy humor and situations, nicknamed "jiggle television." Jiggle TV shows included the crime-fighting television series Charlie's Angels, which starred up-and-coming sex symbols Farrah Fawcett, Jaclyn Smith, and Kate Jackson and the risqué sitcom such as Three's Company, modeled after the British series Man About the House, in which swinging single-man Robin Trip pretended to be gay in order to live in an apartment with two single women. Mildly controversial at the time, the show quickly became a Top Ten hit in the ratings.

The aforementioned Charlie's Angels was one of many crime shows to prosper during the 1970s. Another show, Police Woman starring Angie Dickinson, was the first show, ever to have a female lead in the title role, also became a sex symbol. Other successful TV crime dramas of the decade included The Streets of San Francisco, The Rookies, McCloud, Columbo, Barnaby Jones, The Rockford Files, Starsky & Hutch, Kojak, Switch, and, above all, Hawaii Five-O, for many years considered the longest-running police show in the history of American television. However, crime shows often came under fire during the 1970s from various groups decrying the programs' often-violent content and demanded that companies pull their ads from such programs. 1977 saw the debut of CHiPs, an action-packed police show where the cops very seldom drew their guns. One year earlier, Quincy, M.E., a mystery-crime show centered around an inquisitive medical examiner who often immersed himself in contemporary hot-button issues, had bowed on NBC.

==== Science-fiction ====
A science-fiction trend accelerated as the 1970s decade progressed. Several sci-fi shows, many of them from Universal Television, achieved long runs during this period. They included The Six Million Dollar Man, The Bionic Woman, Battlestar Galactica, Wonder Woman, The Incredible Hulk and Fantasy Island.

==== The soap opera boom ====
On U.S. television during the 1970s, the soap opera moved from being a genre watched exclusively by housewives to having a sizable audience of men (who largely watched The Edge of Night) and college students; the latter audience helped All My Children gain a devoted following, as it was on during many universities' traditional "lunch period." In a TIME article written about the genre in 1976, it was estimated that as many as 35 million households tuned into at least one soap opera each afternoon, the most successful being As the World Turns, which routinely grabbed viewing figures of twelve million or higher each day.

The soap boom spawned a nighttime soap parody, Mary Hartman, Mary Hartman, which made a quick star out of Louise Lasser, who played the eponymous heroine. A rising soap opera toward the decade's end was Ryan's Hope, which capitalized on the everyman success of the film Rocky (despite Ryan's Hope debuting earlier; the show's success came a while after the movie's release). The serial was about an Irish-American family running a pub in New York City, and earned critical acclaim from television critics for its realistic portrayal of an "ethnic" middle-class family in a contemporary setting. The show's matriarch, played by Helen Gallagher, won two Daytime Emmys by decade's end. Also during the decade General Hospital, a soap that spent most of the decade with bad ratings (It was almost canceled in 1976) saw a rise in its audience by late 1978 due to its more youthful focus. However, it would not yet become a ratings giant until the 1980s.

ABC aired Soap, a sitcom that parodied soap operas, and garnered controversy by writing in one of the first gay characters on U.S. television. Many stations refused to air the series (another storyline consisted of heroine Corinne Tate, played by Diana Canova, lusting after a priest who eventually left the priesthood to marry her). Silverman's legacy also included the escapist "fantasy" genre, which started in 1977 with The Love Boat. The series involved movie and television stars in guest roles as passengers on a luxury cruise liner that sailed up and down the Pacific Coast. Silverman followed up in 1978 with Fantasy Island, starring Ricardo Montalbán and Hervé Villechaize. Montalban and Villechaize were the owner and sidekick, respectively, of a luxury island resort where peoples' wishes came true.

==== Daytime game shows ====
Daytime television was consumed with several game shows, airing alongside soap operas during the mornings and afternoons. During the early years of the decade, The Hollywood Squares (NBC) won numerous Emmy awards. Hosted by emcee Peter Marshall, nine celebrities in a large tic-tac-toe board—among them, archetypical center square Paul Lynde—responded to miscellaneous questions. Contestants must state whether they "agree" or "disagree" with the answers and if they are correct, their "X"/"O" symbol lights up in the celebrity's box. The first to get three in a row or a five-square win succeeds and wins money. In the mid-1970s Match Game (CBS) was the highest rated game show (it was #1 among them from 1973 to 1977), in a time when there were many of them. Players must match the answers of panelists like Brett Somers and Charles Nelson Reilly.

Following the success of Match Game, the show launched a spin-off, Family Feud (ABC), a popular game show which prevailed as the #1 game show of the late 1970s. The format of the show features two families going head-to-head in assuming the most common answers to surveys of 100 people across the nation, with such questions as, "name a public figure most Americans dislike." It was a simple concept that lead to success, with interesting answers and the host Richard Dawson fueled the show's high ratings. Other successful game shows during this decade included The Price Is Right (still on the air to this day), Let's Make a Deal, The $20,000 Pyramid, The Gong Show, The Newlywed Game, Password, Tattletales, Tic Tac Dough, Bowling for Dollars, Break the Bank and The Joker's Wild.

==== Television newscasts ====
Another influential genre was the television newscast, which built on its initial widespread success in the 1960s. Each of the three television networks had widely recognizable and respected journalists helming their newscasts: CBS anchor Walter Cronkite, who was voted "The Most Trusted Man in America" many times over, led in the nightly ratings. NBC's John Chancellor and David Brinkley were a strong second, while ABC, perennially third place in the news department until the 1990s, had a newscast helmed by Howard K. Smith.

==== The rise of telefilms ====
The success of the 1971 telefilm Duel signaled the rise of movies produced specifically for television. Some featured a hero or heroine whose life was in jeopardy, while others were pilots for proposed TV series to be picked up by a network. (Some sold; many did not.) Still others centered on the destructiveness of a certain disease, whether medical or social. Roots, a multi-part miniseries that ran on a number of consecutive nights in early 1977, proved to be a huge hit in the ratings and thus paved the way for others of its kind like Shogun and The Thorn Birds.

==== Variety shows ====
The variety show suffered a decline in audiences during this decade. They continued on in the 1970s with The Carol Burnett Show. With a repertory company including Vicki Lawrence, Harvey Korman and Lyle Waggoner, the series continued to run into the mid-1970s. NBC aired a variety show of its own, starring African American comedian Flip Wilson. The Flip Wilson Show became a success and became the first show headed by an African-American comedian to become a ratings winner.

In 1971, while Fred Silverman was still working for CBS, he spotted singing duo Sonny & Cher doing a stand-up concert and decided to turn it into a weekly variety show. In addition to some entertaining stand-up banter between the husband and wife, The Sonny & Cher Comedy Hour would also have skits and music (mostly sung by Cher). The show was a ratings winner from the first episode and ran for three years. It was followed in the same vein shortly after by singing group Tony Orlando and Dawn.

Another group of singers who received a variety show in the 1970s were two of the famous singing Osmonds—Donny and his sister Marie. Sid & Marty Krofft set to work on the siblings' series and Donny & Marie premiered on ABC in the winter of 1976. Although the show was successful, the Osmonds were equally ridiculed for their wholesome image and Mormon moral reputation (on an episode of Good Times, the lead character, Florida, listed three things in the world you just can't do, and one was "smile wider than Donny and Marie").

==== Producers of 1970s television ====
Many prime-time programs of the 1970s were helmed by independent producers, often in association with a major Hollywood studio. A particularly successful independent producer at the dawn of the decade was Quinn Martin, who produced such crime shows as The Streets of San Francisco, Cannon, and Dan August (a one-season cop series starring an up-and-coming Burt Reynolds that would find a larger audience after its star had developed a film career). Martin's success would fade during the latter half of the decade, however; by the end of 1980, the erstwhile mega-producer would be left without a single prime-time network series on the air. As for other producers during the period, Norman Lear produced the socially relevant All in the Family as well as more innocuous fare such as One Day at a Time. Jack Webb, a holdover from previous decades, oversaw Adam-12 and Emergency!, the latter gaining a high reach with young children. Glen A. Larson produced a number of series in association with Universal TV (McCloud, Switch, etc.), while David Gerber made a name for himself with such fare as Police Woman and Police Story. (The latter was a one-hour anthology series with no real regulars.) Among 1970s TV producers, however, it was Aaron Spelling who would go on to be perhaps, according to an article written by Michael Idato for The Sydney Morning Herald, "the most prolific producer in TV history." Like Quinn Martin, Spelling was known for producing crime dramas (S.W.A.T., Starsky & Hutch). However, Spelling also produced more escapist fare as represented by the likes of The Love Boat, Fantasy Island, and even the private-eye opus Charlie's Angels. There was also Family, a socially relevant hour-long series which would win a number of Emmys during its four-year run. Spelling's success would continue well into the 1990s.

== Television by year ==
- 1970 in television - Monday Night Football debuts on (ABC) Mary Tyler Moore and All My Children premiere, as does the BBC Nine O'Clock News and The Goodies in the UK.
- 1971 in television - All in the Family premieres. Open University broadcasts begin on the BBC. John Chancellor becomes the sole anchor of the NBC Nightly News.
- 1972 in television - M*A*S*H and Bob Barker's The Price Is Right debut; Home Box Office becomes first pay-TV channel. Emmerdale Farm (now just called Emmerdale) premieres on ITV in the UK.
- 1973 in television - Large-screen projection color TVs hit the market in the United States. The Young and the Restless, Match Game and Pyramid begin hugely successful daytime TV runs. Last of the Summer Wine premieres on BBC1.
- 1974 in television - Happy Days premieres on ABC. Monty Python's Flying Circus ends in the UK, and comes to American TV audiences for the first time. Australian TV tests color transmissions (full-time color comes in '75.)
- 1975 in television - Saturday Night Live, Good Morning America, The Jeffersons and Wheel of Fortune premiere; Sony introduces the Betamax, a home video tape recorder; Fawlty Towers premieres in Britain on BBC2.
- 1976 in television - South Africa has television service for the first time; Family Feud premieres on ABC; UK punk group the Sex Pistols cause controversy and outrage by swearing on Today, a Thames Television regional early evening show; JVC introduces VHS, a rival home video tape recorder that outdoes Betamax and remains popular until the mid-2000s.
- 1977 in television - The miniseries Roots airs on ABC; first episode of Three's Company. Dad's Army ends on BBC1.
- 1978 in television - Dallas paves the way for the return of prime time soaps in the United States. Abarembo Shogun begins 25-year run in Japan. Grange Hill premieres on BBC1 in the United Kingdom.
- 1979 in television - 43 million viewers watch Elvis on ABC. All-sports cable channel ESPN is launched. The Pinwheel Channel changes its name to Nickelodeon. A technician's strike forces ITV off air for eleven weeks (except in the Channel Islands) while BBC2 launches the first computer generated ident in the world.
