= 1970s in comics =

- 1960s
- 1970s in comics
- 1980s
Other topics in 1970s:
- Anthropology
- Fashion
- Motorsport
- Music
- Science and technology
- Sociology
- Television
- Video games

See also: 1960s in comics, other events of the 1970s, 1980s in comics and the list of years in comics

Publications: 1970 - 1971 - 1972 - 1973 - 1974 - 1975 - 1976 - 1977 - 1978 - 1979

== Publications ==
=== 1970 ===
Jack Kirby leaves Marvel Comics to work for rival DC Comics. At DC, he creates the Fourth World mythology, introducing many new characters to the DC Universe, most notably Darkseid.

Mort Weisinger retires from DC Comics after a long tenure as editor of the Superman line during the Silver Age of comic books. He is succeeded by his longtime friend, Julius Schwartz.

Marvel Comics adapts Robert E. Howard's Conan the Barbarian into a series written by Roy Thomas.

=== 1978 ===
Cancelled Comic Cavalcade is a publication reproduced in the offices of DC Comics in very limited quantity following the "DC Implosion" in 1978 that features material originally intended for series that were abruptly cancelled.

== See also ==
- Cancelled Comic Cavalcade
- DC Implosion
- Howard the Duck
- Steve Gerber
- 1980s in comics
- other events of the 1980s
- 1990s in comics
- List of years in comics
