= 1970s in video games =

Video game-related events in 1970s

- 1970s in video games
- 1980s
Other topics in 1970s:
- Anthropology
- Comics
- Fashion
- Motorsport
- Music
- Science and technology
- Sociology
- Television

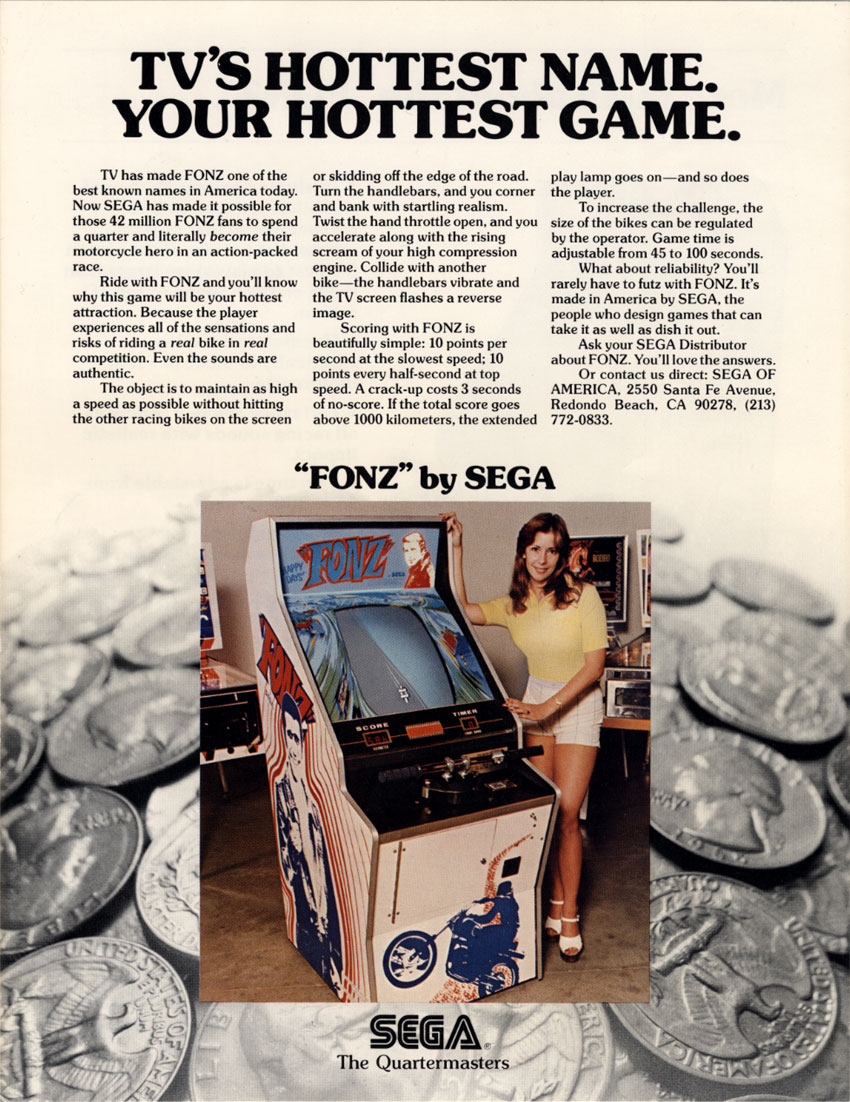
1976 flyer advertising the racing game Fonz

The 1970s were the first decade in the history of the video game industry. The 1970s saw the development of some of the earliest video games, primarily in the arcade game industry, as well as several for the earliest video game consoles and personal computers.

Notable games released in the 1970s included Computer Space, The Oregon Trail, Pong, Maze, Tank, Colossal Cave Adventure, Death Race, Sea Wolf, Breakout, Zork, Combat, Space Invaders, Lunar Lander, Galaxian, and Asteroids.

== Arcade history ==
Notable early arcade video games of the early-to-mid-1970s include Computer Space (1971), Galaxy Game (1971), Pong (1972), Space Race (1973), Gotcha (1973), Tank (1974), Speed Race (1974), Gun Fight (1975), Heavyweight Champ (1976), Fonz (1976), Night Driver (1976), Breakout (1976), Death Race (1976), Sea Wolf (1976), and Space Wars (1977).

=== Golden age of arcade video games (1978–1979) ===
Classic arcade games of the late 1970s include Space Invaders (1978), Galaxian (1979), Asteroids (1979), Barrier (1979), Speed Freak (1979), Warrior (1979), Tail Gunner (1979), and Lunar Lander (1979).

== Consoles of the 1970s ==
=== First-generation consoles (1972–1979) ===
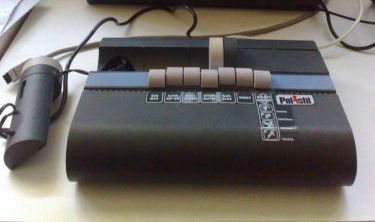
Polistil VG2 Pong clone (1978), made in Italy

The first generation of consoles were on sale between 1972 and 1980 and included the Magnavox Odyssey, Telstar, Home Pong, and Color TV-Game.

Typical characteristics of the first generation of consoles:

- Discrete transistor-based digital game logic.
- Games were native components of consoles rather than based on external or removable media.
- Entire game playfield occupies only one screen.
- Players and objects consist of very basic lines, dots or blocks.
- Colour graphics are basic (mostly black and white or other dichromatic combination; later games may display three or more colors).
- Either single-channel or no audio.
- Games had a high score based system.
- Lacked features of second generation consoles, such as microprocessor logic, ROM cartridges, flip-screen playfields, sprite-based graphics, and multi-color graphics.

=== Second-generation consoles (1976–1983) ===
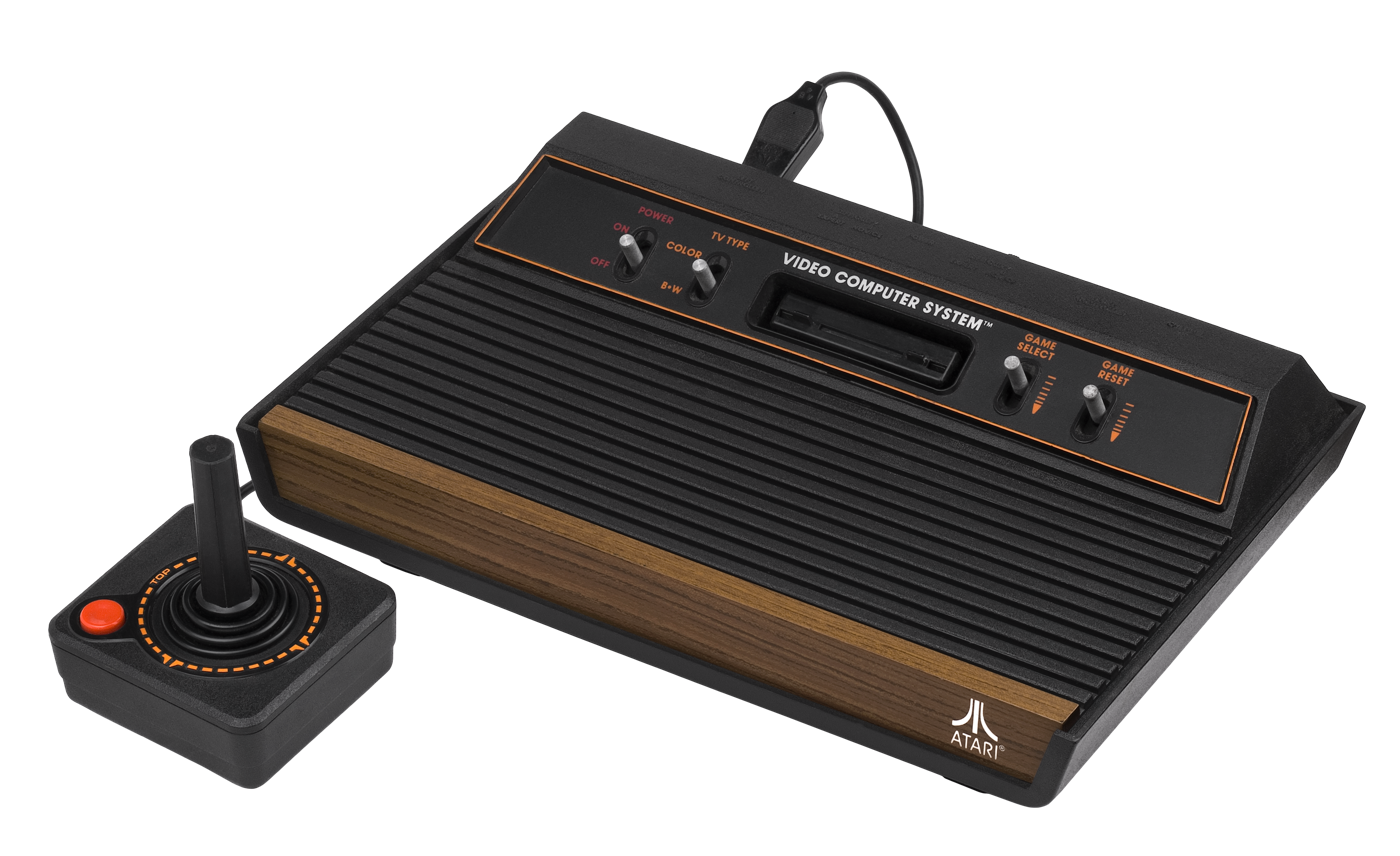
Atari 2600 (1977)

The second generation of consoles, on sale between 1976 and 1988, made several leaps forward technologically. Consoles first available in the late 1970s included the Fairchild Channel F, Atari 2600, Bally Astrocade, and Magnavox Odyssey². The first handheld console, the Microvision, was released in 1979.

Typical characteristics of the second generation of consoles:

- Microprocessor-based game logic.
- AI simulation of computer-based opponents, allowing for single-player gaming.
- ROM cartridges for storing games, allowing any number of different games to be played on one console.
- Game playfields able to span multiple flip-screen areas.
- Blocky and simplistic-looking sprites, with a screen resolution of around 160 × 192 pixels.
- Basic color graphics, generally between 2-color (1-bit) and 16-color (4-bit).
- Up to three channel audio.
- Lacked features of third-generation consoles, such as scrolling tile-based playfields.

== Notable video game franchises established in the 1970s ==
=== Arcade ===
- 280 ZZZAP (1976)
- The Amazing Maze Game (1976)
- Anti-Aircraft (1975)
- Asteroids (1979)
- Astro Fighter (1979)
- Barrier (1979)
- Blockade (1976)
- Breakout (1976)
- Canyon Bomber (1977)
- Circus (1977)
- Computer Space (1971)
- Crash 'N Score (1975)
- Death Race (1976)
- Destruction Derby (1975)
- F-1 (1976)
- Fire Truck (1978)
- Fonz (1976)
- Football (1978)
- Galaxian (1979)
- Galaxy Wars (1979)
- Gee Bee (1978)
- Gotcha (1973)
- Gran Trak 10 (1974)
- Gun Fight (1975)
- Head On (1979)
- Heavyweight Champ (1976)
- Hi-way (1975)
- Indy 4 (1976)
- Indy 800 (1975)
- Jet Fighter (1975)
- LeMans (1976)
- Lunar Lander (1979)
- Night Driver (1976)
- Pong (1972)
- Rebound (1974)
- Sea Wolf (1976)
- Shark Jaws (1975)
- Sheriff (1979)
- Space Invaders (1978)
- Space Race (1973)
- Space Wars (1977)
- Speed Freak (1979)
- Speed Race (1974)
- Sprint (1976)
- Star Fire (1978)
- Steeplechase (1975)
- Stunt Cycle (1976)
- Super Breakout (1978)
- Super Bug (1977)
- Tank (1974)
- Tail Gunner (1979)
- Warrior (1979)

=== Home computers and console ===
- Battlestar Galactica^{1} (1978)
- Combat (1977)
- Empire (1977)
- dnd (1975)
- Flight Simulator (1979)
- The Oregon Trail (1971)
- Sargon (1978)
- Superman^{1} (1979)
- Star Trek^{1} (1979)
- Star Wars^{1} (1979)
- Zork (1977)

Notes:

- ^{1} Game franchises that also accompany major film or television franchises.

== Financial performance ==
=== Best-selling arcade games of the decade ===
The following titles were the best-selling arcade games of each year in the 1970s.

Year	Region(s)	Type	Title	Cabinet sales	Revenue	Inflation	Developer	Manufacturer(s)	Genre	Ref
1979	Worldwide	—N/a	Space Invaders	750,000	$1,000,000,000+	$4,900,000,000+	Taito	Taito / Midway	Shoot 'em up	
1978	Worldwide	—N/a	Space Invaders	750,000	$1,000,000,000+	$4,900,000,000+	Taito	Taito / Midway	Shoot 'em up	
1977	Japan	Electro-mechanical	F-1	Unknown	Unknown	Unknown	Namco	Namco	Racing	
1977	Japan	Medal game	EVR Race	Unknown	Unknown	Unknown	Nintendo	Nintendo	Racing	
1977	Japan	Video game	Speed Race DX	Unknown	Unknown	Unknown	Taito	Taito	Racing	
1977	US	—N/a	Sea Wolf	10,000	Unknown	Unknown	Dave Nutting Associates	Midway	Shooter	
1976	US	—N/a	Sea Wolf	10,000	Unknown	Unknown	Dave Nutting Associates	Midway	Shooter	
1976	Japan	Electro-mechanical	F-1	Unknown	Unknown	Unknown	Namco	Namco	Racing	
1976	Japan	Medal game	EVR Race	Unknown	Unknown	Unknown	Nintendo	Nintendo	Racing	
1976	Japan	Video game	Ball Park (Tornado Baseball)	Unknown	Unknown	Unknown	Midway Manufacturing	Taito	Sports	
1975	US	Video game	Wheels / Wheels II (Speed Race)	10,000	Unknown	Unknown	Taito	Midway	Racing	
1974	US	Video game	Tank	10,000	Unknown	Unknown	Kee Games	Kee Games / Atari	Maze	
1973	US	Video game	Pong	8,000	$11,000,000	$80,000,000	Atari, Inc.	Atari, Inc.	Sports	
1972	US	Video game	Computer Space	200	Unknown	Unknown	Syzygy Engineering	Nutting Associates	Space combat	

=== Best-selling home systems of the decade ===
Rank	System	Release	Manufacturer	Type	Generation	Sales	As of	Ref
1	Nintendo Color TV Game	1977	Nintendo	Console	First	2,000,000	1979	
2	Atari Video Computer System (Atari VCS)	1977	Atari, Inc.	Console	Second	1,550,000	1979	
3	Coleco Telstar	1976	Coleco	Console	First	1,000,000	1976	
4	TRS-80	1977	Texas Instruments	Computer	8-bit	450,000	1979	
5	Magnavox Odyssey	1972	Magnavox	Console	First	367,000	1975	
6	Fairchild Channel F	1976	Fairchild Camera and Instrument	Console	Second	350,000	1979	
7	Epoch TV Baseball	1978	Epoch Co.	Console	First	230,000	1979	
8	Epoch TV Game System 10	1977	Epoch Co.	Console	First	200,000	1979	
9	Home Pong	1975	Atari, Inc.	Console	First	150,000	1975	
9	NEC PC-8001	1979	NEC	Computer	8-bit	150,000	1979	

== Hardware timeline ==
The following gallery highlights hardware used to predominantly play games throughout the 1970s.

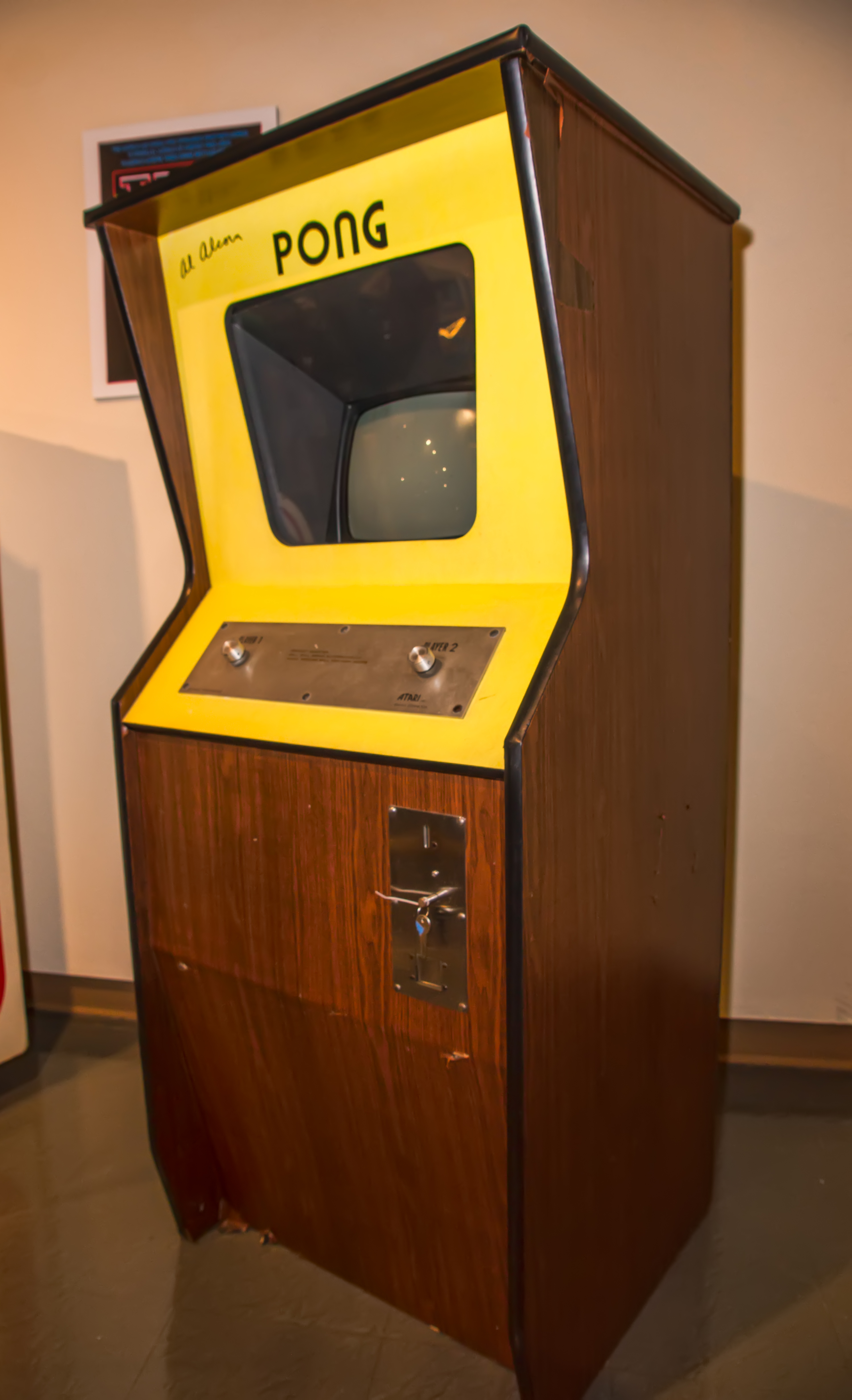
Pong arcade machine (1972)

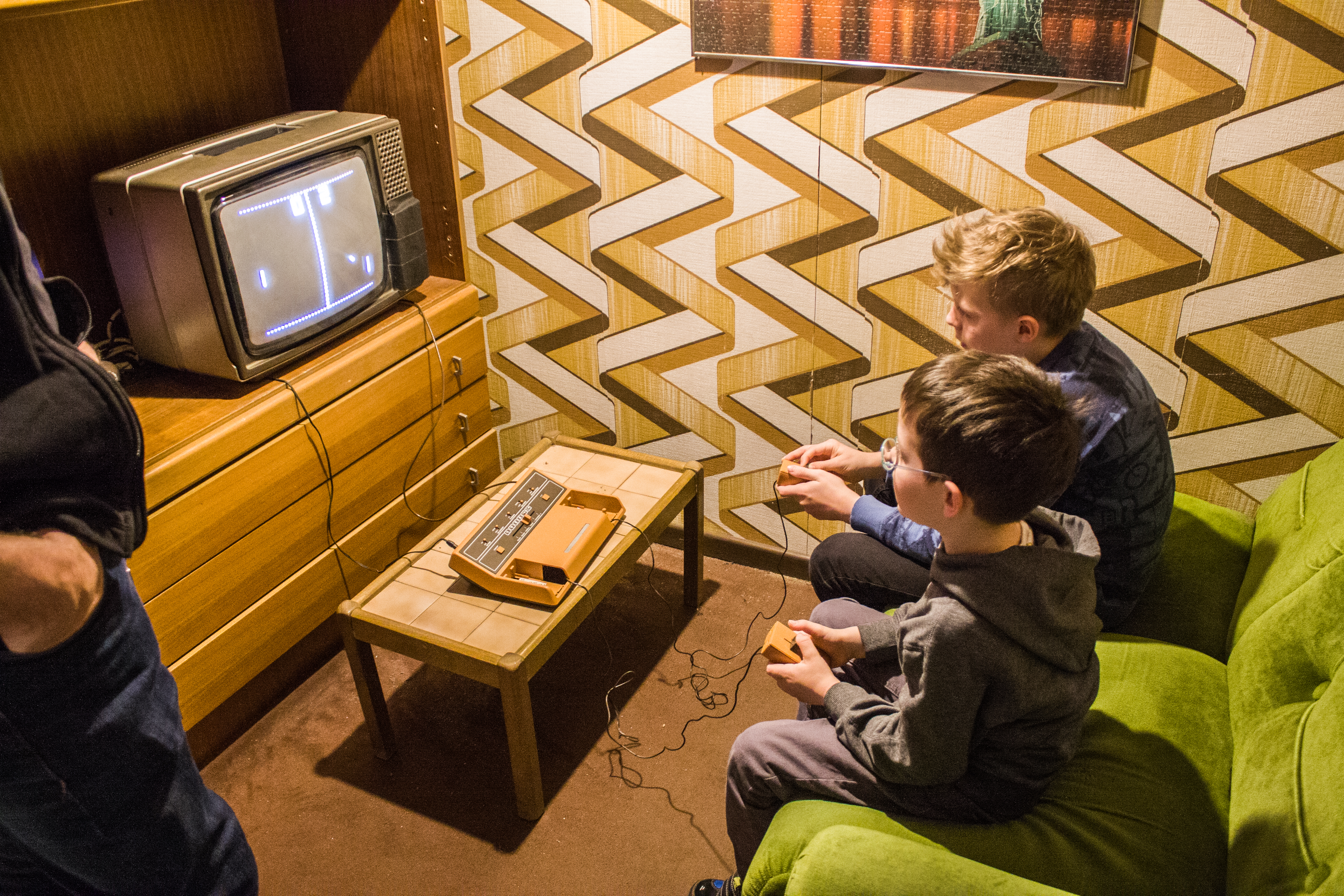
Home Pong console (museum recreation)

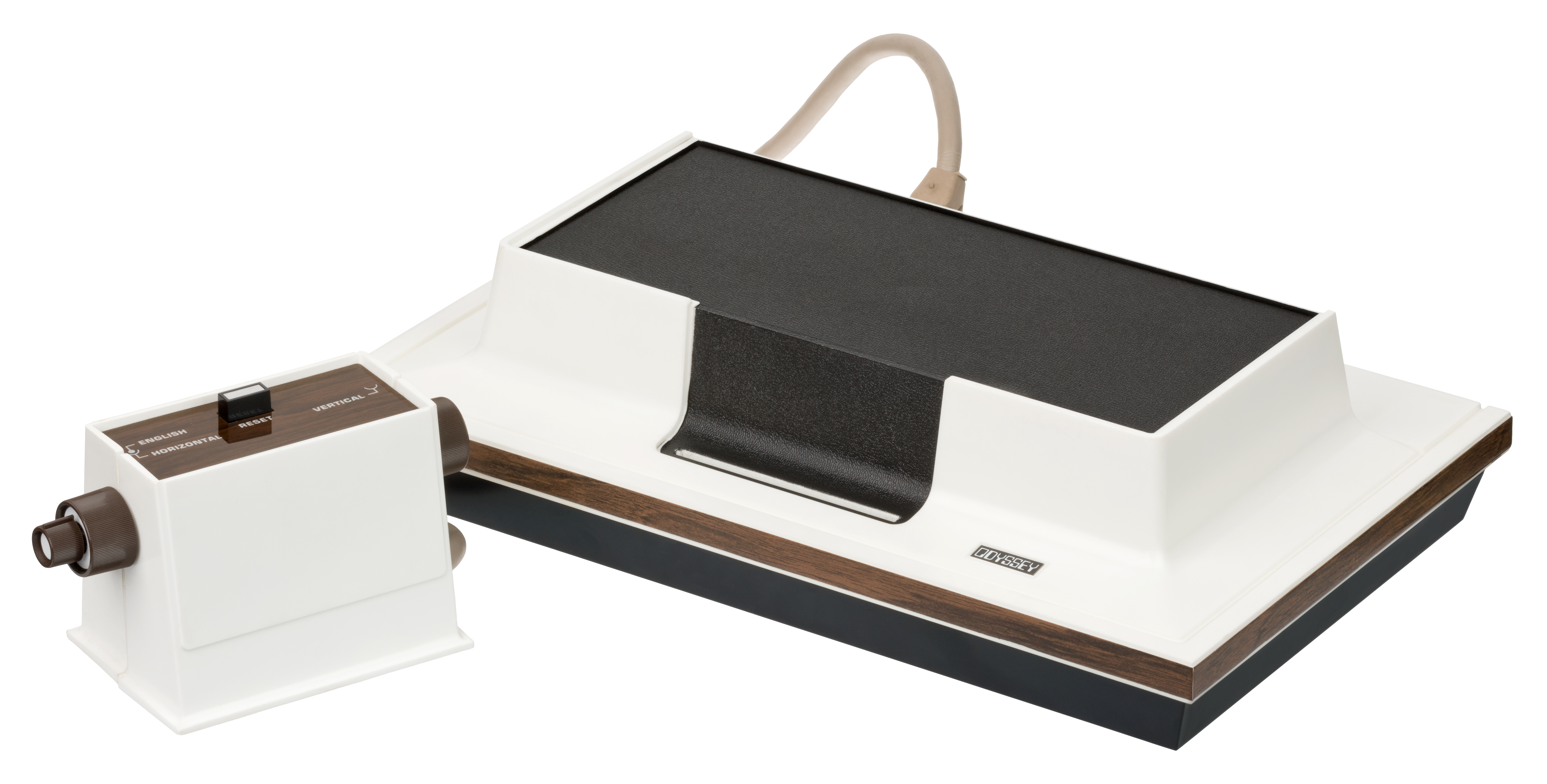
Magnavox Odyssey (1972)

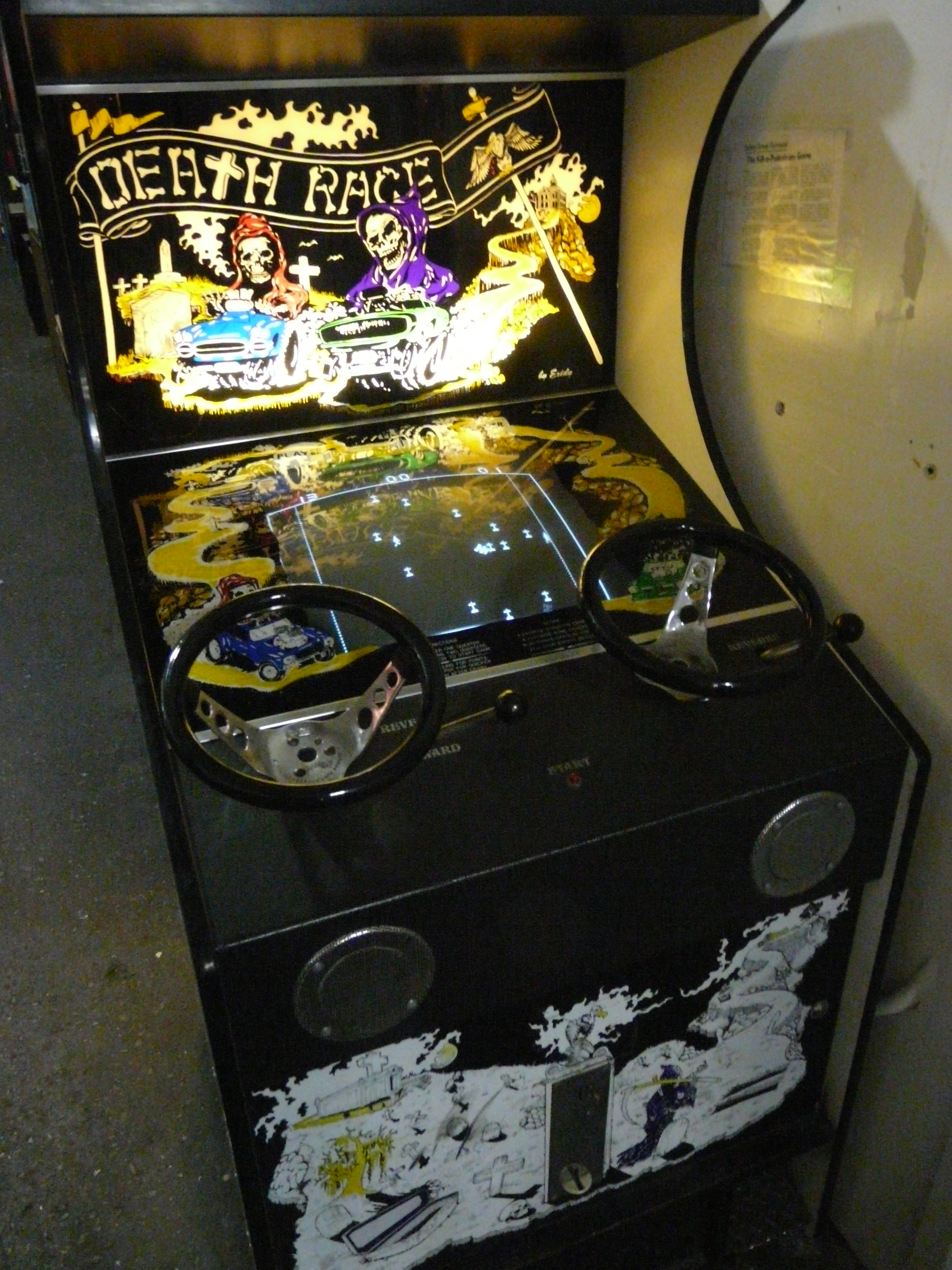
Death Race (1976)

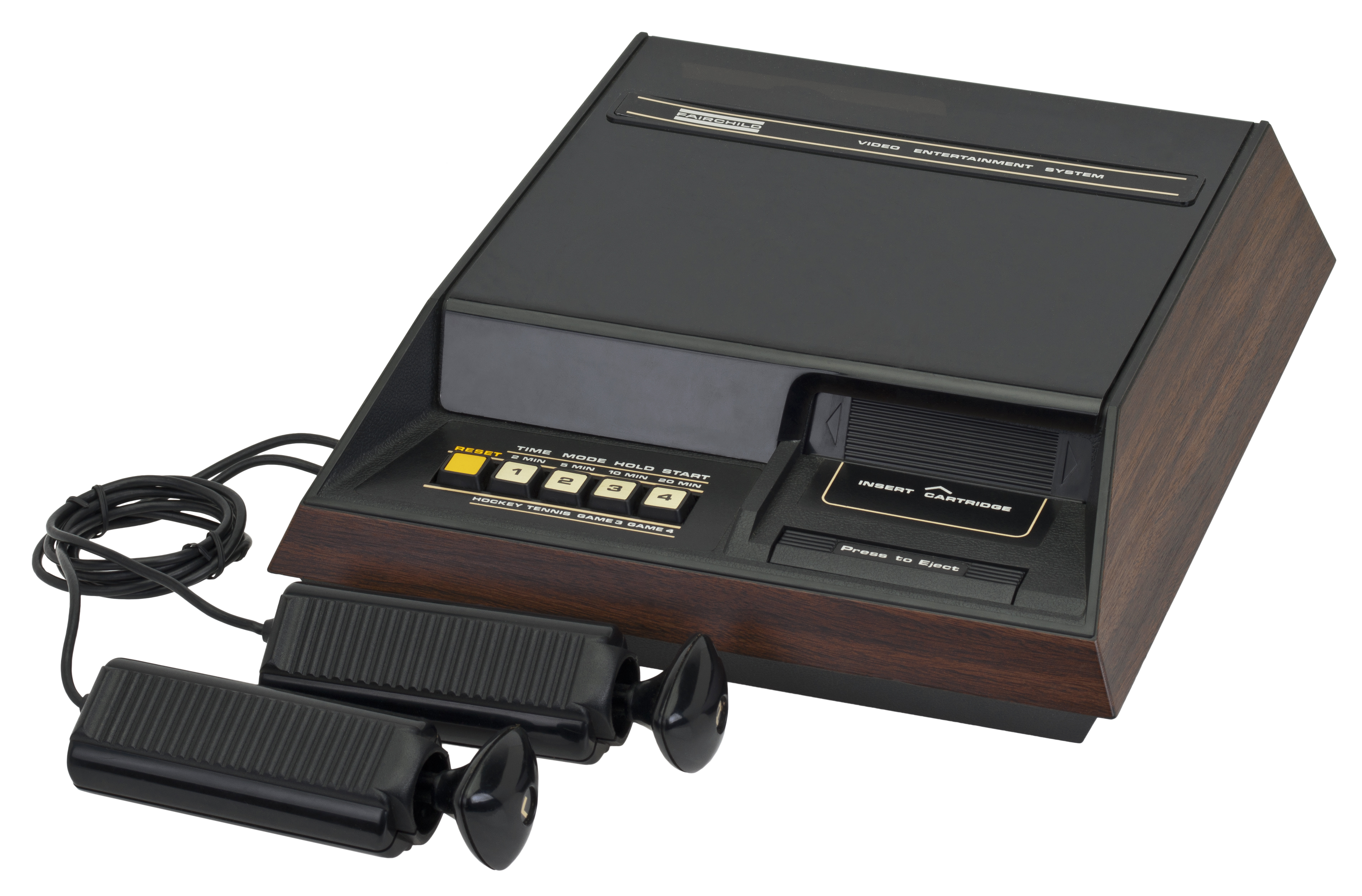
Fairchild Channel F (1976)

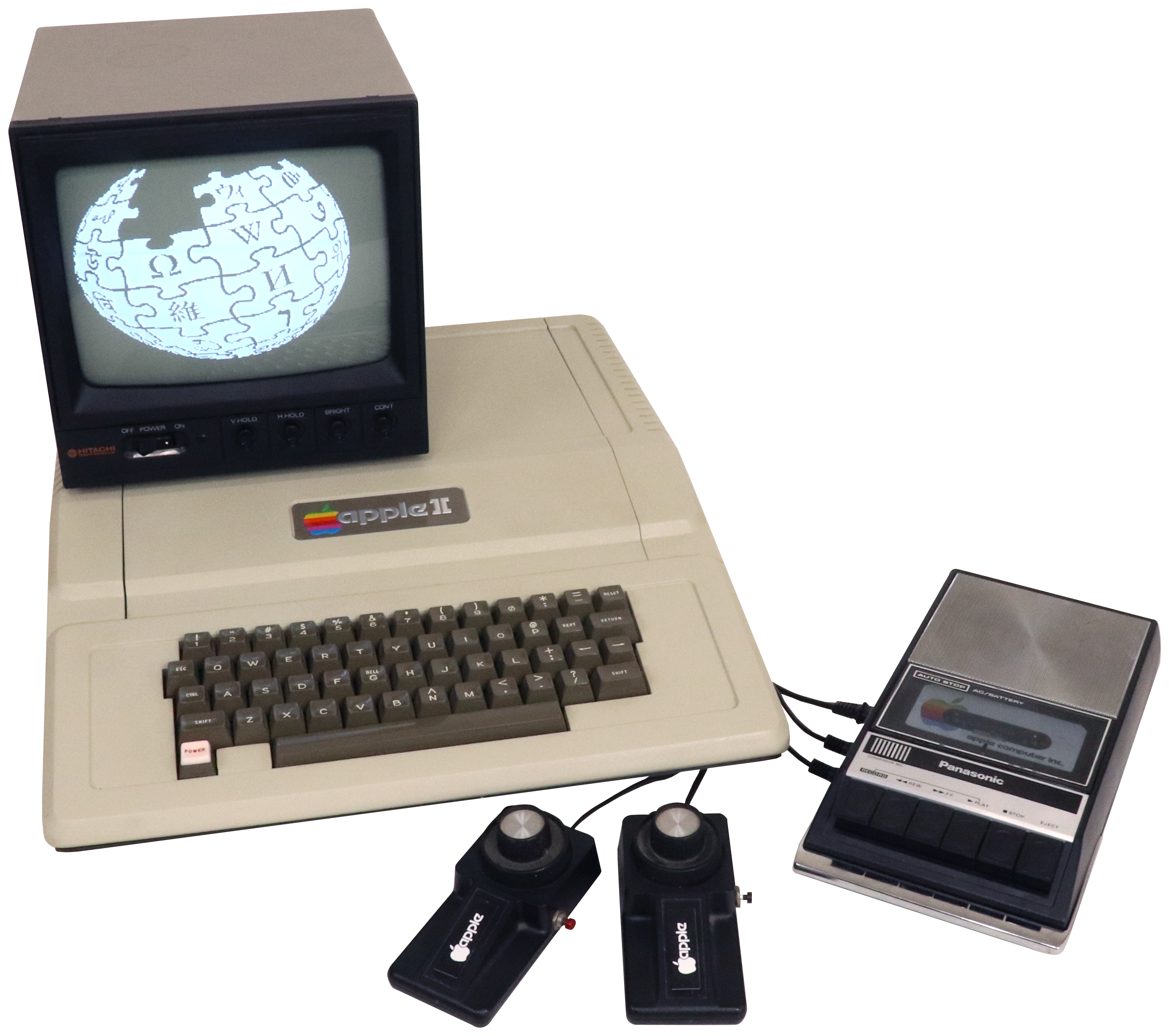
Apple II (1977)

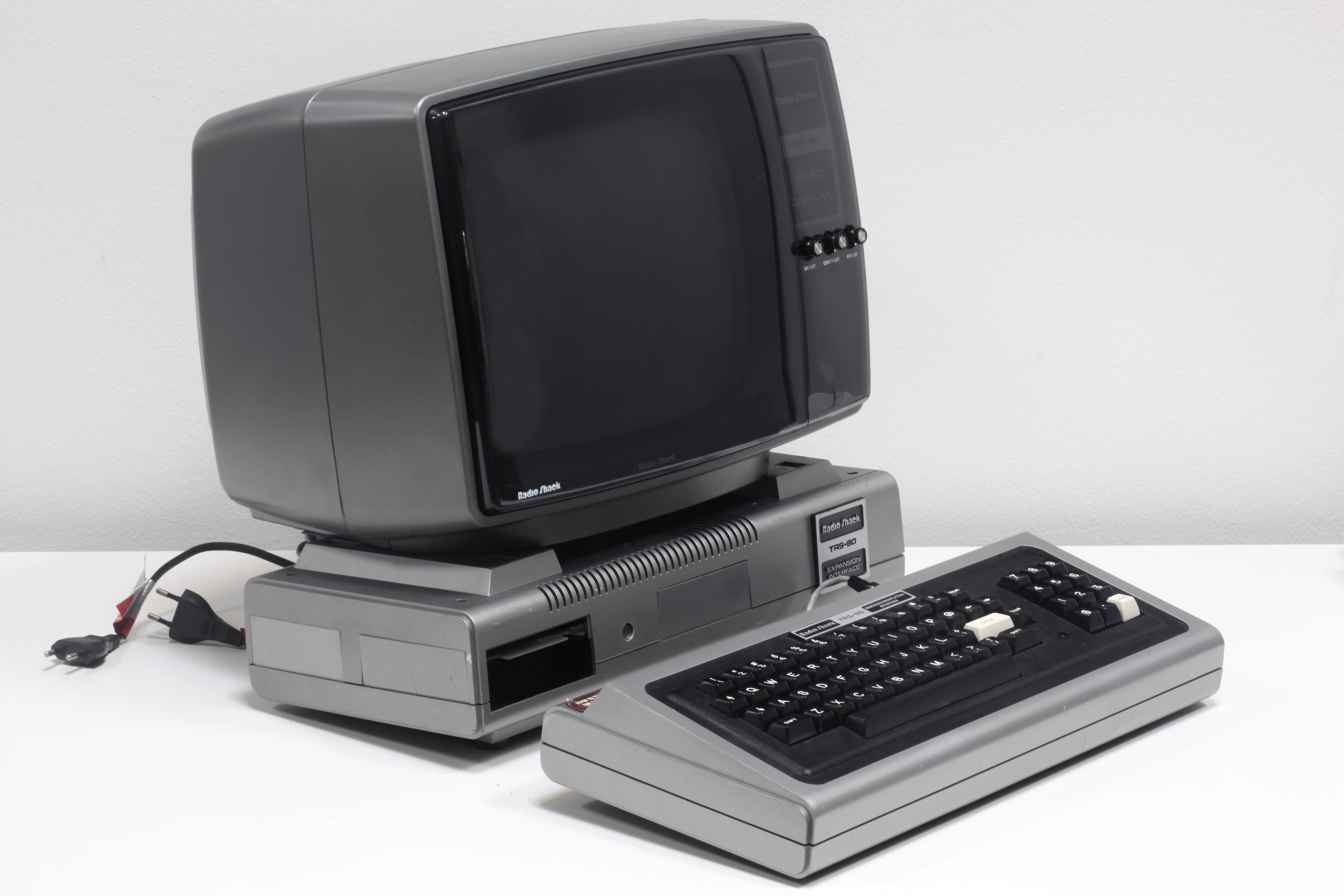
TRS-80 (1977)

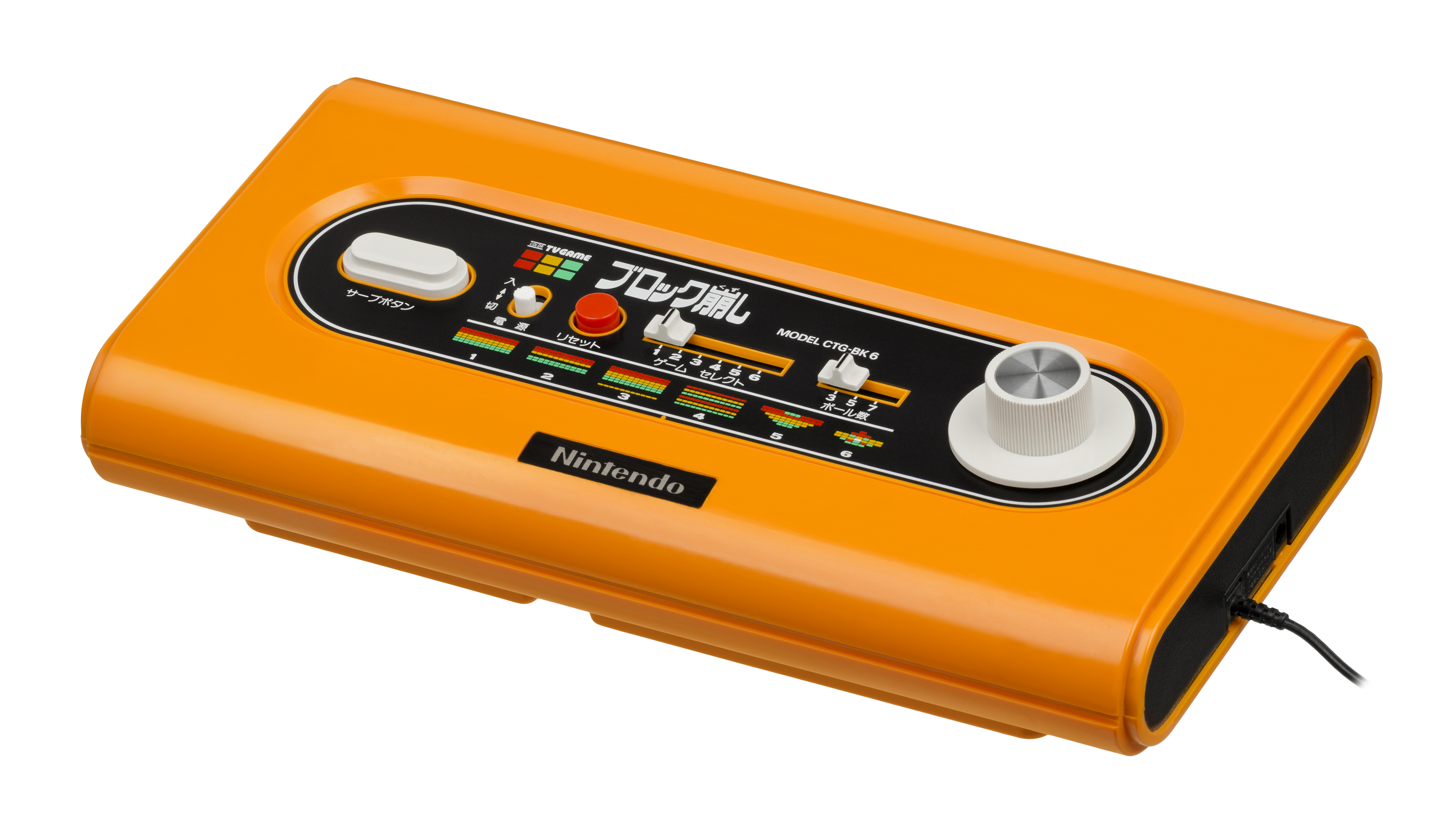
Color TV-Game (1977)

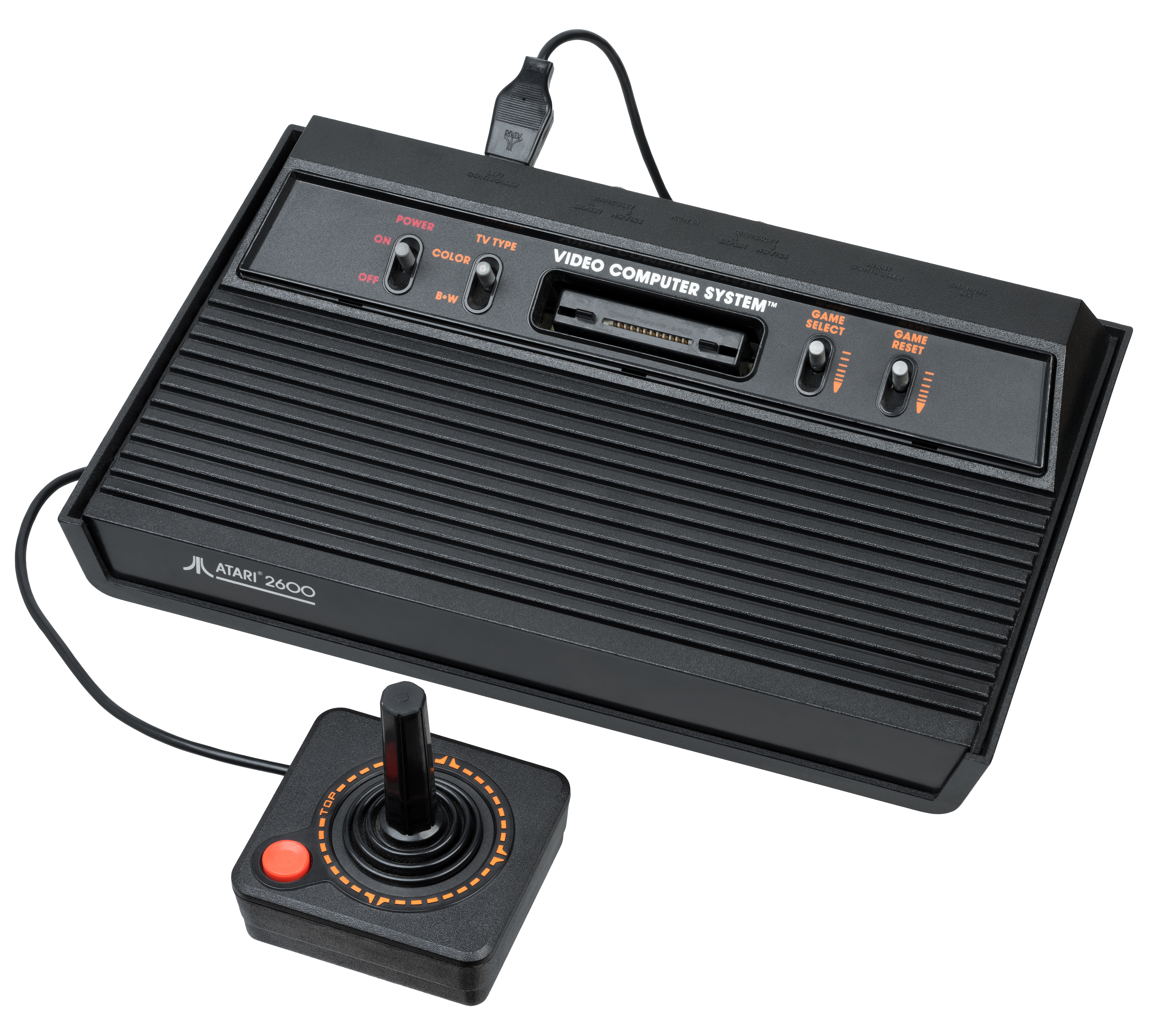
Atari 2600 (1977)

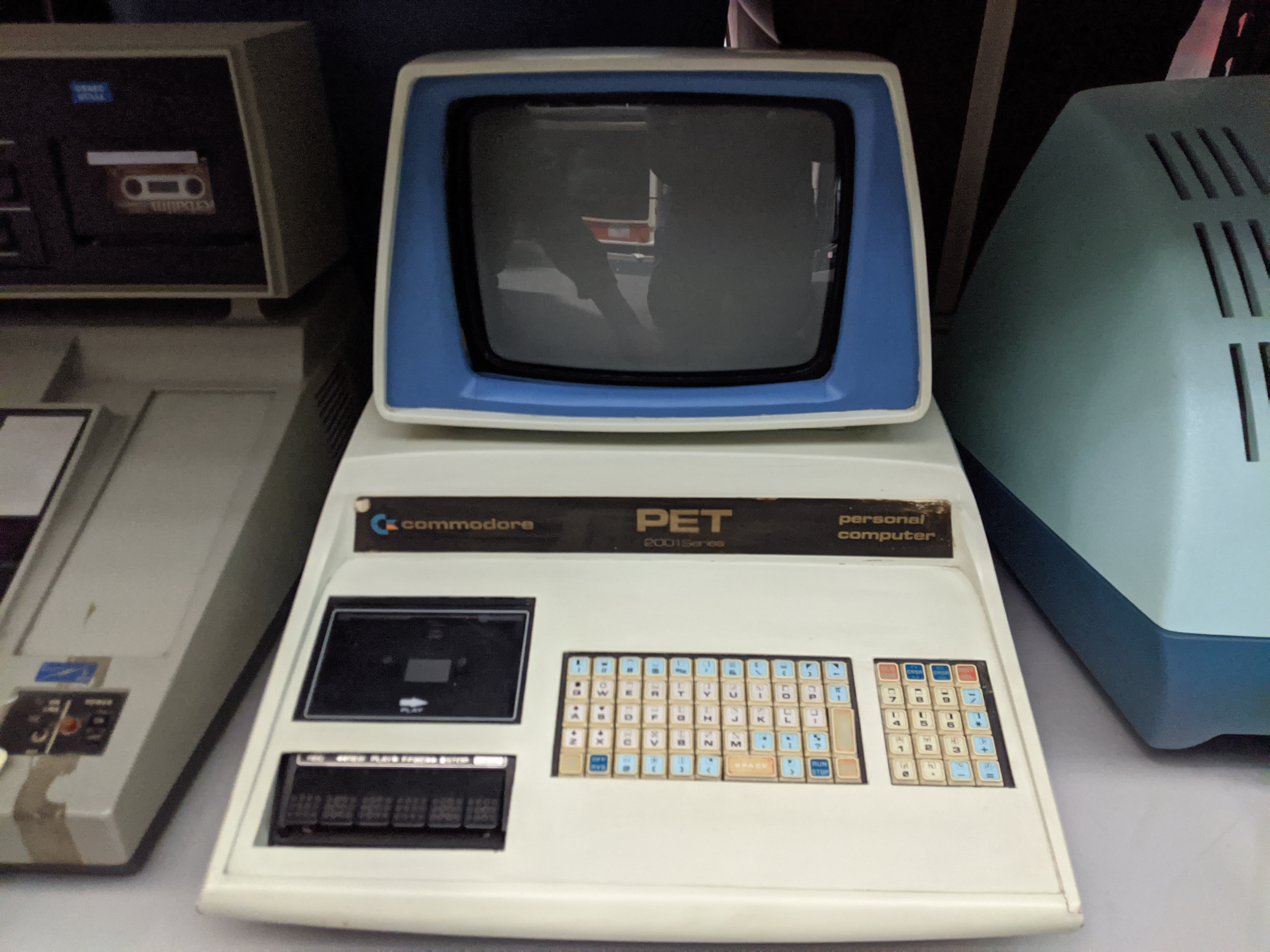
Commodore PET (1977)

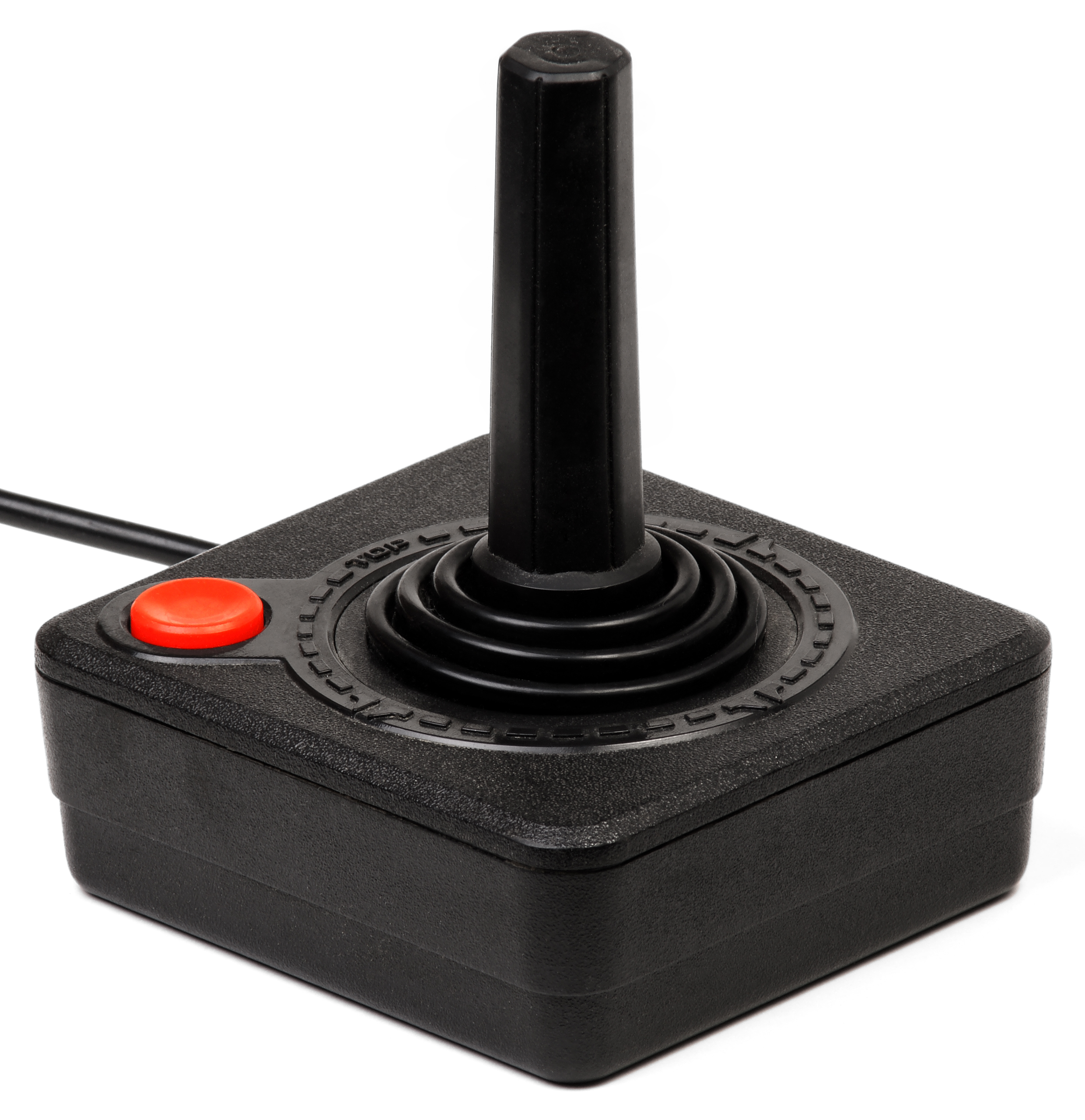
Atari CX40 joystick (1978)

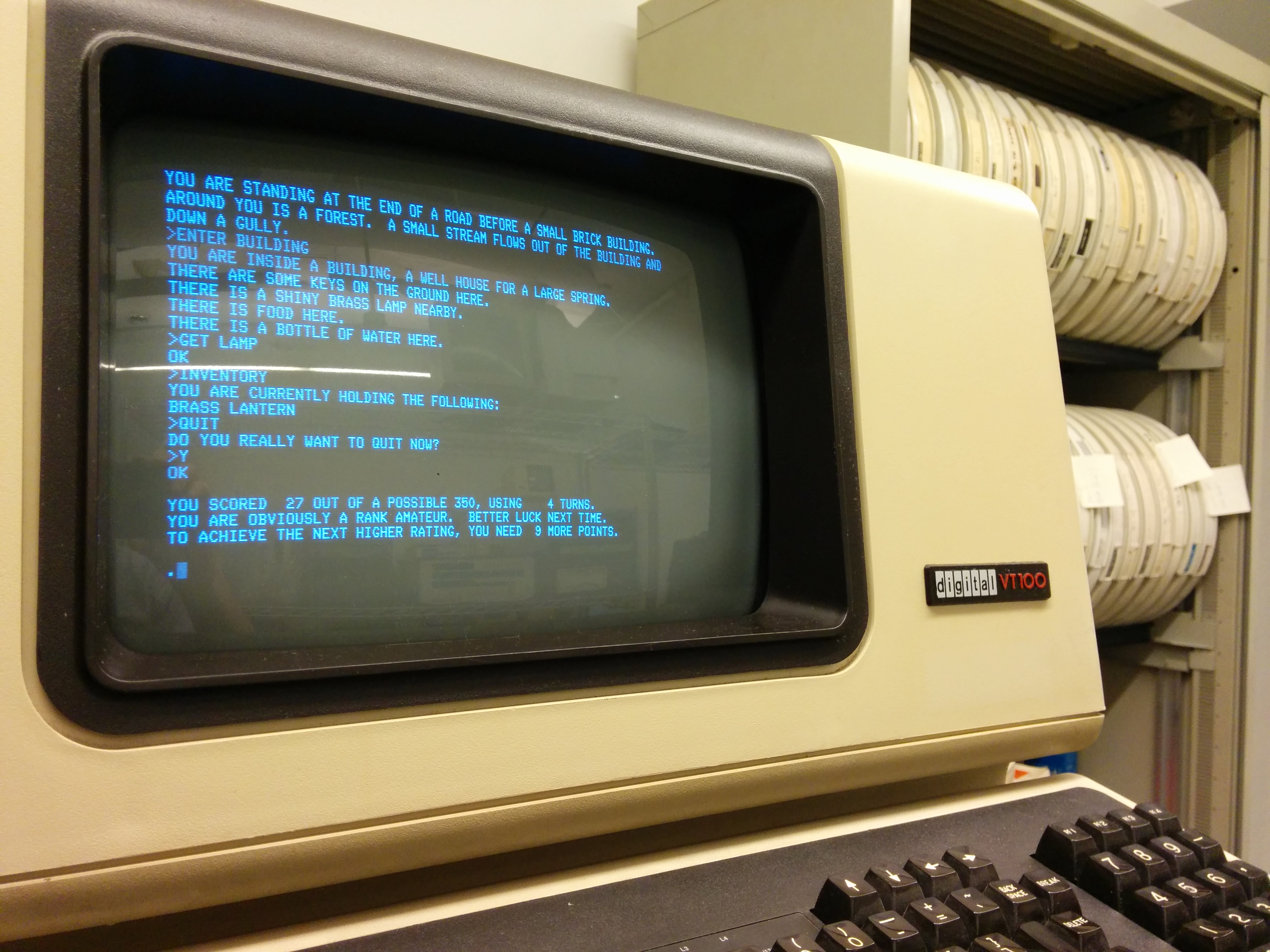
VT100 (1978)

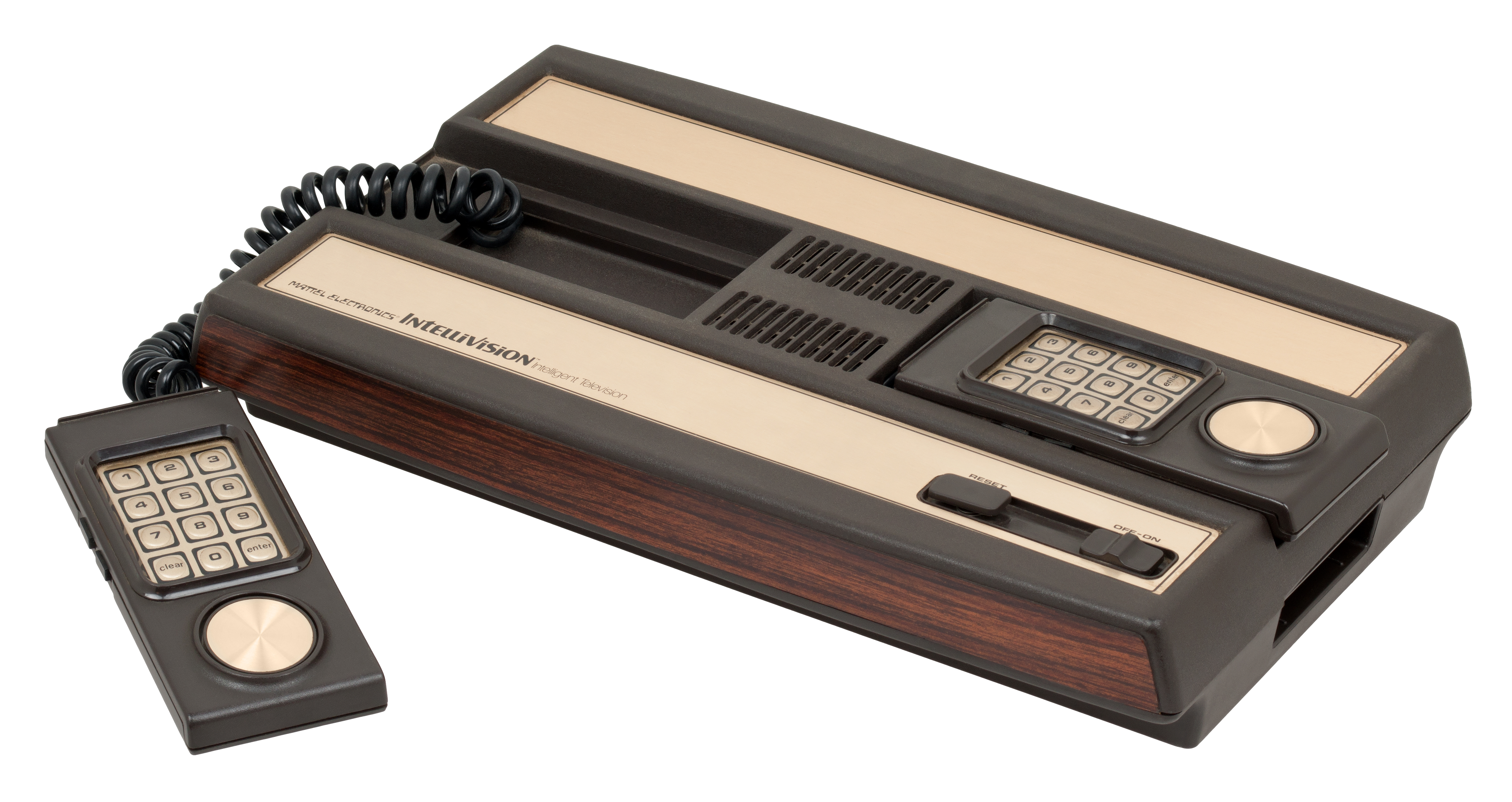
Intellivision (1979)

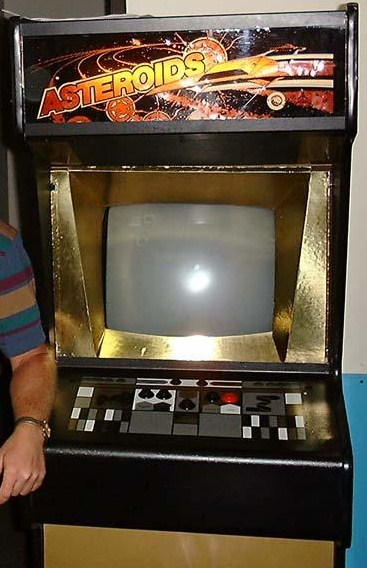
Asteroids (1979)

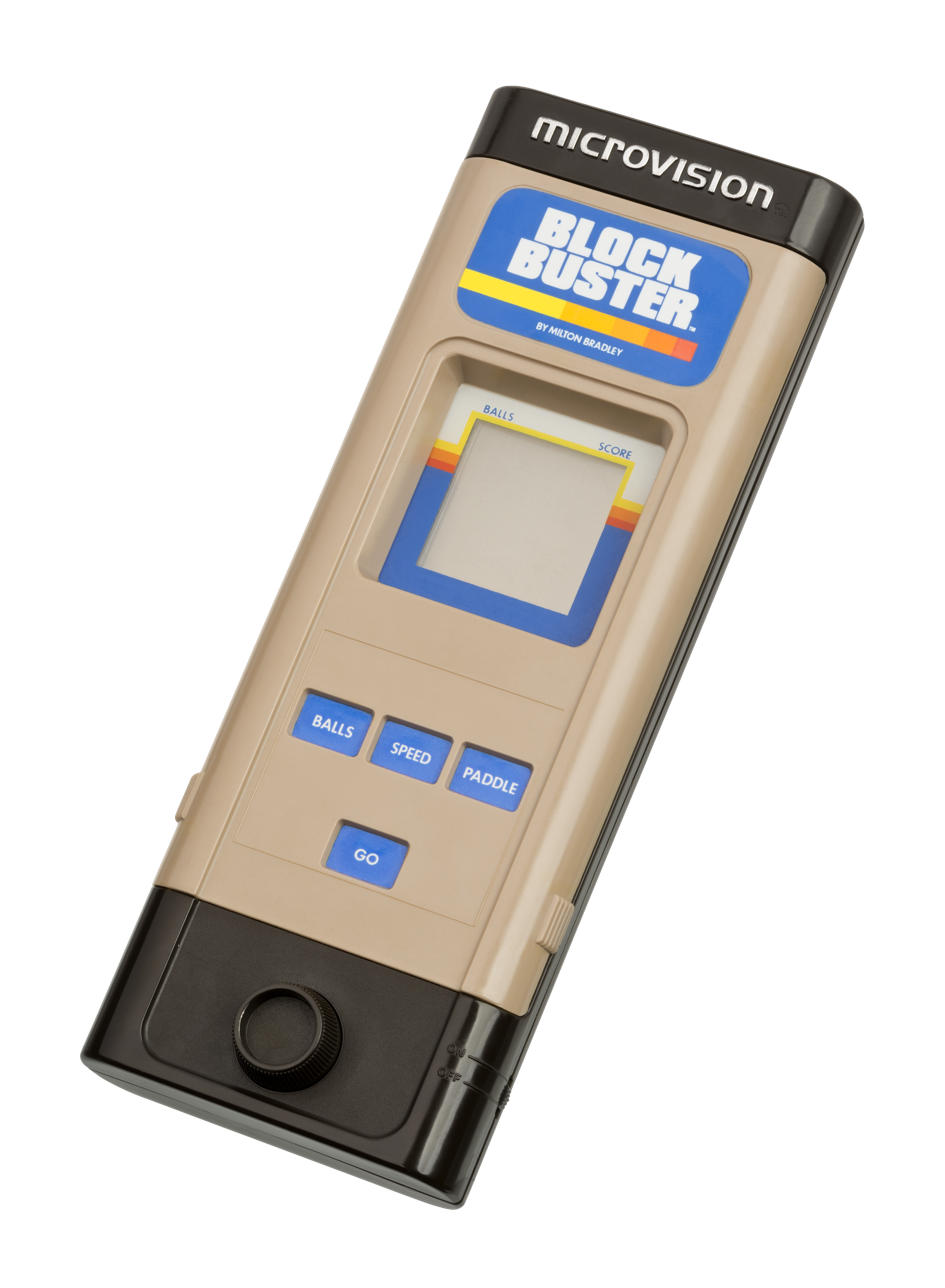
Microvision (1979)

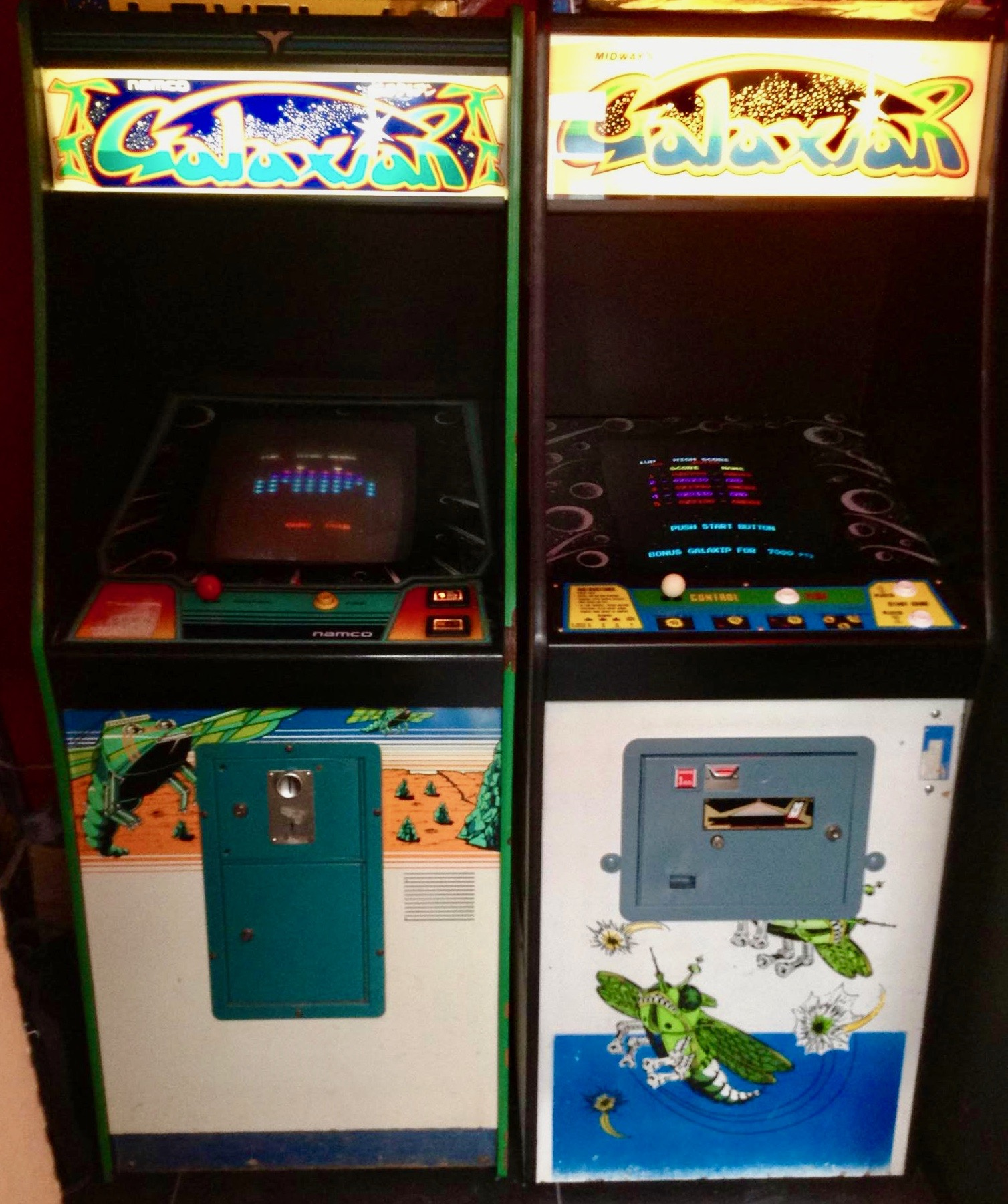
Galaxian (1979)
