= 1970s in science and technology =

- 1960s
- 1970s in science and technology
- 1980s
Other topics in 1970s:
- Anthropology
- Comics
- Fashion
- Motorsport
- Music
- Sociology
- Television
- Video games

This article is a summary of the 1970s in science and technology.

== Science ==
The 1970s in science and technology reached its height with the ambitious Voyager Program, which sent the Voyager 1 and Voyager 2 uncrewed expeditions to several of the outer planets in the Solar System. The program also included a Voyager Golden Record with the spaceships in hopes of presenting aspects of life on Earth to intelligent alien life forms. The record contained pictures and other data about human beings and other living beings on earth. It also had an assortment of music from across cultures.

Coupled with the zenithal achievements of the Voyagers was the end of NASA's Apollo lunar spacecraft program, with the final flight, Apollo 17, in 1972. The Apollo–Soyuz and Spacelab programs ended in 1976, and there would be a five-year hiatus in American crewed spaceflight until the flight of the Space Shuttle. The Soviet Union developed vital technologies involving long-term human life in free-fall on the Salyut and later Mir space stations.

The 1970s witnessed an explosion in the understanding of solid-state physics, driven by the development of the integrated circuit and the laser. The evolution of the computer produced an interesting duality in the physical sciences at this period — analogue recording technology had reached its peak and was incredibly sophisticated. However, digital measurement and mathematical tools, now becoming cheaper (though still out of reach for the general public) allowed discrete answers and imaging of physical phenomena, albeit at a low resolution and a low bandwidth of data.

Deep understanding of physics became important in the 1970s. At CERN, the Irs proton collider and the Super Proton Synchrotron started operation in this decade, and Stephen Hawking developed his theories of black holes and the boundary-condition of the universe.

The biological sciences, spurred by social concerns about the environment and life, gained tremendous detail. The elucidation of molecular biology, bacteriology, virology and genetics achieved their modern forms in this decade. Discrete quantum interactions within living systems became amenable to analysis and manipulation. Genetic engineering became a commercially viable technology.

The changes and attitude of social concern regarding science in the 1970s was addressed by Warren Weaver, who said that "Scientific theories cannot be rigidly deterministic."

== Technology ==
The birth of modern computing was in the 1970s. The world's first general microprocessor, the Intel 4004, came out in November 1971. The C programming language was developed early in the decade and the Unix operating system was rewritten into it in 1973. With "large-scale integration" possible for integrated circuits (microchips) rudimentary personal computers began to be produced along with pocket calculators. Notable home computers released in North America of the era are the Apple II, the TRS-80, the Commodore PET, and Atari 400/800 and the NEC PC-8001 in Japan.

The availability of affordable personal computers led to the first popular wave of internetworking with the first bulletin board systems. In 1976, Cray Research, Inc. introduced the first supercomputer, the Cray-1, which could perform 230,000,000 calculations per second. Supercomputers designed by Cray continued to dominate the market throughout the 1970s. The 1970s was also the beginning of the video game era. Atari established itself as the dominant force in home video gaming, first with its home version of the arcade game Pong and later in the decade with the Atari 2600 console (originally called the "VCS", or Video Computer System). By 1979, the scene was set for the Golden Age of Arcade Games.

The 1970s were also the start of fiber optics. In 1970 Corning Glass announced that it had created a glass fiber so clear that it could be used to communicate pulses of light. Soon after GTE and AT&T began experiments to transmit sound and image data using fiber optics, and transformed the communications industry. After 1973 both the United States and Europe turned away from the large and heavy mainstream automobiles, and towards lightweight, fuel-efficient and environmentally-conscious vehicles, already beginning to be produced by Japan. The Lotus Esprit was an example of a 1970s super car, producing high performance from a small engine. The Volkswagen Golf GTI of 1974 made the concept of a performance hatchback part of automotive mainstream thinking, though it had many precedents.

The United States lagged badly in the development of compact and fuel-efficient vehicles, a side effect of industrial inexperience on the part of the manufacturers in Detroit. Two giants of the industry, GM and Ford both produced vehicles that fell drastically short of customer desires and economic demands; in the case of GM the Vega and for Ford the Pinto. Automotive historians have also described the period as 'the era of poor quality control', and manufacturers internationally produced vehicles that have since become by-words for poor technological integration.

Notably, the 1970s saw the introduction in the automotive field of novel technologies, particularly from Japan and Germany, that would begin to mature in the 1990s and 2000s as viable alternative propulsion sources, such as hybrid vehicles, Stirling engines, as well as solar-electric and pure-electric vehicles.

The integration of the computer and robot, particularly in Japan, saw unprecedented improvements in mass-produced automotive quality. Japanese advanced lightweight, fuel efficient and environmentally-conscious vehicles dramatically increased in demand, and such cars as the Honda Civic and the Toyota Corolla became some of the most popular and iconic vehicles of the 1970s. Japanese manufacturers dramatically made their presence felt in international markets during the decade.

During the 1970s, microwave ovens experienced a surge in popularity as price and size decreased rapidly towards the end of the decade. Cassette tapes continued to surge in popularity after their introduction in the 1960s. JVC's VHS and Sony's Betamax waged a videotape format war as the primary recording and video devices beginning in 1976, but by the end of the decade VHS had become the dominant format. Also introduced to the home market was the Laserdisc, the first optical disc format used primarily for high quality video.

== See also ==
- 1970 in science
- 1971 in science
- 1972 in science
- 1973 in science
- 1974 in science
- 1975 in science
- 1976 in science
- 1977 in science
- 1978 in science
- 1979 in science
- Timeline of computing 1950–1979
- History of science and technology
- List of science and technology articles by continent
- List of years in science
