= 1980s in anthropology =

- 1970s
- 1980s in anthropology
- 1990s
Other topics in 1980s:
- Comics
- Fashion
- Motorsport
- Music
- Science and technology
- Sociology
- Television
- Video games

Timeline of anthropology, 1980–1989

== Events ==
1984

- "Turkana Boy" is discovered

1986

- The Human Genome Project is launched

1989

- The National Museum of the American Indian is founded in the U.S.

== Publications ==
1980

- Negara: The Theatre State in Nineteenth-Century Bali, by Clifford Geertz
- The Devil and Commodity Fetishism in South America, by Michael Taussig

1981

- In Vain I Tried To Tell You: Essays in Native American Ethnopoetics, by Dell Hymes
- Nisa: The Life and Words of a Kung Woman, by Marjorie Shostak

1982

- Europe and the People Without History by Eric Wolf

1983

- Local Knowledge: further essays in interpretive anthropology by Clifford Geertz

1984

- Muelos: A Stone Age Superstition about Sexuality, by Weston La Barre

1985

- Sweetness And Power : The Place Of Sugar In Modern History, by Sidney Mintz

1986

- Writing Culture, ed. by James Clifford and George E. Marcus

1988

- Donald Brown's Hierarchy, History, and Human Nature was published.

1989

- Our Kind: Who We Are, Where We Came From, Where We Are Going, by Marvin Harris

== Deaths ==
1980

- Gregory Bateson
- Johanes Nicolaisen

1981

- Carleton Coon
- Marvin Opler

1983

- Meyer Fortes
- Herge Kleivan
- Carobeth Laird
- Victor Turner

1984

- Michel Foucault
- Audrey Richards

1985

- Karl-Gustav Izikowitz
- George Peter Murdock
- Barbara Myerhoff

1986

- Morton Fried
- Elman Service

1989

- Edmund Leach

== Awards ==
1980

- Margaret Mead Award: Brigitte Jordan

1981

- Margaret Mead Award: Nancy Scheper-Hughes

1984

- Margaret Mead Award: Sue E. Erstoff

1985

- Margaret Mead Award: Susan C.M. Scrimshaw

1986

- Margaret Mead Award: Jill Korbin

1989

- Margaret Mead Award: Mark Nichter
