= John Rex =

British academic

- Born: 5 March 1925; Port Elizabeth, South Africa
- Died: 18 December 2011 (aged 86)
- Occupation: Academic sociologist

John Rex (5 March 1925 – 18 December 2011) was a South African-born British sociologist. Born in Port Elizabeth, he was radicalised after working for the South African Bantu Affairs Administration and moved to Britain. He was a lecturer at the universities of Leeds (1949–62) (where he was a leading left-wing activist), Birmingham (1962–64), Durham (1964–70), Warwick (1970–79 and 1984–90), Aston (1979–84), Toronto (1974–75), Cape Town (1991) and New York (1996). He was also a member of the UNESCO International Experts' Committee on Racism and Race Prejudice (1967) and president of the International Sociological Association's Research Committee on Racial and Ethnic Minorities (1974–82).

== Academic work ==
His academic work involved the analysis of conflict as a key problem of both society and sociological theory. His 1961 book, Key Problems of Sociological Theory, was his first major work where conflict was claimed to be more realistic than the past British functionalist theories of social order and system-stability. He is also known for his studies of race and ethnic relations. He analyzed the classic tradition of sociology, including Karl Marx, Max Weber, Georg Simmel and Émile Durkheim in his book Discovering Sociology (1973).

Rex worked "at the universities of Leeds (1949-62); Birmingham (1962-64); Durham (1964-70); Warwick (1970-79 and 1984-90); Aston (1979-84); Toronto (1974-75); Cape Town (1991); and New York (1996)." He was a professor emeritus at Warwick University. His life has been described by Herminio Martins of Oxford University as one where both "passion" and "knowledge" intertwined. Theory and practice was for him always a dynamic issue and led to his demands for "objective" research and comment while being a political radical involved in the UK's Campaign for Nuclear Disarmament (CND) and the New Left Review.

== Publications ==
=== Books ===
His book publications include:

- Rex, John (1961). Key Problems of Sociological Theory. Routledge & K. Paul. ISBN 978-0-7100-6903-0. (reprint Taylor & Francis, 1970, ISBN 978-0-7100-6903-0)
- Race, Community and Conflict: a study of Sparkbrook, with R.S.Moore, OUP 1967
- Discovering Sociology, 1973
- Race, Colonialism and the City, 1973
- John Rex, ed. (1974). Approaches to Sociology. Routledge. ISBN 978-0-7100-7825-4. "John Rex."
- Rex, John (1974). Sociology and the Demystification of the Modern World. Taylor & Francis. ISBN 978-0-7100-7858-2.
- John Rex; Sally Tomlinson (1979). Colonial immigrants in a British city: a class analysis. Routledge. ISBN 978-0-7100-0142-9.
- Apartheid and Social Research, ed., Paris: UNESCO 1981
- Social Conflict - A Theoretical and Conceptual Analysis, 1981
- The Ghetto and the Underclass, Aldershot, 1987
- Ethnic Minorities and the Modern Nation State London 1996

=== Articles ===
His articles include:

- "Ethnic and Race Issues", 1996 (in: Youth and Social Work on the Move, ed. by Amesberger, Schörghuber and Krehan, in: European Union Congress Report, published by the Institute of Sports Sciences of the University of Vienna, Austria.

=== On John Rex ===
- Martins, Herminio, ed. (1993). Knowledge and Passion: Essays in Honour of John Rex. I.B.Tauris. ISBN 978-1-85043-323-1.
- Abbas, Tahir and Frank Reeves, Immigration and Race Relations: Sociological Theory and John Rex, 2007
