= Thomas R. Dye =

American political scientist (1935–2025)

Thomas R. Dye (December 16, 1935 – June 22, 2025) was an American political scientist, Professor of Political Science at Florida State University and a McKenzie Professor of Government. Dye described politics as being about who gets scarce governmental resources, where, when, why and how.

== Academic background and preparation ==
Dye graduated from Pennsylvania State University where he received his B.S. and M.A. degrees; Dye received his Ph.D. from the University of Pennsylvania.

Dye had taught at the University of Pennsylvania, the University of Wisconsin, and the University of Georgia, among other institutions. He was a visiting scholar at Bar-Ilan University in Israel, and at the Brookings Institution in Washington D.C.

Dye had served as president of the Southern Political Science Association, the Policy Studies Organization, and had served as the secretary of the American Political Science Association. Dye also served as past president of the Lincoln Center for Public Service.

Dye died on June 22, 2025, at the age of 89.

== Areas of interest ==
Dye's main research interests centered on the conflict between the two political organizational theories of Elite theory vs. Pluralism in American politics. His two best known works The Irony of Democracy (now in its 17th edition) and Who's Running America? (now in its 8th edition, The Obama Reign) discuss this on-going conflict in great detail.

Dye had also researched and published on the role of major campaign contributors, foundations and think tanks, interest groups, and the media in policy formation in Washington, D.C.

== Major publications ==
- Politics in States and Communities (now in 15th edition)
- Politics in America (Political Science text book now in 8th edition)
- Understanding Public Policy (now in 15th edition)
- Who's Running America? (now in 8th edition)
- Top Down Policymaking
- Power and Society
- The Irony of Democracy (now in 17th edition)
- Politics in Florida
- American Politics in the Media Age
- American Federalism
- Policy Analysis: What Governments Do, Why They Do it and What Difference it Makes

== Honors and awards ==
- Harold Lasswell Award for career contributions to the study of public policy
- Donald C. Stone Award for career contributions to the study of federalism
- Outstanding Political Science Alumni Award from the Penn State Department of Political Science

== See also ==
- Elite theory
- Oligarchy
- List of political authors
- List of political scientists
