= Political Process and the Development of the Black Insurgency, 1930–1970 =

1982 book by Doug McAdam

- Author: Doug McAdam
- Language: English
- Subject: Sociology
- Publisher: University of Chicago Press
- Publication date: 1982
- Pages: 304
- ISBN: 978-0-226-55551-5
- Dewey Decimal: 305.8/96073
- LC Class: E185.61 .M475

Political Process and the Development of the Black Insurgency, 1930–1970 is a 1982 book by the sociologist Doug McAdam (published by the University of Chicago Press). The book details the rise and fall of the American Civil Rights Movement by looking at it through the paradigm of the opportunities available via the established political structure, and more specifically the opportunity for social movement groups to make successful claims of grievances.
