= John Westergaard =

- Born: July 2, 1931; Brooklyn, New York, United States
- Died: January 31, 2003 (aged 71)
- Education: Williams College in Massachusetts
- Occupations: Stock analyst, Fund manager and political advisor
- Spouse: Louise Arnold (m. June 1964 in New York)
- Children: 4

John Westergaard (2 July 1931 – 31 January 2003) was an American stock analyst and founder of the Westergaard Fund. He was also as political advisor to Senator Daniel Patrick Moynihan.

== Background ==
Westergaard was born Johannes Westergaard July 2, 1931 in Brooklyn, New York. He was raised on Long Island and graduated from Willams College in Massachusetts. He became interested in the Democratic Party politics while studying at Williams College in the early 1950s.

== Career ==
John Westergaard began his Wall Street career as an analyst for Standard & Poor's, the securities rating service. In 1960 he opened a research firm with his friend, William Prime. Their company, Equity Research Associates, offered analytical services to small brokerage firms that could not afford research departments. This business was later acquired by Ladenburg, Thalmann & Company, a brokerage firm.

In the 1980s, Westergaard founded the Westergaard Fund, a mutual fund that focused on finding emerging companies. However, the firm was not as successful as stocks of small companies generally lagged the market during the bull market of the early and mid-1980s. Westergaard funds closed during November 1987.

Westergaard continued to publish research via a mailed - and later faxed - newsletter available to subscribers. Westergaard eventually moved his publishing to the Internet, starting a website devoted to small company stocks. He was the host of an investment radio show, Johnny Dotcom's Journal, where he interviewed executives of start up companies, and offered a service to companies in which he tried to monitor electronic rumor mongers and to counteract the stories they spread.

Westergaard also served as treasurer for Daniel Patrick Moynihan from the earliest days of his political career through four Senate campaigns. Westergaard agreed to serve as Moynihan's campaign treasurer when he ran for New York City Council president. Moynihan lost that race but the two men remained friends, and in 1976 Westergaard became treasurer of Moynihan's first successful Senate race.

== Securities & Exchange Commission Lawsuits ==
In 2000 Westergaard was sued by the SEC for securities fraud which they specified as "broadly disseminating on the Internet and through press releases purportedly 'independent' analysis of publicly-traded securities when in fact defendant had been paid ($48,000 by the company) to publish that analysis.". Suit was filed in Southern District Court of New York case #1:00-cv-09776-DAB.

== Personal life ==
Westergaard married Louise Arnold June 1964 in New York. Louise was a theatrical producer on Broadway. Together they had four children.
