= Doug McAdam =

American sociologist (born 1951)

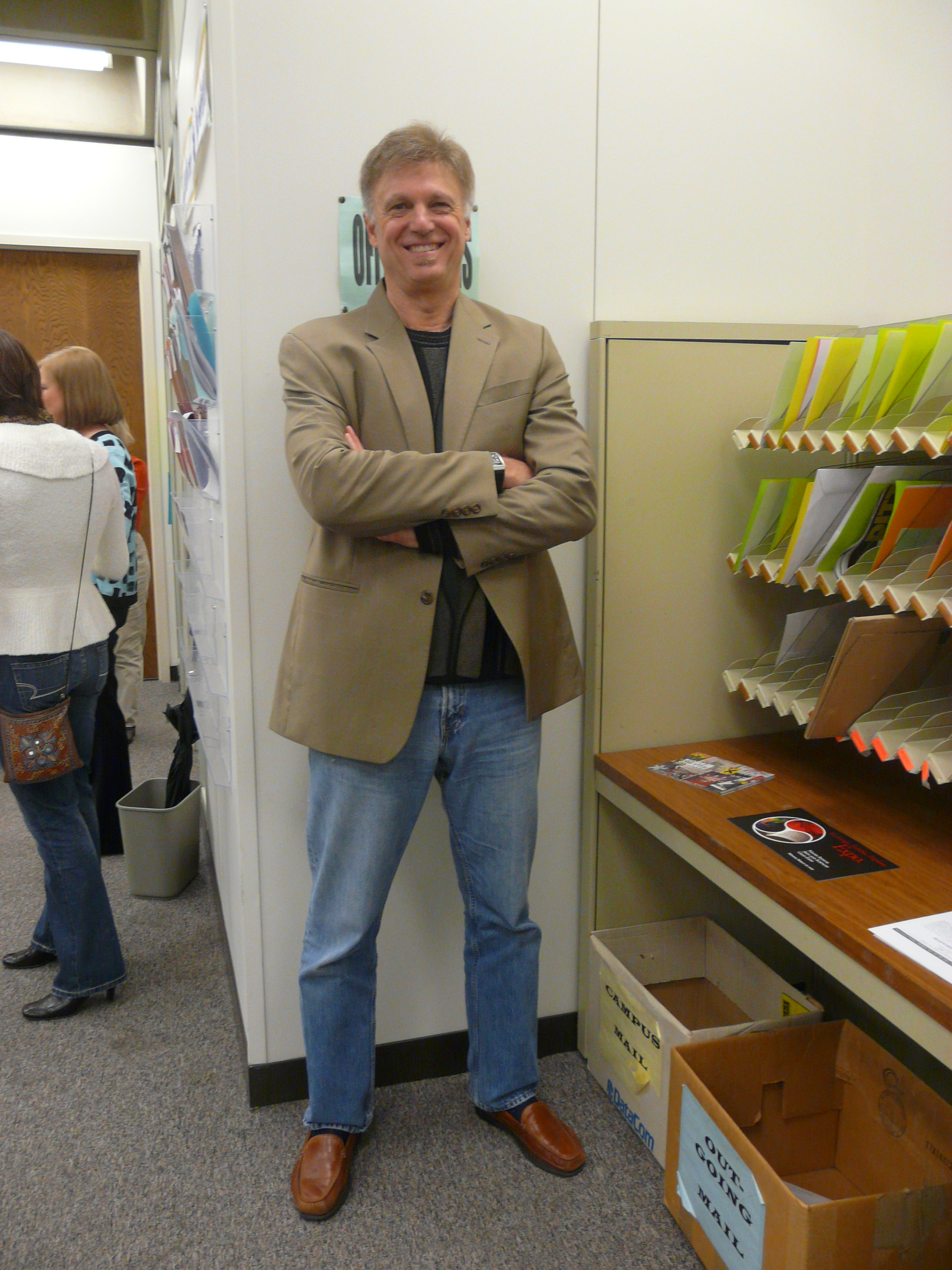
Doug McAdam

Doug McAdam (born August 31, 1951) is Professor of Sociology at Stanford University. He did early work on the political process model in social movement analysis. He wrote a book on the theory in 1982 when analyzing the U.S. Civil Rights Movement: Political Process and the Development of the Black Insurgency 1930-1970. His other book Freedom Summer won the C. Wright Mills Award in 1990. He was the director of the Center for Advanced Study in the Behavioral Sciences between 2001 and 2005. He was elected to the American Academy of Arts and Sciences in 2003.

== Works ==
- McAdam, D. & Karina Kloos. 2014. Deeply Divided: Racial Politics and Social Movements in Postwar America. New York: Oxford University Press.
- McAdam, D. & Fligstein, N. (2012). A Theory of Fields
- Gerald Davis, Doug McAdam, W. Richard Scott, and Mayer N. Zald (eds.), 2005. Social Movements and Organizations, New York: Cambridge University Press.
- Mario Diani and Doug McAdam (eds.), 2003. Social Movements and Networks: Relational Approaches to Collective Action, Oxford: Oxford University Press.
- Dynamics of Contention. 2001. Cambridge University Press (with Sidney Tarrow and Charles Tilly).
- Political Process and the Development of Black Insurgency, 1930-1970, (2nd Edition), 1999. University of Chicago Press. ISBN 978-0-226-55553-9
- Freedom Summer, 1988, Oxford University Press.
- McAdam, D. (1982). Political Process and the Development of Black Insurgency, 1930–1970. 346p.
