= Raymond Boudon =

French sociologist and philosopher (1934–2013)

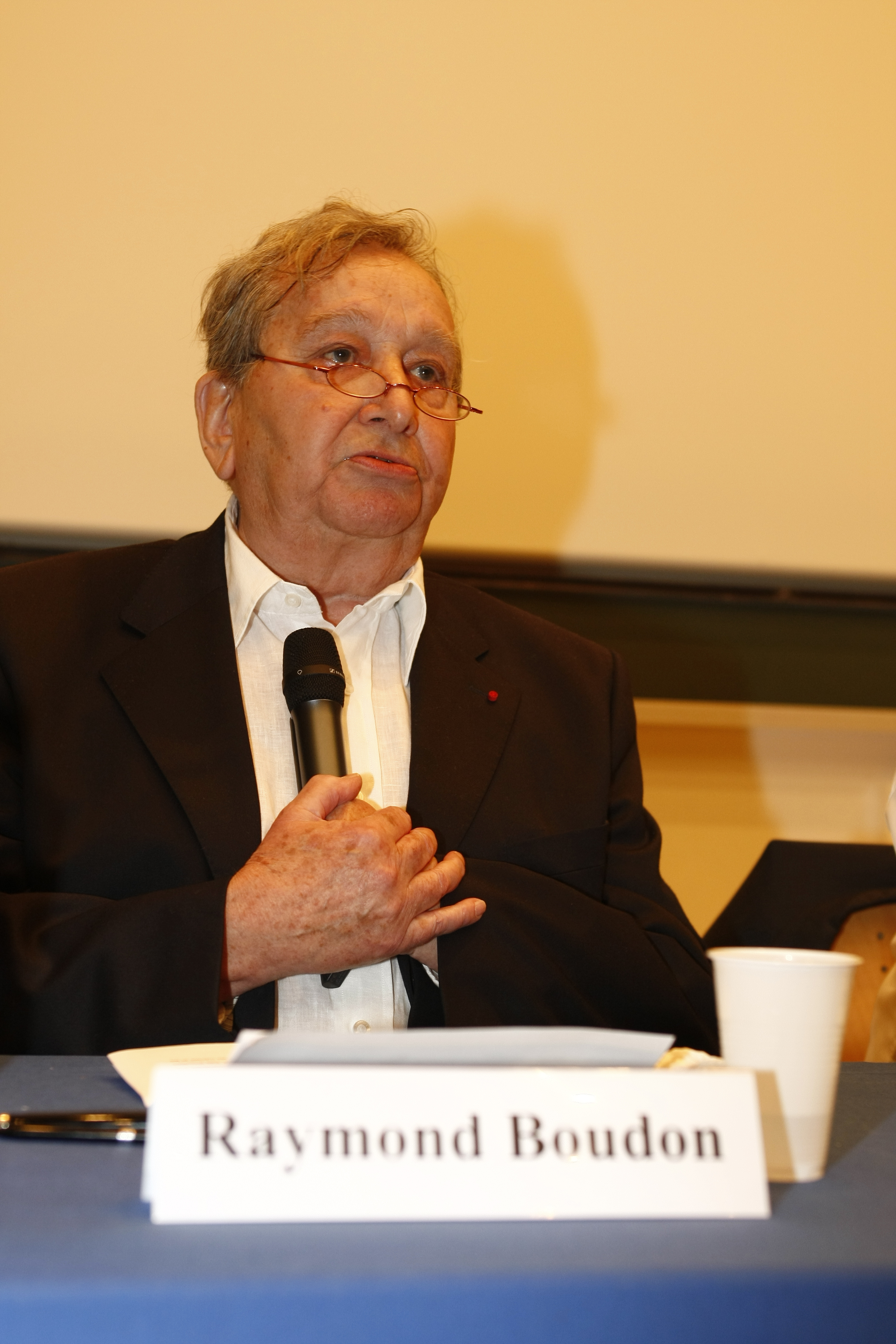
- Born: 27 January 1934; Paris, France
- Died: 10 April 2013 (aged 79); Paris, France

Raymond Boudon (27 January 1934 – 10 April 2013) was a sociologist, philosopher and Professor in the Paris-Sorbonne University.

== Career ==
With Alain Touraine, Michel Crozier and Pierre Bourdieu, Raymond Boudon is one of the leading French sociologists of the last quarter of the 20th century. He is known for his research on social mobility and inequality of opportunities as well as for his defense of methodological individualism. He edited the journal Quality and Quantity.

He was a member of many important institutions. Académie des Sciences morales et politiques, Academia Europaea, British Academy, American Academy of Arts and Sciences, International Academy of Human Sciences of St Petersburg, Central European Academy of Arts and Sciences. And a fellow at the Center for Advanced Study in the Behavioral Sciences and an invited professor notably at Harvard, Oxford University, and the Universities of Geneva, Chicago, and Stockholm.

A biographical study of him by Jean-Michel Morin was published in 2006.

A major four-volume Festschrift, 'Raymond Boudon: A Life in Sociology', containing 83 essays, edited by Cherkaoui and Hamilton, was published in 2009.

An 'intellectual autobiography', Sociology as Science. Raymond Boudon (author) , Peter Hamilton (translator).was published in 2013.

== Selected publications ==
- The Uses of Structuralism (1971)
- Education, Opportunity and Social Inequality (1974)
- The Logic of Social Action (1981)
- Theories of Social Change (1986)
- The Analysis of Ideology (1989)
- The Art of Self-Persuasion (1994)
- The Origin of Values (2000)

== Bibliography ==
- E. Di Nuoscio, "Le ragioni degli individui. L'individualismo metodologico di Raymond Boudon", Rubbettino, Roma 1996
