= Amos Hawley =

American sociologist

Amos Henry Hawley (December 5, 1910 – August 31, 2009) was an American sociologist. Hawley studied extensively how human populations interacted with their changing environments along with the growth of populations. He focused his studies on the behavior of populations in terms of organization, development, and change over space and time.

== Career ==
He was awarded a Bachelor of Arts in Sociology from the University of Cincinnati in 1936. At the University of Cincinnati Hawley took an Introduction to Sociology under professor James A. Quinn who had been a student at the Chicago School of Sociology taught by Robert E. Park. In his course of study, several books affected how Hawley conceived of human ecology. These works included An Introduction to the Science of Sociology by Robert E. Park and E.W. Burgess (1921), Social Organization by C.H. Cooley (1929), and Mind, Self, and Society by G.H. Mead (1934). Hawley pursued his Ph.D. at the University of Michigan where he was mentored by Roderick D. McKenzie. McKenzie suffered from a degenerative disease and while he slowly succumbed he assigned Hawley to teach a few of his classes. Hawley was appointed as an instructor in the Sociology department after turning in his dissertation and McKenzie's death in 1940. Hawley was a professor and the Chairman of the Department of Sociology at the University of Michigan. While teaching Hawley printed the 1950 book Human Ecology, which had an international effect on the field of sociology. Hawley taught as professor at Michigan from 1941 to 1966, he served as chair of the Sociology department at University of Michigan for ten years (1951–1961).

During World War II, Hawley served as a consultant to the Department of the Army, Department of the Air Force, the Housing and Home Finance Agency, and the Scripps Foundation for Population Research. Hawley was a visiting professor at the University of the Philippines and was a Fulbright Research Scholar at the University of Naples. Utilizing his expertize he worked as a consultant on population policy to the Prime Minister of Thailand and helped the Prime Minister conduct Thailand's national census. After concluding his travels, Hawley returned to the United States to teach at University of North Carolina, Chapel Hill as Sociology Professor (1966–1976). He was Kenan Professor Emeritus in Sociology at the University of North Carolina at Chapel Hill (1971–1976). In 1971, Hawley was the President of the Population Association of America. He was the 69th President of the American Sociological Association in 1978.

== Ideas and influences ==
Amos Hawley was influenced by Roderick D. McKenzie, who was mentored by Robert E. Park and E.W. Burgess of the Chicago School of Sociology. Roderick McKenzie published several works on a number of topics ranging from immigration (Oriental Exclusion, 1927), economics ( L'evolution economique due monde, 1928), and to urbanism ( The Metropolitan Community, 1933). McKenzie influenced Hawley through his idea that it is necessary to understand change through space and time among populations or an aggregate. Hawley learned from Mckenzie that humans are observable units within an ecosystem with a given technology they will interact with their environment and develop predictable patterns.

Hawley expanded McKenzie's work on population studies and human interaction with the environment further. Hawley contended that "the environment, population, and the ecosystem tend to move toward equilibrium" (Human Ecology, p. 10). In his book, Human Ecology, Hawley wrote that humans will modify their behavior patterns to fit with changes in their biophysical environment. Through this adaption human groups can either evolve or expand into complex societies. For systemic change to occur, such as expansion of a population, disequilibrium is required along with multiple challenges to the environment.

Hawley studied rigorously the nature of change and communities and their relation to time and space. Cumulative change is when a series of increments or a single increment within a social system forms a foundation for the next increment. In his study of change, Hawley strove to answer the question "Are there events or circumstances which lead inexorably toward cumulative change?"

Hawley found that change is irreversible because a series of events within a state of time cannot go backward in time. Evolution, as viewed by those in the scientific community was an outcome of cumulative change along with expansion of population. To understand if a given population will expand or evolve, Hawley questioned whether "complexity and scale were concurrent." He concluded that "when complexity and scale advance more or less together, the effect is growth or expansion rather than evolution". By understanding the concepts behind population expansion and evolution, Hawley explored how all organisms are connected to the environment and through behavior.

Amos Hawley believed that organisms are connected in a web of relationships that interdependent and are enmeshed with the environment. In the web of relationships organisms can have relationships of symbiosis or commensalism. Symbiosis is the close bond relationship between the two individuals of two different species. Commensalism is when organisms make similar demands on the environment often resulting in competition. Hawley believed humanity was dominant in the ecosystem due to advances in technology and humanity's control over the habitat. He contended that through culture humanity is able to modify its subsistence to match its needs and desires. Hawley writes "thus the development of human dominance through the agency of culture involves a reconstruction of the biotic community. Instead of accommodating his activities, as do primitive peoples, to the natural life association, civilized man regulates the biotic community in accordance with his needs".
