= Mitzie =

Surname list

Mitzie is the given name of the following people

- Mitzie Collins (born 1941), British and American traditional musician
- Mitzie Hunter (born 1971), Canadian provincial politician in Ontario
- Mitzie Jessop Taase, American Samoan attorney

== See also ==
- Mitzi
