= 1930s in anthropology =

- 1920s
- 1930s in anthropology
- 1940s
Other topics in 1930s:
- Comics
- Fashion
- Music
- Science and technology
- Sociology
- Television

This is a Timeline of anthropology, 1930–1939.

== Events ==
1934

- The Nihon Minzoku Gakkai (Japanese institute of Ethnology) is founded

1937

- The Musée de l'Homme is founded

== Publications ==
1934

- Patterns of Culture, by Ruth Benedict.

1935

- Structure and Function in Primitive Society, by Alfred Radcliffe-Brown
- Coral Gardens and Their Magic, by Bronislaw Malinowski

1937

- Witchcraft, Oracles and Magic Among the Azande, by E.E. Evans-Pritchard

== Births ==
1930

- Lewis Binford
- Pierre Bourdieu
- Laura Nader
- Marshall Sahlins

1934

- Maurice Godelier

1935

- Roger Keesing
- Barbara Myerhoff

1939

- Mary Bateson
- Maurice Bloch

== Deaths ==
1930

- Jessie Walter Fewkes

1934

- Roland Burrage Dixon
- Fritz Graebner
- Berthold Laufer

1935

- Walter Hough

1936

- Vladimir Bogoraz

1937

- John Napoleon Brinton Hewitt
- Vladimir Jochelson
- Grafton Elliot Smith

1939

- Arthur Maurice Hocart
- Lucien Lévy-Bruhl
- Edward Sapir
