= Missy (disambiguation) =

Missy is a feminine first name.

Missy may also refer to:

== Places ==
- Missy, Calvados, a commune in the Calvados département, France
- Missy, Switzerland, a municipality in the canton of Vaud, Switzerland

== Other uses ==
- Missy (cow), the most expensive cow in the world
- A variant of the title Miss, used to describe a young woman
- MISSY, Microdata Information System

== People with the surname de Missy ==
- César de Missy (1703–1775), Prussian theologian, chaplain to King George III, New Testament scholar and book collector
- Jean Rousset de Missy (1686–1762), French Huguenot writer, historian and journalist
- Samuel de Missy (1755-1820), French trader and businessman

== See also ==
- Missy-aux-Bois, a town and commune in the Aisne département, France
- Missy-lès-Pierrepont, a village and commune in the Aisne département
- Missy-sur-Aisne, a village and commune in the Aisne département
- Misses, a standard women's clothing sizes in the United States
- Mizzi (disambiguation)
- Mizzy (disambiguation)
