= 1940s in comics =

- 1930s
- 1940s in comics
- 1950s
Other topics in 1940s:
- Anthropology
- Fashion
- Motorsport
- Music
- Science and technology
- Sociology
- Television

See also: 1930s in comics, 1950s in comics and the list of years in comics

Publications: 1940 - 1941 - 1942 - 1943 - 1944 - 1945 - 1946 - 1947 - 1948 - 1949

== Events ==
=== 1940 ===
The Justice Society of America, the first superhero team in comic book history first appear in All Star Comics #3. The team is conceived by editor Sheldon Mayer and writer Gardner Fox.

Captain America, created by Joe Simon and Jack Kirby, first appears in Captain America Comics #1, published by Timely Comics.

=== 1941 ===
Wonder Woman, created by William Moulton Marston, first appears in All Star Comics #8. She is among the first and most famous comic book superheroines.

Stan Lee becomes editor-in-chief at Timely Comics.

Adventures of Captain Marvel, a twelve-chapter film serial adapted from the popular Captain Marvel comic book character for Republic Pictures, debuts. It was the first film adaptation of a comic book superhero.

Archie Andrews, created by Bob Montana first appears in Pep Comics #22, published by MLJ Magazines.

Plastic Man, created by writer-artist Jack Cole, first appears in Police Comics #1, published by Quality Comics.

=== 1942 ===
Crime Does Not Pay debuts, edited and mostly written by Charles Biro and published by Lev Gleason Publications. It was the first "true crime" comic series and also the first comic in the crime comics genre. One of the most popular comics of its day, at its height the comic wo

=== 1944 ===
Charlton Comics, an American comic book publisher, publishes its first title, Yellowjacket, an anthology of superhero and horror stories, under the imprint Frank Comunale Publications. The company would begin publishing under the Charlton name in 1946.

Superboy, the adventures of Superman as a boy, first appears in More Fun Comics #101. The character is currently the subject of a legal battle between Time Warner, the owner of DC Comics, and the estate of Jerry Siegel. The Siegel estate claims that the original "Superboy" character published by DC Comics is an independent creation that used ideas from Jerry Siegel's original rejected pitch and was created without his consent.

=== 1946 ===
The All-Winners Squad, the first superhero team in the Marvel Universe, first appears in All Winners Comics #19, published by Timely Comics.

Sazae-san, by Machiko Hasegawa debuts in Fukunichi Shimbun.

=== 1947 ===
Li'l Folks, the first comic strip by Peanuts creator Charles M. Schulz, debuts mainly in Schulz's hometown paper, the St. Paul Pioneer Press, on June 22. Li'l Folks can almost be regarded as an embryonic version of Peanuts, containing characters and themes which were to reappear in the later strip: a well-dressed young man with a fondness for Beethoven a la Schroeder, a dog with a striking resemblance to Snoopy, and even a boy named Charlie Brown.

=== 1948 ===
The Association of Comics Magazine Publishers (ACMP) forms on July 1, 1948, to regulate the content of comic books in the face of increasing public criticism. Founding members included publishers Leverett Gleason of Lev Gleason Publications, Bill Gaines of EC Comics, Harold Moore (publisher of Famous Funnies) and Rae Herman of Orbit Publications. Henry Schultz served as executive director.

== Publications ==
=== 1940 ===
- Daring Mystery Comics #1 - Timely Comics
- Red Raven Comics #1 - Timely Comics
- Human Torch Comics #2 renamed from Red Raven Comics - Timely Comics
- Mystic Comics #1 - Timely Comics
- Double Action Adventure #2, January - National Periodicals - DC
- Double Action Detective #3, February - National Periodicals - DC
- Flash Comics #1 - All American Comics
- The Flame #1, Summer - Fox Comics
- Rex Dexter of Mars #1, July - Fox Comics
- The Blue Bolt #1, June - Fox Comics
- Weird Comics #1, July - Fox Comics

=== 1941 ===
- All Winners Comics #1 - Timely Comics
- Captain America Comics #1 - March, 1941, Timely Comics
- Human Torch Comics #5 renumbered from #6 - Timely Comics
- Sub-Mariner Comics #1 - Timely Comics
- USA Comics #1 - Timely Comics
- Young Allies Comics #1 - Timely Comics

=== 1942 ===
- Comedy Comics #9 renamed from Daring Mystery Comics - Marvel Comics
- Crime Does Not Pay #1 - Lev Gleason Publications
- Joker Comics #1 - Marvel Comics
- Krazy Komics #1 - Marvel Comics
- Terry-Toons Comics #1 - Marvel Comics
- Tough Kid Squad Comics #1 - Marvel Comics

=== 1943 ===
- All Select Comics #1 - Marvel Comics
- All Surprise Comics #1 - Marvel Comics
- Kid Komics #1 - Marvel Comics
- Miss Fury Comics #1 - Marvel Comics
- Powerhouse Pepper Comics #1 - Marvel Comics
- The United States Marines #1-8 changes publisher to Magazine Enterprises / Sussex Pb in 1952 - William H Wise & Company

=== 1944 ===
- Amazing Comics #1 - Marvel Comics
- Comic Capers #1 - Marvel Comics
- Daring Comics #9 revived and renamed from Daring Mystery Comics - Marvel Comics
- Animated Funny Comics-Tunes #16 spin-off from Krazy Komics - Marvel Comics
- Gay Comics #1 - Marvel Comics
- Gay Comics #18 spin-off from Animated Funny Comics-Tunes - Marvel Comics
- Ideal Comics #1 - Marvel Comics
- Junior Miss #1 - Marvel Comics
- Miss America Comics #1 - Marvel Comics
- Miss America Magazine #2 renamed from Miss America Comics - Marvel Comics
- Mystic Comics #1 - Marvel Comics
- Super Rabbit #1 - Marvel Comics
- Tessie the Typist #1 - Marvel Comics
- Ziggy Pig Silly Seal Comics #1 - Marvel Comics

=== 1945 ===
- Animated Movie-Tunes #1 - Marvel Comics
- Complete Comics #2 renamed from Amazing Comics - Marvel Comics
- Dopey Duck Comics #1 - Marvel Comics
- Funny Frolics #1 - Marvel Comics
- Georgie Comics #1 - Marvel Comics
- Komic Kartoons #1 - Marvel Comics
- Krazy Krow #1 - Marvel Comics
- Millie the Model #1 - Marvel Comics
- Miss America Magazine #1 renumbered from #7 - Marvel Comics
- Miss America Magazine #1 renumbered from #7 (#13) - Marvel Comics
- Nellie the Nurse #1 - Marvel Comics
- Patsy Walker #1 - Marvel Comics
- Silly Tunes #1 - Marvel Comics

=== 1946 ===
- Kid Movie Komics #11 renamed from Kid Komics - Marvel Comics
- Mighty Mouse #1 - Marvel Comics
- Miss America Magazine #1 renumbered from #7 (#19) - Marvel Comics
- Miss America Magazine #1 renumbered from #7 (#25) - Marvel Comics
- Movie Tunes Comics #3 renamed from Animated Movie-Tunes - Marvel Comics
- Wacky Duck Comics #3 renamed from Dopey Duck Comics - Marvel Comics
- Willie Comics #5 renamed from Ideal Comics - Marvel Comics

=== 1947 ===
- All Teen Comics #20 renamed from All Winners Comics - Marvel Comics
- Blonde Phantom #12 renamed from All Select Comics - Marvel Comics
- Cindy Comics #27 renamed from Krazy Komics - Marvel Comics
- Frankie Comics #4 renamed from Movie Tunes Comics - Marvel Comics
- Jeanie Comics #13 renamed from All Surprise Comics - Marvel Comics
- Junior Miss #24 spin-off from Human Torch Comics - Marvel Comics
- Justice Comics #7 renamed from Wacky Duck Comics - Marvel Comics
- Hedy De Vine Comics #22 spin-off from Teen Comics - Marvel Comics
- Margie Comics #35 renamed from Comedy Comics - Marvel Comics
- Miss America Magazine #1 renumbered from #7 (#31) - Marvel Comics
- Miss America Magazine #1 renumbered from #4 (#34) - Marvel Comics
- Official True Crime Cases #23 spin-off from Sub-Mariner Comics - Marvel Comics
- Oscar Comics #24 renamed from Funny Comics Tunes - Marvel Comics
- Oscar Comics #3 renumbered from #26 - Marvel Comics
- Rusty Comics #12 renamed from Kid Movie Komics - Marvel Comics
- Teen Comics #21 renamed from All Teen Comics - Marvel Comics

=== 1948 ===
- All Winners Comics #1 - Marvel Comics
- All-True Crime Cases #26 renamed from Official True Crime Cases - Marvel Comics
- Annie Oakley #1 - Marvel Comics
- Blackstone the Magician #2 renamed from Blackstone the Magician Detective Fights Crime - Marvel Comics
- Blackstone the Magician Detective #3 renamed from Blackstone the Magician - Marvel Comics
- Blaze Carson #1 - Marvel Comics
- Comedy Comics #1 - Marvel Comics
- Complete Mystery #1 - Marvel Comics
- Crime Exposed #1 - Marvel Comics
- Crimefighters #1 - Marvel Comics
- Frankie and Lana #13 renamed from Frankie Comics - Marvel Comics
- Ideal Comics #1 - Marvel Comics
- Justice Comics #4 renumbered from #10 - Marvel Comics
- Kid Colt #1 - Marvel Comics
- Krazy Komics #1 - Marvel Comics
- Lana #1 - Marvel Comics
- Lawbreakers Always Loose! #1 - Marvel Comics
- Mitzi Comics #1 - Marvel Comics
- Mitzi's Boyfriend #2 renamed from Mitzi Comics - Marvel Comics
- My Romance #1 - Marvel Comics
- Namora #1 - Marvel Comics
- Spirou et l'aventure by Jijé, Dupuis
- Spirou et Fantasio by André Franquin, Dupuis
- Sun Girl #1 - Marvel Comics
- Tex Morgan #1 - Marvel Comics
- Tex Taylor #1 - Marvel Comics
- Two-Gun Kid #1 - Marvel Comics
- Venus #1 - Marvel Comics
- Wacky Duck #1 - Marvel Comics
- Wild West #1 - Marvel Comics
- Wild Western #3 renamed from Wild West - Marvel Comics
- Witness #1 - Marvel Comics

=== 1949 ===
- Actual Romances #1 - Marvel Comics
- All True Crime #35 renamed from All True Crime Cases - Marvel Comics
- All Western Winners #2 renamed from All Winners Comics - Marvel Comics
- Amazing Mysteries #32 spin-off from Sub-Mariner Comics - Marvel Comics
- Awful Oscar #11 renamed from Oscar Comics - Marvel Comics
- Best Love #33 spin-off from Sub-Mariner Comics Marvel Comics
- Best Western #58 revived and renamed from Terry-Toons Comics - Marvel Comics
- Blaze the Wonder Collie #2 renamed from Mollie Manton's Romances - Marvel Comics
- Casey Crime Photographer #1 - Marvel Comics
- Cowboy Romances #1 - Marvel Comics
- Cupid #1 - Marvel Comics
- Faithful #1 - Marvel Comics
- Film Funnies #1 - Marvel Comics
- Frankie Fuddle #16 renamed from Frankie and Lana - Marvel Comics
- Girl Comics #1 - Marvel Comics
- Kid Colt Outlaw #5 renamed from Kid Colt - Marvel Comics
- Li'l Willie #21 renamed from Willie Comics - Marvel Comics
- Little Aspirin #1 - Marvel Comics
- Little Lana #1 renamed from Lana - Marvel Comics
- Little Lenny #1 - Marvel Comics
- Little Lizzie #1 - Marvel Comics
- Love Adventures #1 - Marvel Comics
- Love Classics #1 - Marvel Comics
- Love Dramas #1 - Marvel Comics
- Love Romances #1 renamed from Ideal Comics - Marvel Comics
- Love Dramas #1 - Marvel Comics
- Love Secrets #1 - Marvel Comics
- Love Tales #36 spin-off from Human Torch Comics - Marvel Comics
- Lovers #23 renamed from Blonde Phantom - Marvel Comics
- Rex Hart #6 renamed from Blaze Carson - Marvel Comics
- Man Comics #1 - Marvel Comics
- Marvel Tales #93 renamed from Marvel Mystery Comics - Marvel Comics
- Mitzi's Romances #8 renamed from Mitzi's Boyfriend - Marvel Comics
- Mollie Manton's Romances #1 - Marvel Comics
- My Diary #1 - Marvel Comics
- My Love #1 - Marvel Comics
- My Own Romance #4 renamed from My Romance - Marvel Comics
- Oscar Comics #13 renamed from Awful Oscar - Marvel Comics
- Our Love #1 - Marvel Comics
- Rangeland Love #1 - Marvel Comics
- Romance Diary #1 - Marvel Comics
- Romance Tales #7 spin-off from Western Winners - Marvel Comics
- Romances of the West #1 - Marvel Comics
- Sports Stars #1 - Marvel Comics
- Suspense #1 - Marvel Comics
- Tiny Tessie #24 renamed from Tessie the Typist - Marvel Comics
- True Adventures #3 renamed from True Western - Marvel Comics
- True Complete Mystery #5 renamed from Complete Mystery - Marvel Comics
- True Life Tales #1 - Marvel Comics
- True Western #1 - Marvel Comics
- Western Life Romances #1 - Marvel Comics
- Western Outlaws and Sheriffs #60 renamed from Best Western - Marvel Comics
- Western Winners #5 renamed from All Western Winners - Marvel Comics
- Wonder Duck #1 - Marvel Comics
- Young Hearts #1 - Marvel Comics
