= Cyberstar =

Things commonly known as cyberstar or cyberstars include:

- Internet celebrity
- virtual actor, a computer-generated human-like entity in a film
- Cyberstar, the animatronic and video controller for Chuck E. Cheese's and Showbiz Pizza Place
