= 20th century in fashion =

20th century in fashion may refer to:

- 1900s in fashion
- 1910s in fashion
- 1920s in fashion
- 1930s in fashion
- 1940s in fashion
- 1950s in fashion
- 1960s in fashion
- 1970s in fashion
- 1980s in fashion
- 1990s in fashion
- History of fashion design
