= 1930s in comics =

- 1920s
- 1930s in comics
- 1940s
Other topics in 1930s:
- Anthropology
- Fashion
- Music
- Science and technology
- Sociology
- Television

See also: 1920s in comics, other events of the 1930s, 1940s in comics and the list of years in comics

Publications: 1930 - 1931 - 1932 - 1933 - 1934 - 1935 - 1936 - 1937 - 1938 - 1939

== Publications ==
=== 1930 ===
- September 8: Debut of Blondie by Chic Young.

=== 1931 ===
  - April 17: In E.C. Segar's Thimble Theatre Popeye first quotes his classic line: "I yam what I yam an' tha's all I yam."
  - June 26: In E.C. Segar's Thimble Theatre spinach is introduced as the source of Popeye's power.
  - October 4: Debut of Dick Tracy by Chester Gould.

=== 1932 ===
- March 20: In E. C. Segar's Thimble Theatre, J. Wellington Wimpy first says "I would gladly pay you Tuesday for a hamburger today.

=== 1933 ===
- Eastern Color Printing begins business as a publisher of comic books. Historians consider Famous Funnies, printed this year by Eastern in tandem with Dell Comics, to be the first modern comic book, though this one was mostly a test giveaway at Woolworth's Department Stores.
- July 14: The Fleischer Studios animated debut of Popeye, in the Betty Boop short Popeye the Sailor.

=== 1934 ===
- May: Famous Funnies (cover dated July) is relaunched by Eastern Color and becomes the first full-color comic book sold to the public.
- August 13: Al Capp's Li'l Abner debuts.
- September: Rube Goldberg's Boob McNutt comic strip ends.
- Autumn: National Allied Publications, Inc., one of the two companies to eventually become National Comics Publications (later DC Comics), forms.
- October 22: Milton Caniff's Terry and the Pirates debuts.

=== 1935 ===
- February: National Allied Publications published New Fun Comics, which was the first comic book to contain wholly original material rather than reprints of newspaper comic strips. The series would go on to debut the characters Doctor Fate, Aquaman, Green Arrow, and The Spectre.
- December: New Comics, which would be retitled to New Adventure Comics and then Adventure Comics, debuted from National Allied Publications. The series would later feature the debuts of Hourman, Sandman, Starman, and Jack Kirby's Manhunter.

=== 1937 ===
- March: National Comics Publications begins publication of Detective Comics. Batman would debut in issue #27, National became so well known for the series that they changed their name to DC Comics, and the series would run continuously until 2011, becoming the longest continuously published comic series in American history.
- October 17: Huey, Dewey, and Louie first appear in Al Taliaferro's Donald Duck comic strip.

=== 1938 ===
- June: National Comics Publications publishes Action Comics #1, the first appearance of Superman. The comic launched the superhero industry and along with company title Detective Comics, became one of the longest running comic book titles, with continuous publication since 1938 (with a minor gap from 2011-2016).

=== 1939 ===
- Many influential comics companies, including Archie Comics, Fawcett Comics, Fox Feature Syndicate, Lev Gleason Publications, Quality Comics, and Timely Comics (later Marvel) were founded this year.
- May: First appearances of Batman and James Gordon in Detective Comics #27.
- August: Publication of Mystery Men Comics by Fox Feature Syndicate begins, debuting the Blue Beetle (as Dan Garret).
- October: Timely Comics publishes Marvel Comics #1, renamed next issue to Marvel Mystery Comics. The original Human Torch and Namor the Sub-Mariner debut in this issue.
