= Tonette S. Rocco =

American academic (born 1954)

Tonette S. Rocco (born 1954) is an American academic in the field of educational policy studies, adult education, and human resource development. She is recognized for her contributions as a social justice advocate and her dedication to mentoring emerging scholars. Rocco serves as a professor in the Department of Educational Policy Studies at Florida International University (FIU). She was inducted into the International Adult and Continuing Education Hall of Fame in 2016, a recognition that honors her extensive contributions to adult education and human resource development, particularly through the lens of social justice education.

== Education ==
Rocco’s educational journey began at The Ohio State University, where she pursued four degrees across multiple disciplines. She earned a Bachelor of Science in Business Administration, followed by a Master of Science in Labor and Human Resources, a Master of Education, and ultimately, a Doctor of Philosophy in Adult Education and Human Resource Development. Rocco co-founded the student organization Students for Disability Awareness. She received the Board of Trustees Recognition from Ohio State University for her role in founding a student organization, a rare honor listed among her notable awards.

== Career ==
While completing her graduate studies, Rocco worked for the university’s Center of Special Needs Populations, where as part of a team worked to assist school systems to meet the requirements of the Individuals with Disabilities Education Act 1990. At Ohio State’s Lima campus she managed programs addressing welfare-to-work and school-to-work transitions.

Rocco joined Florida International University in 2000. She spearheaded the creation of FIU’s College of Education Research Conference, which later expanded into the South Florida Education Research Conference, involving collaboration with 12 universities across the region. The conference provided space for students and faculty focused on lifelong education and learning in all disciplines.

She directed the Office of Academic Writing and Publication Support for five years, where she worked to support graduate students and faculty in their writing and publication efforts. Rocco also played an instrumental role in the development and transformation of the academic journal New Horizons in Adult Education, which was the first U.S. gold open access scholarly journal first published in 1987 by Syracuse University and later published by Nova Southeastern University. She eventually became editor-in-chief of the journal, which was later renamed New Horizons in Adult Education and Human Resource Development.

As of February 2024, Rocco is a professor of Adult Education and Human Resource Development in the Department of Educational Policy Studies.

== Accomplishments ==
Rocco’s earned awards and recognition for her scholarly work and leadership in the field including being in the last of five cohorts of Cyril O. Houle Scholars in Adult and Continuing Education and being an Ewha Global Fellow, Ewha Woman’s University, Korea. In 2008, she received the Elwood F. Holton, III Research Excellence Award for the article, Towards the employability-link model: Current employment transition to future employment perspectives co-authored with Jo Thijssen and Beatrice Van der Heiden. In 2009, she received the University Continuing Education Association’s Frandson Book Award for her influential work Challenging the Professionalization of Adult Education. In 2014, two of her major publications, Handbook of HRD and Routledge Companion to HRD, received the Forward Award from the Academy of Human Resource Development (AHRD). In 2015, Rocco was honored with two awards from AHRD: the Monica M. Lee Research Excellence Award for the article “Connection, Value, and Growth,” co-authored with Maria S. Plakhotnik, Joshua C. Collins, and Hilary Landorf, and the Laura Bierema Excellence in Critical HRD Award, which recognized her advocacy for social justice in human resource development. The following year, Rocco received the designation Outstanding HRD Scholar and her book, co-edited with Robert Mizzi and Sue Shore, Disrupting Adult and Community Education received an honorable mention for the Phillip E. Frandson Award for Literature in the Field of Professional, Continuing, and/or Online Education.

Rocco has over 300 publications that include books, articles, chapters, and conference papers. Her research spans various themes, including continuing professional education, equity and privilege, critical race theory, disability, and qualitative methods. She has mentored over 34 doctoral students, and many of her mentees have published under her guidance and received awards for their dissertations and conference papers.

== Books ==
- Grace, André P.; Rocco, Tonette S. (June 2, 2009). Challenging the Professionalization of Adult Education: John Ohliger and Contradictions in Modern Practice. John Wiley & Sons. ISBN 978-0-7879-7827-3.
- Rocco, Tonette S.; Hatcher, Timothy Gary (February 9, 2011). The Handbook of Scholarly Writing and Publishing. John Wiley & Sons. ISBN 978-0-470-94921-4.
- Pane, Debra M.; Rocco, Tonette S. (February 5, 2014). Transforming the School-to-Prison Pipeline: Lessons from the Classroom. Springer Science & Business Media. ISBN 978-94-6209-449-9.
- Chalofsky, Neal F.; Rocco, Tonette S.; Morris, Michael Lane, eds. (November 10, 2014). Handbook of Human Resource Development. John Wiley & Sons. ISBN 978-1-118-45402-2.
- Poell, Rob F.; Rocco, Tonette S.; Roth, Gene L., eds. (September 25, 2014). The Routledge Companion to Human Resource Development. Routledge. ISBN 978-1-136-72706-1.
- Mizzi, Robert C.; Rocco, Tonette S.; Shore, Sue, eds. (May 12, 2016). Disrupting Adult and Community Education: Teaching, Learning, and Working in the Periphery. SUNY Press. ISBN 978-1-4384-6091-8.
- Rocco, Tonette S.; Smith, M. Cecil; Mizzi, Robert C.; Merriweather, Lisa R.; Hawley, Joshua D., eds. (2020). The handbook of adult and continuing education. Sterling, Virginia: Stylus Publishing, LLC. ISBN 978-1-62036-684-4.
- The Sage Handbook of Human Resource Development. (2024). United Kingdom: SAGE Publications.
- The Routledge Handbook of LGBTQ Identity in Organizations and Society. (2024). United Kingdom: Taylor & Francis.
- Building Peace and Community: Alternatives to Violence Project Around the World. (2024). Innovative Ink Publishing/Kendall Hunt

== Journal articles ==
- Gedro, Julie; Collins, Joshua C.; Rocco, Tonette S. (November 1, 2014). "The "Critical" Turn: An Important Imperative for Human Resource Development". Advances in Developing Human Resources. 16 (4): 529–535. doi:10.1177/1523422314543847. ISSN 1523-4223.
- Rocco, Tonette S.; Bernier, Judith D.; Bowman, Lorenzo (November 1, 2014). "Critical Race Theory and HRD: Moving Race Front and Center". Advances in Developing Human Resources. 16 (4): 457–470. doi:10.1177/1523422314544294. ISSN 1523-4223.
- Plakhotnik, Maria S.; Rocco, Tonette S.; Collins, Joshua C.; Landorf, Hilary (January 1, 2015). "Connection, value, and growth: how employees with different national identities experience a geocentric organizational culture of a global corporation". Human Resource Development International. 18: 39–57. doi:10.1080/13678868.2014.979009. ISSN 1367-8868.*
- Procknow, Greg; Rocco, Tonette S. (December 1, 2016). "The Unheard, Unseen, and Often Forgotten: An Examination of Disability in the Human Resource Development Literature". Human Resource Development Review. 15 (4): 379–403. doi:10.1177/1534484316671194. ISSN 1534-4843.
- Rios, Steve J.; Rocco, Tonette S. (April 24, 2014). "From Foster Care to College". Emerging Adulthood. 2 (3): 227–237. doi:10.1177/2167696814526715. ISSN 2167-6968.
