= 1930s in sociology =

- 1920s
- 1930s in sociology
- 1940s
Other topics in 1930s:
- Anthropology
- Comics
- Fashion
- Music
- Science and technology
- Television

The following events related to sociology occurred in the 1930s.

== 1930 ==
- Sigmund Freud's Civilization and Its Discontents is published.
- Maurice Halbwachs' The Causes of Suicide is published.
- Robert Redfield's Tepozltan: Life in a Mexican Village is published.
- Clifford Shaw's The Jack Roller: A Delinquent Boy's Own Story is published.
- Pitirim Sorokin's Rural Sociology is published.
- Leon Trotsky's History of the Russian Revolution is published.
- Founding of The Frankfurt School
- Howard W. Obum serves as President of the ASA

== 1931 ==
- Marc Bloch's French Rural History is published.
- Hans Freyer's Revolution of Right is published.
- Robert Morrison MacIver's Sociology is published.
- Alfred Radcliffe-Brown's Social organization of Australian tribes is published.
- R.H. Tawney's Equality is published.
- Emory S. Bogardus serves as president of the ASA.

=== Deaths ===
- April 26: George Herbert Mead
- June 11: Franklin H. Giddings
- December 13: Gustave Le Bon

== 1932 ==
- Henri Bergson's The Two Sources of Morality and Religion is published.
- George Elton Mayo's Human Problems of an Industrial Civilization is published.
- Alfred Radcliffe-Brown's Social organization of Australian tribes is published.
- R. H. Tawney's Land and Labour in China is published.
- Beatrice Webb's and Sidney Webb's Methods of Social Study is published.

== 1933 ==
- Alexander Carr-Saunders' The Professions is published.
- Friedrich Hayek's Monetary Theory and the Trade Cycle is published.
- William F. Ogburn's Recent Social Trends in the United States is published.
- Nazi party comes to power in Germany, many intellectuals flee, Ferdinand Tonnies is forced out his post as president of the German Society for Sociology and replaced by Hans Freyer

=== Births ===
- November 23: Ali Shariati

== 1934 ==
- Ruth Fulton Benedict's Patterns of Culture is published.
- Alexander Carr-Saunders' A Century of Pauperism is published.
- Morris Ginsberg's Sociology is published.
- George Herbert Mead's Mind, Self and Society is published.
- Hans Freyer suspends the activity of the German Society for Sociology.

=== Births ===
- Moisés Espírito Santo

== 1935 ==
- Antonio Gramsci's The Prison Notebooks are published.
- Harold Lasswell's Politics: Who Gets What, When, How is published.
- Helen Merrell Lynd's Middletown: A study in Cultural Conflicts is published.
- Bronislaw Malinowski's Coral Gardens and their Magic is published.
- Karl Mannheim's Man and Society in an Age of Reconstruction is published.
- Margaret Mead's Sex and Temperament in Three Primitive Societies is published.
- Ferdinand Tönnies' Geist der Neuzeit is published.
- Alfred Weber's Cultural History as Cultural Sociology is published.
- Sidney Webb's and Beatrice Webb's Soviet communism : a new civilisation ? is published.

== 1936 ==
- Gaetano Mosca's History of Political Doctrines is published.
- William F. Ogburn's The Social Effects of Aviation is published.
- Robert E. Park's Human Ecology is published.
- Edwin Sutherland's and H.J. Locke's 24,000 Homeless Men
- Edward Alexander Westermarck's The Future of Marriage in Western Civilisation is published.
- Ideology and Utopia, by Louis Wirth and Karl Mannheim, is published.
- Henry P. Fairchild serves as president of the ASA.
- The ASA begin publishing the American Sociological Review.

=== Deaths ===
- April 9: Ferdinand Tönnies
- April 27: Karl Pearson
- May 3: Robert Michels
- May 8: Oswald Spengler

== 1937 ==
- Sir Edward Evans-Pritchard's Witchcraft, Oracles and Magic among the Azande are published.
- Talcott Parsons' The Structure of Social Action is published.
- Leon Trotsky's The Revolution Betrayed is published.
- William Lloyd Warner's A Black Civilization: A Social Study of an Australian Tribe is published.

== 1938 ==
- Chester Barnard's The Functions of the Executive is published.
- Johann Huizinga's Homo Ludens is published.
- Serafin N. Macaraig's An Introduction to Sociology is published.
- Thomas Humphrey Marshall's Class Conflict and Social Stratification is published.
- Thomas Humphrey Marshall's The Population Problem: The Experts and the Public is published.
- Robert K. Merton's Social Structure and Anomie is published.
- Werner Sombart's Vom Menschen is published.
- Richard Titmuss's Poverty and Population is published.
- Louis Wirth's Urbanism as a way of life is published.
- Frank H. Hankins serves as president of the ASA.

=== Births ===
- January 18: Anthony Giddens

=== Deaths ===
- Paul Fauconnet

== 1939 ==
- Walter Benjamin's The Work of Art in the Age of its Technological Reproductibility is published.
- Ruth Durant's Watling: A Social Survey is published.
- Norbert Elias' The Civilizing Process is published.
- Fei Xiaotong's Peasant Life in China: A Field Study of Country Life in the Yangtze Valley is published.
- Edward Franklin Frazier's The Negro Family in the United States is published.
- Sigmund Freud's Moses and Monotheism is published.
- Alfred Radcliffe-Brown's Taboo is published.
- George Lundberg's Foundations of Sociology is published.
- Joseph Schumpeter's Business Cycles is published.
- Richard Titmuss' Our Food Problem is published.
