= International Association of Amusement Parks and Attractions =

Themed entertainment trade association

Coordinates: 38.8036808°N 77.0573128°W

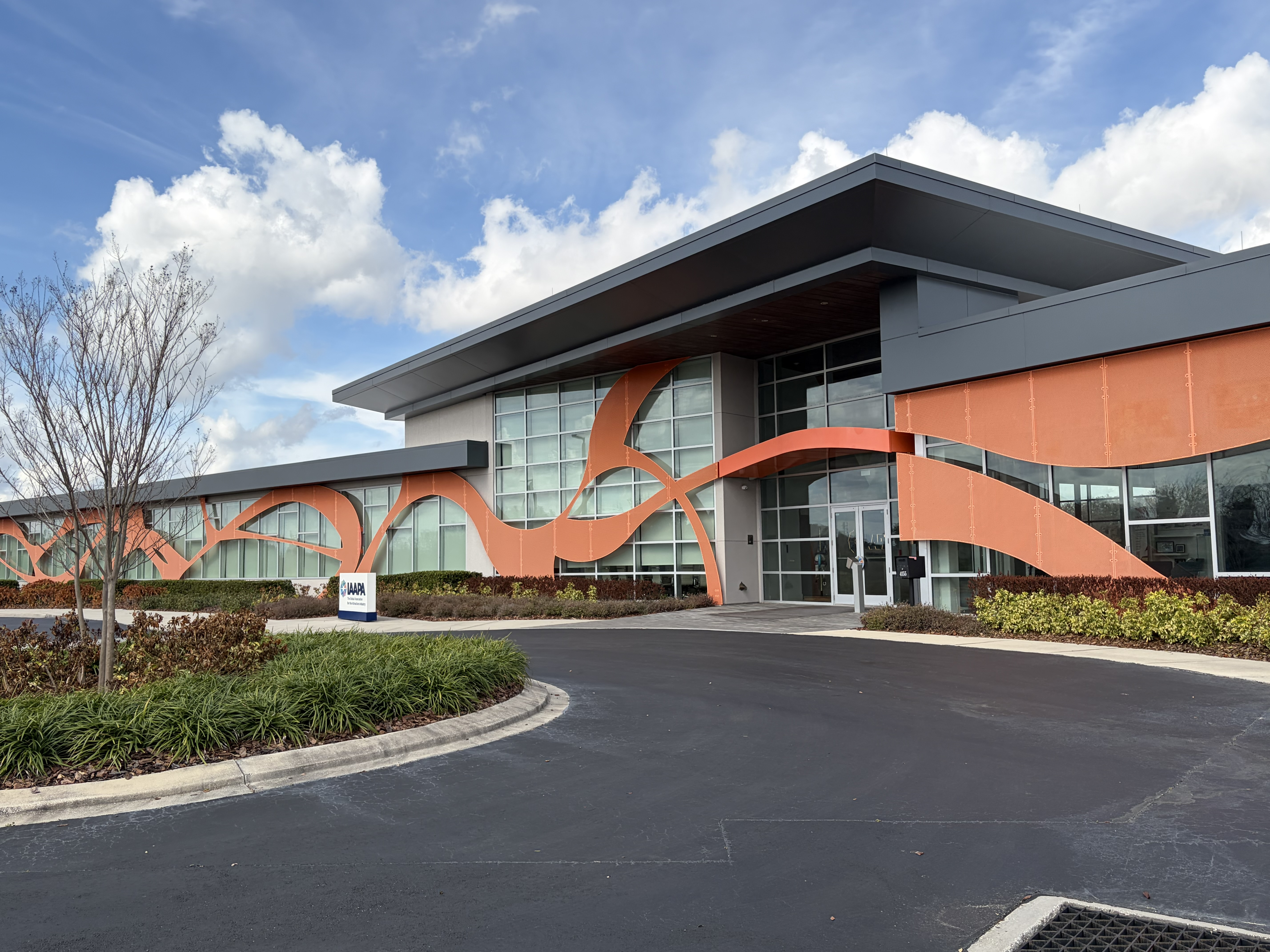
- IAPPA headquarters near Orlando, Florida
- Abbreviation: IAAPA
- Formation: 1918; 108 years ago
- Type: Trade association
- Tax ID no.: 36-2079990
- Legal status: 501(c)(6)
- Purpose: To promote safe operations, global development, professional growth, and commercial success of the amusement parks and attractions industry.
- Headquarters: Orlando, Florida, U.S.
- Region served: Worldwide
- Members: More than 6,800 (2022)
- President, Chief Executive Officer: Jakob Wahl
- Chair: Jim Pattison
- Subsidiaries: IAAPA Foundation _{(501(c)(3)},
- Revenue: US$24,117,204 (2017)
- Expenses: US$22,757,776 (2017)
- Endowment: $20,231,966 _{(2017)}
- Employees: 60 (Note: Includes employees working in the U.S. only.) (2017)
- Volunteers: 24 (2017)
- Website: www.iaapa.org

The International Association of Amusement Parks and Attractions (IAAPA) is a trade association for businesses and individuals involved in the traveling and stationary amusement industries.

IAAPA represents over 6,000 amusement-industry members in more than 100 countries worldwide and operates several global attractions-industry trade shows. Its annual IAAPA Expo in Orlando, Florida, is the world's largest attractions trade show in the number of attendees and exhibitors and providing members insight into current amusement trends, laws, operations and industry methodology. IAAPA promotes ride-safety guidelines in conjunction with ASTM International and assists its members to uphold the highest amusement-industry safety and professional standards.

IAAPA represents a variety of location-based entertainment facilities, including amusement and theme parks, family entertainment centers, arcades, museums, water parks, aquariums, science centers, zoos, and resorts. It also represents industry equipment manufacturers, distributors, operators, industry suppliers, and service providers.

IAAPA is a nonprofit organization with its headquarters in Orlando, Florida and regional offices in Brussels, Mexico City, Hong Kong, and Shanghai.

== History ==
In 1976, mechanical engineer Aaron Fechter displayed an animatronic head called "The Scab" at an IAAPA convention. The following year, he brought an ensemble of more advanced animatronics. These animatronics later became the central draw for the family entertainment pizza chain called ShowBiz Pizza Place.

In 1990, IAAPA established an international council in expand its global reach and give advice and direction about programs and services for members outside the United States. The council and its operations committee were instrumental in recruiting international members and developing quality products and services. IAAPA also established the IAAPA Hall of Fame, with amusement-industry pioneers its first class of inductees.

The following year, the 73rd annual convention and trade show in Orlando, Florida had over 19,000 attendees. The IAAPA Expo was the largest amusement-industry exhibition in the world, offering trends in amusement and arcade equipment, food, beverage, park technology and entertainment.

In 2000 the association worked to counter negative publicity following high-profile amusement-ride incidents and surrounding amusement safety, publicizing the industry's overall safety record. It established a ride-incident reporting system for its U.S. facilities with rides (releasing the initial results in 2003 through the National Safety Council), and helped facilitate independent scientific reviews of ride forces in 2002-03 indicating the inherent safety of rides for the general public. In 2000, IAAPA opened its first full-time overseas office (IAAPA Europe) in Brussels.

The organization acquired the Asian Amusement Expo (AAE) in 2003, but canceled the event because of the SARS outbreak in Asia. IAAPA maintained its focus on industry safety that year, establishing an international standards harmonization group to implement universal ride-safety criteria. In 2004, it helped spearhead the adoption of the ASTM International amusement-ride design and manufacture standard and the European standard for amusement machinery and structures.

Two years later, IAAPA joined the Travel Industry Association of America to produce "The Economic Impact of Domestic and Overseas Travelers Who Visit Amusement/Theme Parks and Other Attractions in the United States" on the importance of amusement, theme parks and other attractions to U.S. tourism and its wider economy. The association extended membership to casinos and resorts, since a number of facilities had incorporated amusement and entertainment features. To promote park safety, IAAPA made its ride incident reporting system mandatory for U.S. members and supported Europarks' efforts to implement a similar system for its members. IAAPA encouraged voluntary ride reporting by its global partners, supplying background materials.

In 2007 the association opened a new office in Europe with expanded programs and services and increased collaboration with Europarks on ride-safety reporting, and held its annual senior-level training program (the Institute for Executive Education) to the Wharton School of the University of Pennsylvania. At its Attractions Expo, the association unveiled its institute for emerging leaders (later renamed the Institute for Attractions Managers) to recruit candidates for senior-level positions.

The following year, IAAPA acquired the Euro Attractions Show (EAS). It held its first Middle East safety conference in Dubai in February, and had its inaugural Attractions Safety Awareness Week to enhance understanding of the industry's safety practices and record in June.

In 2010, the IAAPA Foundation was created as a 501(c)(3) organization to fund the development of education programs and information resources for the global attractions industry. The following year, the association implemented its certification program to help raise amusement-industry standards. Its Institute for Executive Education was revived in conjunction with San Diego State University, and IAAPA's first "Latin America State of the Industry Report" and "European Manifesto" were released. In September 2016, the association announced plans to move its headquarters from Alexandria, Virginia to Orlando in 2017 and to hold its expo in Orlando until 2030.

During the COVID-19 pandemic, the themed entertainment industry faced significant new pressures. IAAPA was among a number of themed entertainment organizations whose members faced potential tens of billions in losses as a result. As a result, IAAPA has asked the United States Congress to amend the Paycheck Protection Program to protect small businesses in the industry. The IAAPA Asia Expo had already been postponed by a year due to the pandemic, with the American expo stayed scheduled for November 2020.

In 2024, it was announced the first ever IAAPA Expo Middle East would take place March 30th – April 2nd of 2026, at the Abu Dhabi National Exhibition Centre in Abu Dhabi, United Arab Emirates.

As of early March 2026, CEO Jakob Wahl released a statement regarding the uncertain status of the anticipated expo in Abu Dhabi after retaliatory Iranian drone strikes on the United Arab Emirates following the U.S. and Israel's initial strikes on Iran.

Due to the strikes hitting hotels, the US Consulate in Dubai, and causing fires and damage to Dubai International Airport and Zayed International Airport, travel was almost entirely halted for several days. In Wahl's written statement, he included the following statement:

"First and foremost, I'm glad to say that we remain in constant communication with our team and our members in the region, and everyone is safe."

== Events and publications ==
The association operates IAAPA Expo, IAAPA Expo Asia, and IAAPA Expo Europe. At each show, IAAPA offers seminars and behind-the-scenes tours of member amusement parks, theme parks, water parks, and family entertainment centers. IAAPA publishes Funworld, an official magazine for members, and publishes "News Daily", a daily e-newsletter with industry news stories from around the world.

== Awards ==
The IAAPA Hall Of Fame was established in 1990 to celebrate achievements in and contributions to the growth and development of the amusement park and attractions industry. Its Service Awards honor members who excel in dedication to the association and the industry.
