= Robert L. Brock =

American businessman (1924–1998)

- Born: December 27, 1924; Pawnee Rock, Kansas, U.S
- Died: June 7, 1998 (aged 73); Dallas, Texas, U.S
- Occupation: Businessman
- Known for: Founding of ShowBiz Pizza Place
- Political party: Democratic

Robert L. Brock (December 27, 1924 – June 7, 1998) was an American businessman. He was born in Pawnee Rock, Kansas, and graduated from Sterling High School and the University of Kansas, where he was a member of Tau Kappa Epsilon fraternity.

He started a hospitality firm known as Inn Operations with a friend, selling it to Holiday Inns, Inc. in 1969 to cofound Topeka Inn Management with partner Edwin Lindquist. As chairman of TIM, he oversaw the first (and at the time largest) franchisee of Holiday Inns. Through TIM, he would be the co-founder of ShowBiz Pizza Place in February 1980, after reneging on a Pizza Time Theatre franchise agreement the year before. That May, Topeka Inn Management would be renamed to the Brock Hotel Corporation. Brock also founded the Residence Inn hotel chain with Jack DeBoer. Marriott later bought the brand and renamed all locations "Residence Inn by Marriott".

ShowBiz Pizza Place Inc. would acquire Pizza Time Theatre Inc.'s assets and intellectual property in 1984 after the latter's bankruptcy, forming ShowBiz Pizza Time, Inc. Brock Hotel Corp. would be reorganized as Integra — A Hotel and Restaurant Company in May 1988, and would spin off SBPT in January 1989. All SBPP locations were renamed Chuck E. Cheese's by 1994, and the parent company would be renamed CEC Entertainment Inc. in 1998.

He died on June 7, 1998 in Dallas, Texas.

== See also ==
- Chuck E. Cheese
- Aaron Fechter
- ShowBiz Pizza Place
- Nolan Bushnell
