= Aaron Fechter =

American engineering entrepreneur (born 1953)

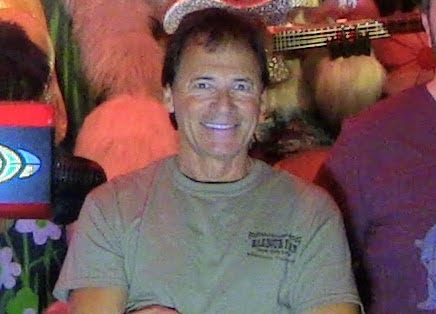
- Born: December 22, 1953 (age 72); Columbia, South Carolina, U.S.
- Occupations: Inventor; engineer; entrepreneur; voice actor; singer; musician
- Years active: 1973–present
- Known for: Creation of the Rock-afire Explosion
- Website: engineeringcreative.com

Aaron Melvin Fechter (born December 22, 1953) is an American mechanical engineer, entrepreneur, voice actor, singer, and musician who owns and operates Creative Engineering, Inc. (CEI). He is best known as the creator of the Rock-afire Explosion, an animatronic revue featuring a variety of characters created primarily for Showbiz Pizza Place restaurants throughout the 1980s. Disagreements between Showbiz and CEI, the chain's dwindling revenue, and Showbiz Pizza Time, Inc.'s push to unify the two chains it owned led to the show's eventual disappearance in the 1990s, with the majority of Rock-afire shows being retrofitted into Chuck E. Cheese's stable of characters.

In CEI's early beginnings, Fechter intended to manufacture fuel-efficient vehicles, but the company's focus soon shifted to the animatronic industry. The company later developed other products and concepts, but they failed to gain commercial interest. Fechter also claims to have been instrumental in the early development of Whac-A-Mole, an arcade game from Bandai that became popular in the late 1970s, but his involvement was never officially recognized. His animatronics gained renewed interest decades later, when fan-made Rock-afire Explosion performances set to modern music began appearing online in the mid-2000s. They also partially inspired the horror video game franchise, Five Nights at Freddy's.

== Early life and career ==
Aaron Fechter graduated from Edgewater High School in Orlando, Florida. In 1973, he graduated at the age of 19 from the University of South Florida, where he was a member of Tau Kappa Epsilon fraternity. The United States was in the midst of an energy crisis, and Fechter decided to build a fuel-efficient, small car prototype in hopes of eventually manufacturing the vehicle under a new car company. He founded Creative Engineering Incorporated (CEI) on March 1, 1975 for that purpose.

In order to raise money for the project, he resorted to selling smaller inventions door-to-door, such as his "Leaf Eater" contraption that collected leaves from swimming pools. Fechter happened to knock on the door of an individual who solicited his help in designing an electronic control system for a shooting gallery, designed for sale to amusement parks. The gallery featured an animatronic horse, and its success led to other offers in the animatronic industry. This became the central focus for Creative Engineering.

Fechter's father was an early investor in CEI, helping it enter the animatronic industry. Early projects included The Scab, a single talking head; Willie Wabbit, an anthropomorphic rabbit; and a fortune-telling machine called Lazlo The Great. By 1978, Fechter had finished work on "Wolf Pack 5", his first animatronic series featuring multiple characters, including The Wolfman, Fats, Dingo Starr, Beach Bear, and Little Queenie the Fox (later changed to a mouse and renamed Mini Mozzarella). It was showcased and deemed a success at the 1978 International Association of Amusement Parks and Attractions (IAAPA) show. He completed work on another animatronic show called "The Hard Luck Bears", featuring a hillbilly band of bears and a mimicking bird, which debuted at the IAAPA in 1979.

Fechter combined elements from both shows to form "The Rock-afire Explosion", which debuted at the IAAPA in 1980 with improved animation and other changes. The Rock-afire Explosion concept was ultimately selected by Showbiz for inclusion in its family entertainment pizza chain.

== Showbiz Pizza Place ==
In 1980, Robert L. Brock opened the first ShowBiz Pizza Place restaurant in Kansas City, Missouri, featuring Creative Engineering's Wolf Pack 5 display. Although ShowBiz wanted the "Rock-afire Explosion" (RAE) concept, RAE was still in the final stages of development when the first store opened. The pizza chain also featured such amenities as an arcade and restaurant tailored to accommodate both children and adults. Brock owned an extensive chain of Holiday Inn hotels, considered the largest of its kind at the time.

Brock originally partnered with Pizza Time Theatre but backed out after discovering Fechter's work. CEI was given a 20-percent ownership stake in the chain and retained all rights to characters, animation, and show development. Little Queenie the Fox was converted into a mouse and briefly became known as Mini Mozzarella at the first location. Her name was changed a final time to Mitzi Mozzarella as ShowBiz expanded and used RAE in future locations.

Following financial troubles in the mid-1980s, Showbiz explored the possibility of reverse-engineering the animatronics and producing their own shows. This led to a feud with CEI, which was unwilling to relinquish the rights needed.

In 1985, Showbiz purchased competitor Chuck E. Cheese's Pizza Time Theatre (CEC), which had filed for bankruptcy a year earlier. After failing to make progress with CEI, Showbiz severed ties with them in 1986. It began replacing the RAE with CEC characters in 1989, forming a new show called "Munch's Make Believe Band". All Showbiz locations, which were renamed Chuck E. Cheese's Pizza, were eventually converted by 1992.

== Other ventures ==
During CEI's involvement with Showbiz, the company also pursued interests outside of the restaurant industry. They explored the production of toys, including Billy Bob, Fatz, and Mitzi animatronic dolls that had the ability to play pre-recorded showtapes, narrate fairytales, and connect to an Apple II for custom programmability.

CEI invested $1.5 million in research and development of a secure messaging device called the Anti-Gravity Freedom Machine, capable of sending electronic messages over a phone line. By 1998, however, web-based email had gained traction, and the project was not released.

In 1996, animation from the New Rock-afire Explosion was used in a karaoke game shown at the IAAPA. In 1997, Looney Bird's was an experimental new restaurant created by Fechter that housed the classic RAE. One , Looney Bird's location used "The New Rock-Afire Explosion" show. Known as "Marvelously Electronic Animation", it debuted as a karaoke, trivia and video recording area that features an NRAE Looney Bird Robot. This is controlled with The Anti-Gravity Freedom Machine. In 2000, CEI developed The Mezmerizer, an arcade game licensed for manufacture to ICE that evolved into their Wheel of Fortune game.

The Starlauncher, developed in 2003 as "an American Idol kiosk", was never publicly released. In 2015, CEI showcased an arcade game at the IAAPA convention called Bashy Bug (stylized BASHyBUG), where the player attempts to stomp on a bug with a flipflop in a timed skill scenario with multiple levels of difficulty.

=== Carbohydrillium project ===
In 2010, CEI began research on an alternative cooking fuel derived from graphite and water called Carbohydrillium, billed as safer and less polluting than propane. On September 26, 2013, a catastrophic failure of a high-pressure carbon steel canister led to an explosion at the Creative Engineering warehouse in Orlando. A company operating as AquaLux had a similar explosion in 2001 at their plant in Largo, Florida, which at the time was blamed on a leaking fuel storage tank.

== In media and pop culture ==
Renewed interest in The Rock-Afire Explosion began with the release of several YouTube videos in the mid-2000s, such as "Ms. New Booty" by Chris Thrash, in which fans recreated several new RAE animations depicting modern musical themes. This led to the 2008 documentary, The Rock-afire Explosion, which explores the rise and fall of RAE and the influence of the childhood memories it created. Fechter, Thrash, and others were interviewed.

In 2014, indie game developer Scott Cawthon released Five Nights at Freddy's, a horror video game that takes place in a family entertainment restaurant setting similar to Chuck E. Cheese or Showbiz Pizza Place locations in the 1980s. Character and location designs from the Five Nights at Freddy's franchise notably resemble those of said establishments. In a Reddit post, Cawthon has spoken fondly of Showbiz Pizza Place and Fechter, but avoids implying connections between the two. Cawthon planned to include images of animatronic parts that he obtained from Fechter himself in the 2019 game Five Nights at Freddy's: Help Wanted, but ultimately decided against their inclusion to avoid negative attention toward Fechter.

In 2015, Fechter held a birthday party and tour of the Creative Engineering warehouse for young fans of Five Nights at Freddy's, a video of which was uploaded to YouTube on May 3, 2015.

In the 2016 film Keanu, by Keegan-Michael Key and Jordan Peele, a cat named Keanu jumps through the window of a fictional, abandoned building that used to manufacture animatronics. CEI characters such as Beach Bear, Billy Bob, and Fatz appear in the background.

In 2025, Lyrical Lemonade released a music video for P.O.V. by Clipse featuring Tyler, the Creator. In the video, the three perform the song in an abandoned dinner hall with several CEI characters miming the lyrics with them, both in "costume" and stripped down to most of their mechanical parts.

== See also ==
- Billy Bob's Wonderland
