= Robert Mizzi =

Canadian professor of education

- Occupation: Professor of education
- Awards: College of New Scholars, Artists and Scientists, Royal Society of Canada (2022); International Adult and Continuing Education Hall of Fame (2022)

Academic background
- Education: University of Windsor (BA, BEd); University of Alberta (MEd); York University (PhD)

Academic work
- Discipline: Education
- Sub-discipline: Adult education Educational administration Queer studies
- Institutions: University of Manitoba
- Notable ideas: Heteroprofessionalism
- Website: robertmizzi.com

Robert C. Mizzi is a Canadian professor of education at the University of Manitoba, where he serves as Canada Research Chair in Critical and Creative Continuous Learning. His scholarship focuses on adult and continuing education, educational administration, workplace learning, and the inclusion of 2SLGBTQ people in educational and organizational settings. He is also known for developing the concept of heteroprofessionalism.

== Early life and education ==
Mizzi grew up in rural and northern Canada. He earned an honours Bachelor of Arts in drama-in-education in 1996 and a Bachelor of Education in 1997 from the University of Windsor. He later received a Master of Education in international/global education from the University of Alberta in 2002, a Doctor of Philosophy in education from York University in 2011, and a graduate certificate in higher education online pedagogy from the University of Illinois Springfield in 2020.

== Career ==
From 2002 to 2004, Mizzi served as the professional development consultant for the Kosovo Educator Development Project, a Canadian-funded initiative that worked to rebuild the education system of Kosovo following the Kosovo War, where he led youth programming and a minority teacher training program. He then founded Queer Peace International, a Canada-based organization he directed from 2005 to 2010, which supported LGBTQ community groups in non-Western countries.

From 2011 to 2012, Mizzi held a SSHRC postdoctoral fellowship at Florida International University and then worked as an SSHRC research facilitator at Lakehead University from 2012 to 2013. He joined the University of Manitoba's Faculty of Education in 2013 as an assistant professor and later became an associate professor. He now serves as a professor in the Department of Educational Administration, Foundations and Psychology.

In 2020, Mizzi was appointed a Tier 2 Canada Research Chair in Queer, Community and Diversity Education. The chair was renewed in 2025 under the title Canada Research Chair in Critical and Creative Continuous Learning.

Mizzi has also held editorial and professional leadership roles in adult education. He served as president of the Canadian Association for the Study of Adult Education in 2018–2019 and as editor-in-chief of the Canadian Journal for the Study of Adult Education from 2019 to 2021.

In 2025, Mizzi created a 2SLGBTQIA+ teaching-resource for educators and with developing a related 2SLGBTQIA+ history mural in the Faculty of Education at the University of Manitoba.

== Research ==
Mizzi's research has spanned adult and continuing education, educational administration, workplace learning, and social inclusion. His work has examined how inclusion and creativity affect employee development, productivity, belonging, and satisfaction. His other research interests include 2SLGBTQ-inclusive policies and programs, teaching and leading for diversity, post-peace accord Northern Ireland from disability and LGBTQ perspectives, and intersectionality on university campuses. In 2024, Mizzi led a national study on rural 2SLGBTQ+ Pride events in Canada. Mizzi has also studied the experiences of Canadian-certified teachers working abroad and has commented publicly on provincial certification rules affecting their return to Canadian classrooms. Drawing on this research, he published Adventures in Teaching, a guide for international educators, in 2025.

== Selected works ==
- Mizzi, Robert C.; Rocco, Tonette S.; Shore, Sue (2016). Disrupting Adult and Community Education: Teaching, Learning, and Working in the Periphery. SUNY Press.
- Rocco, Tonette S.; Smith, M. Cecil; Mizzi, Robert C.; Merriweather, Lisa; Hawley, Joshua (2020). Handbook of Adult and Continuing Education. Routledge.
- Rodriguez, Nelson; Mizzi, Robert C.; Allen, Louisa; Cover, Rob (2023). Queer Studies and Education: An International Reader. Oxford University Press.
- Mizzi, R.C. (2025). Adventures in teaching: Your guide to becoming a successful international educator. Globespire Press.

== Awards and recognition ==
Mizzi received the University of Manitoba's Falconer Emerging Researcher Rh Award in the social sciences in 2018. In 2022, he was elected to the Royal Society of Canada's College of New Scholars, Artists and Scientists. The same year, he was inducted into the International Adult and Continuing Education Hall of Fame.
