= Mizzy =

Mizzy may refer to:

== People ==
- Vic Mizzy (1916–2009), American composer for television and movies
- Mizzy, artistic name of Maltese-British model, interior designer and artist Suzanne Mizzi (1967–2011)
- Mizzy Kusuda, a character from the Japanese manga series Harlem Beat
- "Mizzy" Pacheco, former lead singer for American alternative rock band Against All Will

== See also ==
- Missy (disambiguation)
- Mizzi (disambiguation)
