= Mizzi =

Mizzi is a surname of Maltese origin. Mizzi is also a German-language diminutive of the female given name Maria. Mizzi may refer to:

== As a surname ==
- Amy Mizzi (born 1983), Australian actress
- Bice Mizzi (1899–1985), Maltese pianist
- Dennis Mizzi (born 1964), Maltese footballer
- Enrico Mizzi (1885–1950), Maltese politician and Prime Minister
- Fortunato Mizzi (1844–1905), Maltese politician
- Jack Mizzi (born 2006), Maltese chess player
- Jamal al-Din al-Mizzi (1256–1341), Islamic scholar from the Levant
- Joe Mizzi, Maltese politician
- Konrad Mizzi (born 1977), Maltese politician
- Marlene Mizzi (born 1954), Maltese politician
- Philip Mizzi (born 1945), Maltese actor
- Robert Mizzi, Canadian academic
- Sorel Mizzi (born 1986), Canadian professional poker player
- Suzanne Mizzi (1967–2011), Maltese-British model, singer, interior designer and artist

== As a given name ==
- Mizzi Griebl (1872–1952), Austrian stage and film actress
- Mizzi Günther (1879–1961), Austrian opera singer
- Mizzi Kaspar (1864–1907), Austrian actress and royal mistress of Rudolf, Prince of Austria
- Mizzi Zwerenz (1876–1947), Austrian opera singer and actress

== See also ==
- Mitzi, a given name
- Mizzy (disambiguation)
