= Billy Bob's Wonderland =

Restaurant located in Barboursville, West Virginia

- Interactive map of Billy Bob's Wonderland

Restaurant information
- Established: 1986 (as ShowBiz Pizza Place); 1989 (as Billy Bob's)
- Owner: Mark Hoffman
- Location: 5 Cracker Barrel Dr, Barboursville, Cabell County, West Virginia, 25701, US
- Coordinates: 38°24′55.5156″N 82°15′19.3644″W
- Website: Official Website

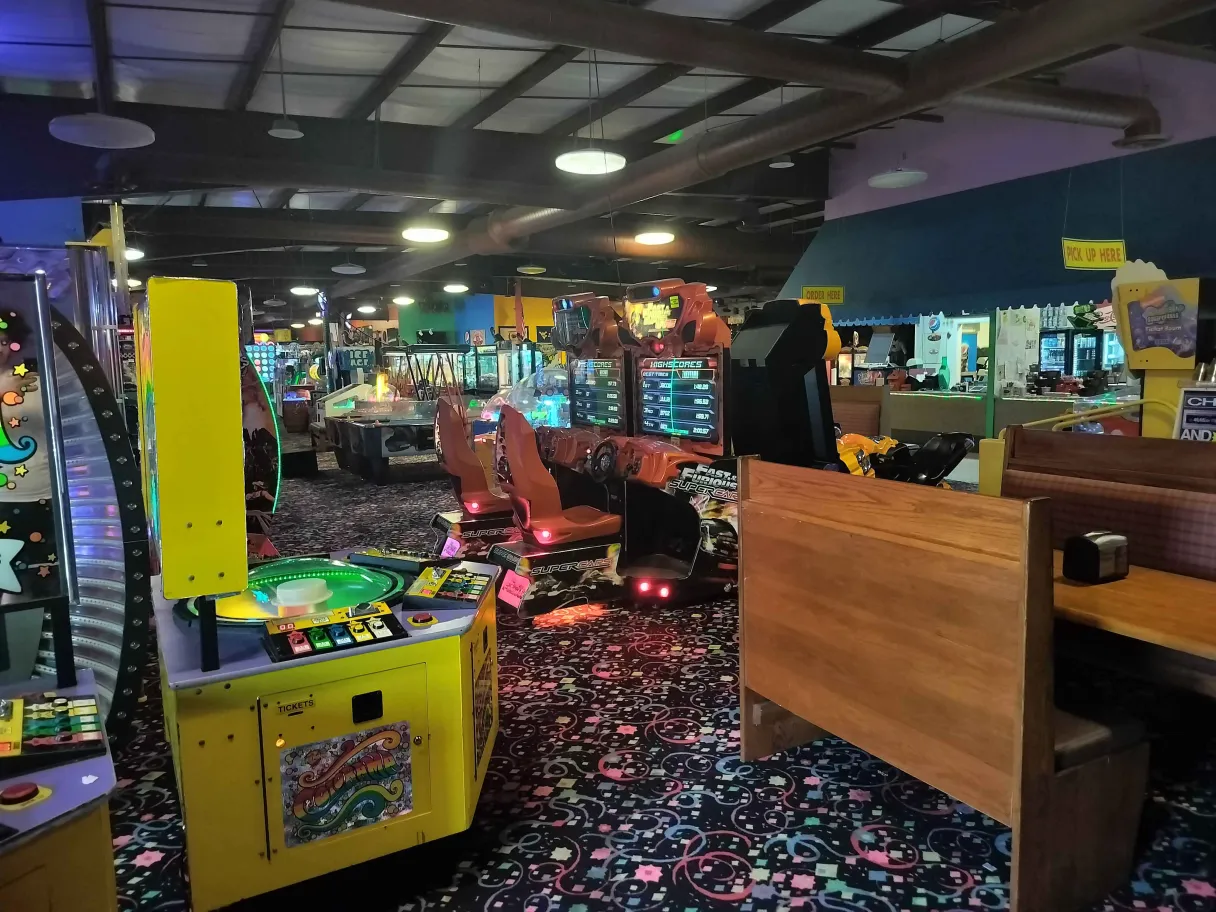
Interior of Billy Bob's Wonderland in 2024.

Billy Bob's Wonderland is a family entertainment center founded in Barboursville, West Virginia, near the Huntington Mall. It is significant for housing one of the last public Rock-afire Explosion animatronic bands, as well as being one of the few ShowBiz Pizza Place restaurants to cut ties with Showbiz Pizza Time, Inc. (which rebranded all locations company-wide to Chuck E. Cheese by 1992).

== History ==
In 1986, local businessman Rex Donahue opened a franchised ShowBiz Pizza Place store near the Huntington Mall in West Virginia. In the years following a 1985 merger between ShowBiz Pizza and Chuck E. Cheese (Showbiz Pizza Time, Inc. forming as the parent company), plans were outlined to replace Rock-afire animatronic shows with the Chuck E. Cheese characters by 1990. This resulted from years of ongoing disputes between SPT and Creative Engineering, Inc. (which created the Rock-afire) that arose over the exclusive rights. This conversion initiative (referred to as "Concept Unification") involved replacing props and animatronic cosmetics to reflect the new "Munch's Make Believe Band" with the characters of Chuck E. Cheese, though retaining the original Rock-afire mechanisms and control systems. Just a year before Concept Unification began, Donahue terminated his franchise agreement with Showbiz Pizza Time, rebranding his ShowBiz Pizza store as "Billy Bob's Wonderland" in 1989.

Later in the 1990s, two more Billy Bob's Wonderland locations opened: one in Charleston, West Virginia and another in Ashland, Kentucky. These two sister locations, along with the original Barboursville store, were shuttered by 2002. Their combined assets were immediately consolidated into one large space across the street from the former ShowBiz store. This new Barboursville location opened in 2003, which is currently operating today.

In 2023, Billy Bob's Wonderland was acquired by Fun City Arcade.

== The Rock-afire Explosion ==
=== Band members ===
==== Center stage ====
- Fatz Geronimo – keyboards, vocals

He is a silverback gorilla from New Orleans. He is a parody of real-life entertainers Fats Domino and Ray Charles. Unofficial band frontman, Fatz has a tendency to ramble. He introduces the most shows and orders other band members around, leading him and Rolfe DeWolfe into many arguments.

- Beach Bear – guitar, vocals

He is a wisecracking surfer polar bear with a laid-back attitude, who often keeps the peace along with Billy Bob. He was originally less intelligent and more frantic.

- Dook LaRue – drums, vocals

He is a mongrel from New Orleans with a smooth singing voice. He aspires to be an astronaut and wears a homemade space-themed suit. Slightly dimwitted, Dook often loses focus during shows and misses his cues.

- Mitzi Mozzarella – vocals

She is a mouse and a cheerleader. A conventional teenager, Mitzi is considered "loose" by the rest of the Rock-afire Explosion, and is obsessed with gossip, boyfriends, pop music, and Michael Jackson.

==== Stage left ====
- Billy Bob Brockali – bass (sometimes a guitar), vocals

He is a brown bear from Tennessee who wears yellow and red overalls and plays a wooden bass. His stage is themed as a service station, called Smitty's Super Service Station. Sweet and well-liked, Billy Bob is usually a mediator to the band's minor on-stage squabbles. He was the mascot for ShowBiz Pizza Place throughout its existence, and his image was on most of the chain's merchandise.

- Looney Bird – occasional vocals

He is a red tropical bird. Created as Billy Bob's unintelligent sidekick, he was originally addicted to the alcoholic gasoline sold at Smitty's. In the late 1980s, his personality would undergo a drastic change, and he would be portrayed as an inventor and scientific genius; he also became a more prominently featured character. Currently, his personality is neutral. Only Looney Bird's head is seen, as he rises and lowers from an oil drum. Some shows featured a segment where Looney Bird would answer fan mail. For this, the robot was retrofitted to include a pair of hands that held a piece of paper for him to read.

==== Stage right ====
- Rolfe DeWolfe and Earl Schmerle – A ventriloquist act

Originally intended to be a stand-up comedy routine performed in between musical sets, they soon became regularly featured alongside the band as vocalists. Rolfe is a wolf, and Earl is his sentient ventriloquist puppet. Rolfe, who rarely sings, is portrayed as arrogant with a tendency to be incredibly rude to both the band and the employees who work at ShowBiz. He has a fondness for disco music and the works of Frank Sinatra. Earl serves to balance out Rolfe, putting him down and calling him out frequently.

==== Other characters ====
The show also consists of several smaller prop characters, many of which do not have speaking roles. These include an animated Sun and Moon that provide background vocals, a birthday-themed spider named Antioch who speaks in gibberish, and a bear cub known as Choo-Choo, who hides in a small tree stump in front of Dook's drums and dances to the band's music. One of the more notable prop characters is Birthday Bird, who is perched on the neck of Billy Bob's guitar.

=== Disrepair and maintenance ===
Billy Bob's Wonderland is one of two last publicly operating animatronic Rock-afire Explosion shows in the United States, with the other being at the Volo Auto Museum in Volo, Illinois. Unlike Volo, Billy Bob's is infamous for its animatronics appearing in poor condition, with upkeep fluctuating among individuals who have volunteered to repair the Rock-afire. In 2013, Rock-afire creator Aaron Fechter was brought on to repair the show himself, but was reportedly refused any payment for his offered work and left. Following these events, the show continued to deteriorate until local help fully restored the band in 2021. A "Rock-afire Extravaganza" event was staged in January 2022 to mark the show's return. Due to renewed interest, an annual convention called Billy Con debuted in summer 2022.

== Popular culture ==
The opening scene of Self-Help was shot in Billy Bob's Wonderland.

== See also ==
- ShowBiz Pizza Place
- The Rock-afire Explosion
- Aaron Fechter, founder of Creative Engineering
