= Mitzi =

Mitzi or Mitzy (sometimes Mitzie) is a feminine given name of German origin. Originally a nickname for girls named Maria in German-speaking populations, Mitzi became a given name in its own right, even outside of Germany. Several early-20th-century American actresses chose it as part of their stage name, for example Mitzi Green and Mitzi Gaynor, increasing its popularity. In the United States, Mitzi first appeared on the Social Security Administration's list of the top 1,000 most popular names for baby girls in 1930, peaked in 1955, and has since fallen out of favor, dropping off the list entirely after 1979.

== People ==
- Mitzi Cajayon (born 1978), Filipino politician
- Mitzie Collins (born 1941), American folk musician
- Mitzi Cunliffe (1918–2006), American sculptor
- Mitzi Gaynor (1931–2024), American actress, singer and dancer born Francesca Marlene de Czanyi von Gerber
- Mitzi Green (1920–1969), American child actress born Elizabeth Keno
- Mitzi Hajos (1889–1970), Hungarian born American actress
- Mitzi Kapture (born 1962), American actress
- Mitzy Larue, a member of the National Assembly of Seychelles
- Mitzi Mayfair (1914–1976), stage name of American dancer and actress Emylyn Pique
- Mitzi McCall (born 1932), American comedienne and actress
- Mitzi Myers (1939–2001), American literary scholar
- Mitzi Perdue (born 1941), American author, philanthropist, and anti-human trafficking advocate
- Mitzi Shore, co-founder and operator of the Los Angeles comedy club The Comedy Store and mother of comedian and actor Pauly Shore.
- Montgomery McFate (born 1966), nicknamed "Mitzy", cultural anthropologist and defense and national security analyst
- Maria Reiter (1911–1992), known as "Mitzi", associated romantically with Adolf Hitler in the late 1920s
- Mitzy (fashion designer) (born 1955), Mexican fashion designer born Cebedeo García Cárdenas

== Fictional characters ==
- Mitzi, in the 1921 Broadway play Blossom Time
- Mitzi, in the 1950 Agatha Christie novel A Murder Is Announced
- Mitzi, in the 1932 film One Hour with You
- Mitzi, in the 1994 film The Adventures of Priscilla, Queen of the Desert and the subsequent musical
- Mitzi Mozzarella, the Animatronic Cheerleader Mouse in The Rock-afire Explosion Music Show
- Mitzy, in the 1998 animated series The Secret Files of the Spy Dogs
- Miss Mitzi, in the 2004 Peter Chelsom movie Shall We Dance
- Mitzi, in the 1986–1993 series Under the Umbrella Tree
- Mitzi, in the 2004 animated series Winx Club
- Mitzi Nohara, the mother of Shin-Chan in the Funimation English dub of Crayon Shin-chan in 2005
- Mitzi May, a female feline character from the Lackadaisy webcomics that debuted in 2006
- Mitzi, a skunk in the third season of the animated television series Littlest Pet Shop
- Spritzy Mitzi, in an episode of Doc McStuffins
- Mitzi, in the life-simulation videogame Animal Crossing
- Mitzi, in the 2012 psychological horror game The Cat Lady
- Mitzi, in the 2019 film The Queen's Corgi
- Mitzi Fabelman, in the 2022 film The Fabelmans, based on director Steven Spielberg's mother Leah Adler.
- Mitzy, in the 2022 horror film Pearl

== See also ==
- Mitzie, the dolphin who played Flipper in Flipper (1963 film)
- Mizzi (disambiguation)
