= Residence Inn by Marriott =

Extended-stay hotel chain run by Marriott International

- Industry: Extended stay hotels
- Founded: 1981
- Number of locations: 874 (2021)
- Area served: Worldwide except for Asia and Pacific Islands
- Parent: Marriott International
- Website: residenceinn.marriott.com

Residence Inn by Marriott is a brand of extended stay hotels. As of June 1, 2021, there were 874 Residence Inn hotels in the United States, Canada and Mexico with 107,680 rooms, plus an additional 243 hotels with 30,417 rooms in the development pipeline.

== History ==
The chain traces its roots back to in 1975, when Wichita, Kansas developer Jack DeBoer found himself with apartment properties that were facing unusually high vacancy rates. He repurposed one of the apartment buildings, converting the residential units to monthly rentals, and named it The Residence.

In 1981, DeBoer and developer Robert L. Brock (then the largest franchisee of Holiday Inn), formed a joint venture, launching a chain called The Residence Inn. The hotels focused on the "extended-stay" market, a term they invented. The hotels were aimed at guests staying five nights or more, who would not need conventional daily hotel maid service, which reduced operational costs. Their guests were mostly business travelers on lengthy work assignments, patients of nearby hospitals, and those in need of temporary housing.

In January 1985, Holiday Corporation, the parent company of Holiday Inn, bought a 50% stake in The Residence Inn chain. In early 1987, DeBoer bought back Holiday's interest in the chain, before selling the entire company to Marriott International on July 7, 1987. Although DeBoer died in 2021, the original Wichita property is still operated by his company, under the WaterWalk brand (now under the Wyndham flag).

== Accommodations ==
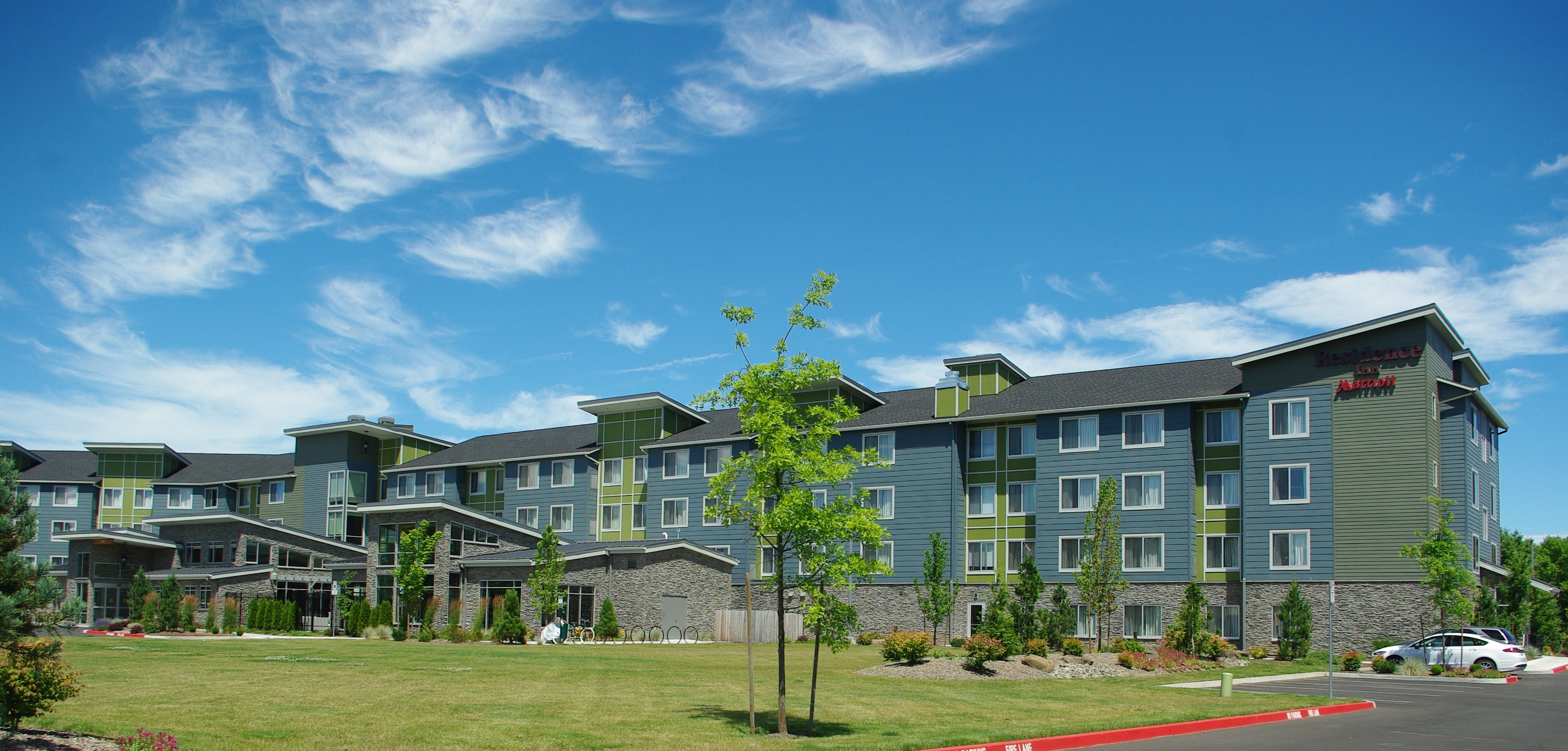
Residence Inn in Hillsboro

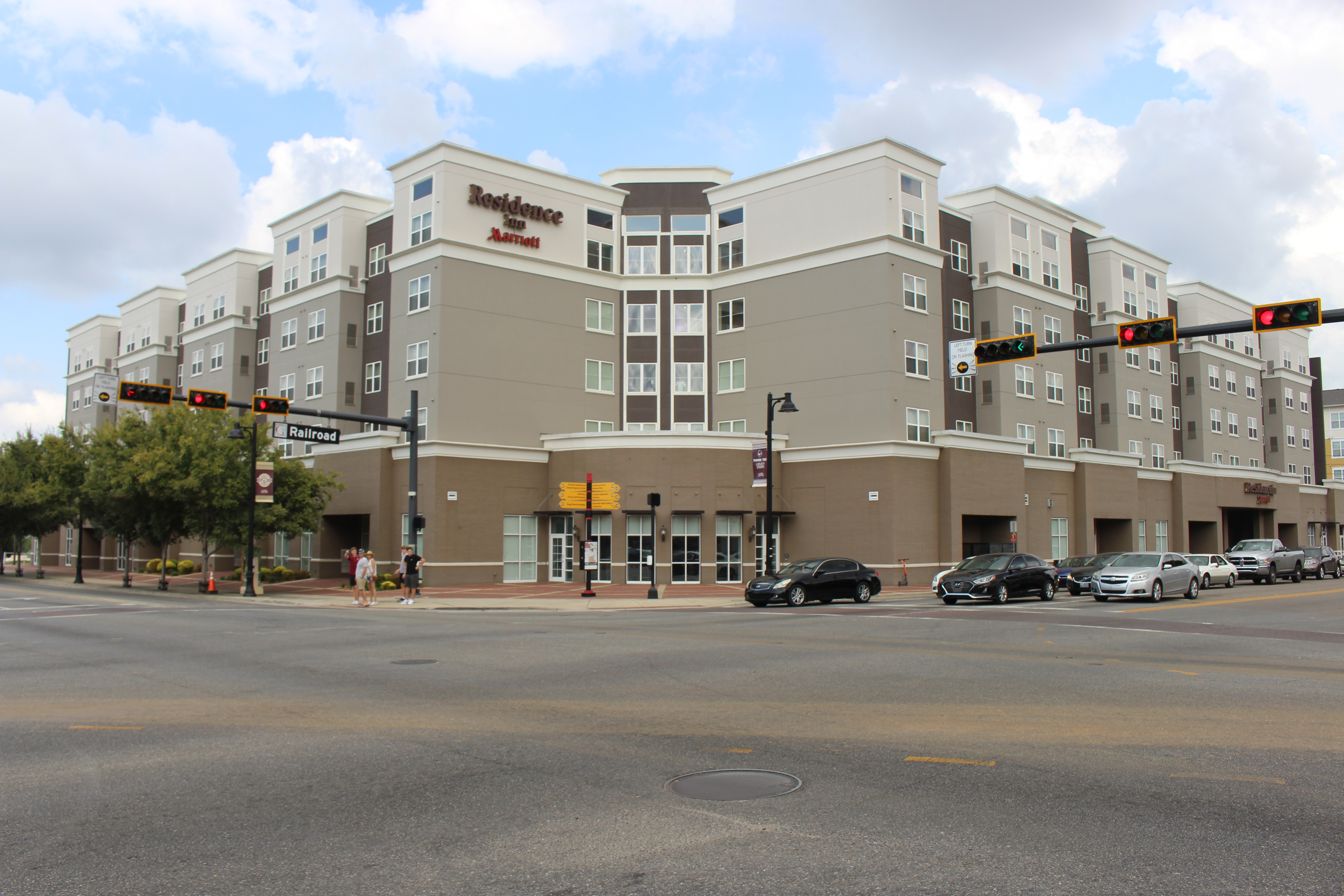
In Tallahassee

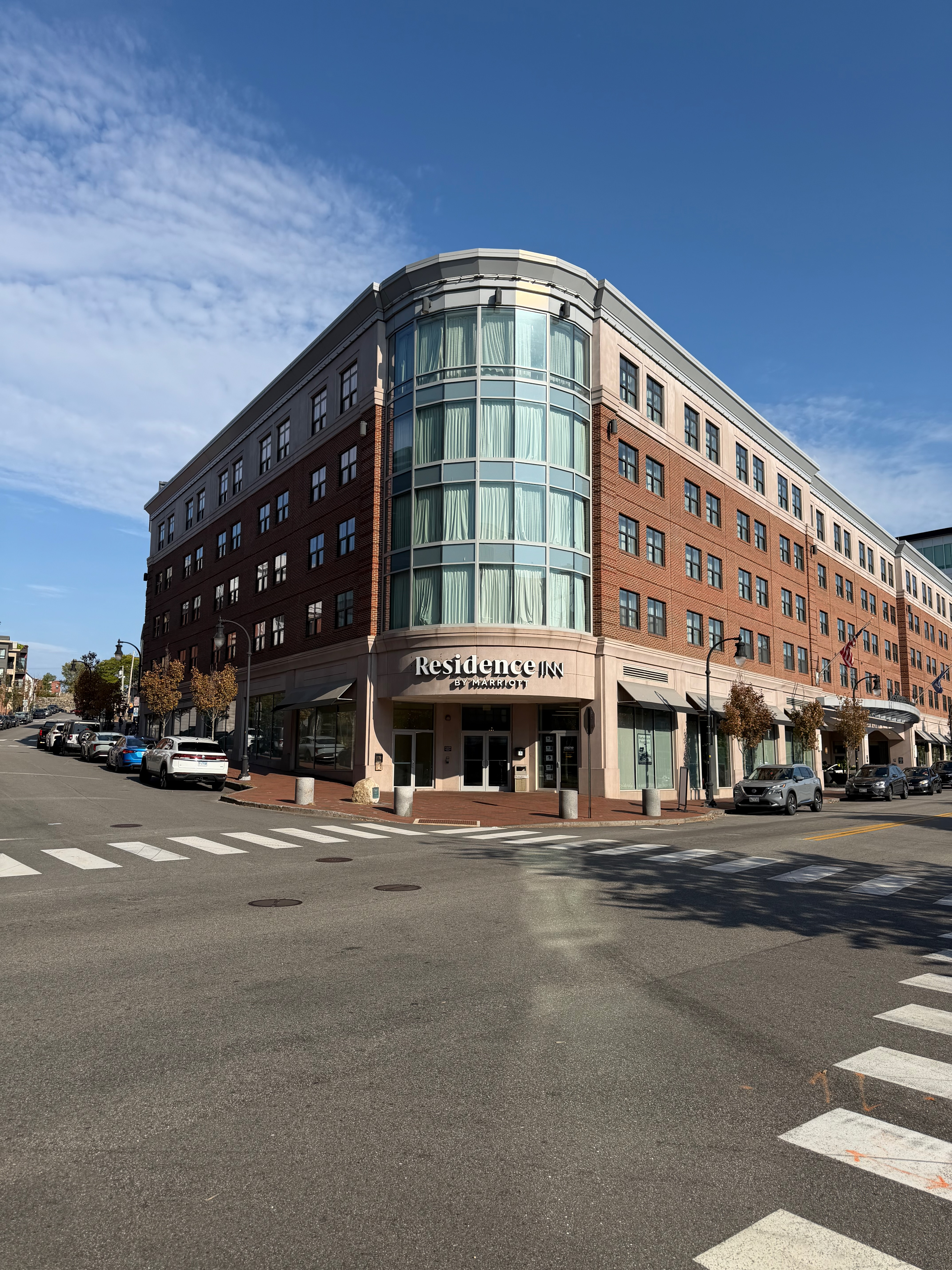
In Portland, Maine

=== Historical ===
		US	Non-US		Total
2007	Properties	528	18		546
2007	Rooms	62,805	2,611		65,416
2008	Properties	555	18		573
2008	Rooms	66,252	2,665		68,917
2009	Properties	591	17		608
2009	Rooms	70,995	2,417		73,412
2010	Properties	595	18		613
2010	Rooms	71,571	2,559		74,130
2011	Properties	597	20		617
2011	Rooms	72,076	2,791		74,867
2012	Properties	602	23		625
2012	Rooms	72,642	3,229		75,871
2013	Properties	629	24	KURAC	653
2013	Rooms	76,056	3,349		79,405
2014	Properties	648	27		675
2014	Rooms	78,518	3,645		82,163

=== From 2015 ===
		North America	Europe	Middle E. & Africa	Asia & Pacific	Caribbean Latin Am.	Total
2015	Properties	690	3	3		1	697
2015	Rooms	84,412	307	301		109	85,129
2016	Properties	726	3	3		2	734
2016	Rooms	89,065	307	301		249	89,922
2017	Properties	750	5	3		2	760
2017	Rooms	92,637	520	301		249	93,707
2018	Properties	789	9	3		2	803
2018	Rooms	97,335	1,196	301		249	99,081
2019	Properties	833	12	3		2	850
2019	Rooms	103,038	1,477	301		249	105,065
2020	Properties	854	13	3		4	874
2020	Rooms	105,273	1,569	294		544	107,680
2021	Properties	846	17	6		7	876
2021	Rooms	104,167	1,975	983		982	108,107
2022	Properties	849	21	7		8	885
2022	Rooms	104,463	2,408	1,117		1,213	109,201
2023	Properties	861	27	7		8	903
2023	Rooms	105,911	3,205	1,117		1,213	111,446
