= The Rock-afire Explosion =

Animatronic character band

Background information
- Origin: Orlando, Florida, United States
- Genres: Rock and roll; pop; country
- Years active: 1980–present
- Labels: Creative Records; Terror Vision
- Spinoffs: New Rock-Afire Explosion; The Mijjins
- Spinoff of: The Wolf Pack 5; The Hard Luck Bears
- Members: Billy Bob Brockali; Looney Bird; Beach Bear; Fatz Geronimo; Dook Larue; Mitzi Mozzarella; Rolfe DeWolfe; Earl Schmerle
- Past members: Uncle Klunk
- Website: engineeringcreative.com

The Rock-afire Explosion (RAE) is an animatronic character band designed and manufactured by Creative Engineering, Inc. (CEI) for use in ShowBiz Pizza Place restaurants in the 1980s and early 1990s. The band's characters are various anthropomorphized animals, including a brown bear, a grey wolf and a silverback gorilla. They perform medleys of classic rock, pop, and country music, as well as original compositions and comedic skits.

CEI was founded by inventor Aaron Fechter, who oversaw production of the animatronics and provided several of the characters' voices. The band was replaced by Chuck E. Cheese characters and renamed Munch's Make Believe Band following ShowBiz Pizza's decision to rebrand in the early 1990s. As relations with ShowBiz deteriorated, CEI began selling The Rock-afire Explosion to other restaurants and entertainment centers around the world, including Circus Pizza, Pistol Pete's Pizza, and Billy Bob's Wonderland.

The show was considered pioneering in the animatronic industry, featuring life-sized characters capable of advanced movement and facial expression. At the end of the show's tenure, former Chuck E. Cheese marketing director Jul Kamen credited Rock-afire with being largely responsible for ShowBiz’s early financial success.

== Production ==
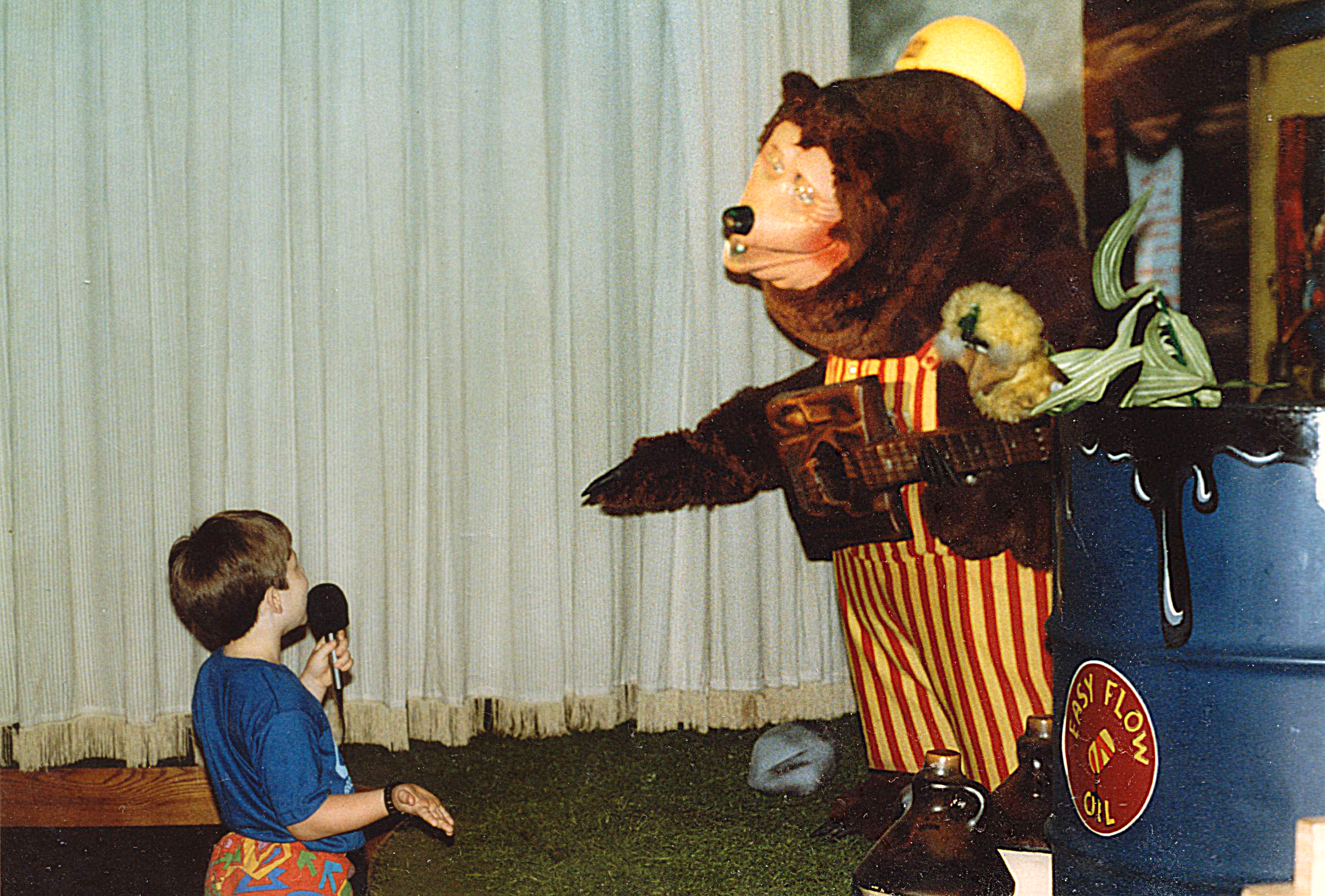
A child uses a microphone to speak with Billy Bob at the ShowBiz Pizza location in Fayetteville, Arkansas.

Production of the show's programming and audio was done in-house by Creative Engineering, Inc. (CEI) in Orlando, Florida. Nearly all Rock-afire shows were produced completely in-house, with CEI employees writing and performing songs and comedic skits. When ShowBiz began assuming control over programming, they used Songcode, a system inherited from their acquisition of Chuck E. Cheese (CEC).

=== Technical specifications ===
The Rock-afire Explosion uses four recorded tracks, two for audio and two for data. Collections of programmed audio, referred to as "showtapes", were originally distributed on reel-to-reel. Stages run on modern computers play shows from .wma audio files. The data tracks are encoded using Biphase mark code produced during a programming process involving two Apple IIe computers, and decoded using a computer known as the "Grey Box". The audio tracks contain a stereo mix encoded with dbx Type I noise reduction. The circuitry of the RAE was originally purchased by CEI from Superscope, the makers of Pianocorder.

== Band members ==
=== The Rock-afire Explosion ===
- Fatz Geronimo – keyboards, vocals

He is a silverback gorilla from New Orleans. He is a parody of real-life entertainers Fats Domino and Ray Charles. Unofficial band frontman, Fatz has a tendency to ramble. He introduces the most shows and orders other band members around, leading him and Rolfe DeWolfe into many arguments. Preceded by Fats from the Wolf Pack Five. Voice – Burt Wilson (1980–2006, 2020-2023), Aaron Fechter (2006–2020), Shooter Jennings (2024-present)

- Beach Bear – guitar, vocals

He is a wisecracking surfer “solar bear” with a laid-back attitude, who often keeps the peace along with Billy Bob. When voiced by Fechter, he was less intelligent and more frantic. Beach Bear was carried over from the Wolf Pack Five. Voice – Aaron Fechter (1980–1982), Rick Bailey (1982–present)

- Dook LaRue – drums, vocals

He is a mongrel from New Orleans with a smooth singing voice. He aspires to be an astronaut, and wears a homemade space themed suit. Slightly dimwitted, Dook often loses focus during shows and misses his cues. Preceded by Dingo Star from the Wolf Pack Five. Voice – Duke Chauppetta (1980–1997, 2016-2021), Brandon Shepherd (2025-present)

- Mitzi Mozzarella – vocals

She is a mouse and a cheerleader. A conventional teenager, Mitzi is considered "loose" by the rest of the Rock-afire Explosion, and is obsessed with gossip, boyfriends, pop music, and Michael Jackson. Preceded by Queenie Fox and Mini Mozzarella from the Wolf Pack Five. Voice – Aaron Fechter (1980–1982), Monique Danielle (1982), Shalisa James (1982–present)

=== Stage Left ===
- Billy Bob Brockali – bass (sometimes a guitar), vocals

He is a brown bear from Tennessee who wears yellow and red overalls and plays a wooden bass. His stage is themed as a service station, called Smitty's Super Service Station. Sweet and well-liked, Billy Bob is usually a mediator to the band's minor on-stage squabbles. He was the mascot for ShowBiz Pizza Place throughout its existence, and his image was on most of the chain's merchandise. Preceded by Billy Wilbur from the Hard Luck Bears and Chet Faddikins from the Bear Country Jubilee. Voice – Aaron Fechter

- Looney Bird – occasional vocals

He is a red tropical bird. Created as Billy Bob's unintelligent sidekick, he was originally addicted to the alcoholic gasoline sold at Smitty's. In the late 1980s, his personality would undergo a drastic change and he would be portrayed as an inventor and scientific genius; he also became a more prominently featured character. Currently, his personality is neutral. Only Looney Bird's head is seen, as he raises and lowers from an oil drum. Some shows featured a segment where Looney Bird would answer fan mail. For this, the robot was retrofitted to include a pair of hands that held a piece of paper for him to read. Preceded by Gooney Bird from the Hard Luck Bears. Voice – Aaron Fechter

=== Stage Right ===
- Rolfe DeWolfe and Earl Schmerle –

A ventriloquist act. Originally intended to be a stand-up comedy act performed in between musical sets, they soon became regularly featured alongside the band as vocalists. Rolfe is a wolf, and Earl is his sentient ventriloquist puppet. Rolfe, who rarely sings, is portrayed as arrogant with a tendency to be incredibly rude to both the band and the employees that work at Showbiz. He has a fondness for disco music, and the works of Frank Sinatra. Earl serves to balance out Rolfe, putting him down and calling him out frequently. Rolfe was preceded by the Wolfman from the Wolf Pack Five, while Earl is an original character. Voice – Aaron Fechter (for both Rolfe and Earl)

=== Other characters ===
The show also consists of several smaller prop characters, many of which do not have speaking roles. These include an animated Sun and Moon that provide background vocals, a birthday-themed spider named Antioch who speaks in gibberish, and a bear cub known as Choo-Choo, who hides in a small tree stump in front of Dook's drums and dances to the band's music. One of the more notable prop characters is Birthday Bird, who is perched on the neck of Billy Bob's guitar.

Additionally, Uncle Klunk, a human character based on CEI employee Jeff Howell (who voiced him originally), was created to replace Rolfe & Earl at different Showbiz locations across the country on an occasional basis. Forty animatronic Klunk characters were produced and traveled to different stores in the mid 1980s. Klunk is the host of The Uncle Klunk Abomination, and his segments consist of him taking calls with his bird sidekick, Click. The Klunk animatronics also served to be retrofitted into Santa Claus during the holidays.

== Later years ==
=== Concept Unification ===
ShowBiz Pizza Place was similar to (and competed with) Chuck E. Cheese's Pizza Time Theatre, another animatronic restaurant chain that was popular in the United States. In the mid-1980s, both venues began to suffer financial difficulties, partially due to the video game crash of 1983 and also due to both companies having opened more restaurants than they could afford to maintain. When Pizza Time Theatre filed for bankruptcy in 1984, ShowBiz bought the company, hoping that new talent and merchandising opportunities could save both companies.

By 1985, Richard M. Frank had joined the company as CEO and chairman. The corporation maintained the two restaurant chains simultaneously for several years. Each continued its own stage shows and sold different merchandise. However, in the latter part of the decade, relations between Creative Engineering and ShowBiz began to sour. Aaron Fechter, the founder of Creative Engineering and creator of the Rock-afire Explosion, claimed that the fallout between his company and ShowBiz arose when ShowBiz asked him to sign away the licensing and copyrights to the Rock-afire Explosion, which would have allowed ShowBiz to cut production costs on the show, such as manufacture of future shows and royalty payments to Creative Engineering. Fechter refused, on the grounds that ShowBiz offered no monetary compensation for the rights.

ShowBiz began toying with the idea of adding licensed characters such as Spider-Man or Garfield to the Rock-afire show, and three ShowBiz locations actually replaced Billy Bob and Looney Bird with Yogi Bear and Boo Boo animatronics in 1987. Ideas to retrofit the Rock-afire into completely original characters were also proposed at the time by Creative Presentations Inc, a now-defunct animatronic company based in Schaumburg, Illinois, that already provided ShowBiz with new showtapes and replacement cosmetics for Rock-afire shows.

Using JVC-BR-7000 tape decks, ShowBiz engineers Paul Linden and Dave Philipsen developed a new show format in 1988, known as Cyberstar. The technology integrated two stereo audio tracks, two longitudinal show data tracks, and video. Television screens were installed alongside Rock-afire shows as the company introduced the new system. During showtime, the characters, as well as their walkaround counterparts, were finally shown performing in video, as reel-to-reel formatted tapes began to be used less often at ShowBiz stores. Cyberstar was also implemented at Pizza Time Theatre, and remained in use at all Chuck E. Cheese's locations until 2022.

A reel-to-reel version of Cyberstar, "Cybervision", was tested at two restaurants in Austin, TX, with the video only featuring animatronic characters.

The changes to the Rock-afire stage were very minor, as the company later decided to enact a process called "Concept Unification," in which all ShowBiz Pizza locations would be remodeled into Chuck E. Cheese's. The remodel included the elimination of all Rock-afire characters from merchandise and advertising, and retrofitting/reprogramming the Rock-afire Explosion animatronics into a show called Munch's Make Believe Band, featuring the Chuck E. Cheese's Pizza Time Theatre characters. Dook was moved to Billy Bob's place and became Pasqually P. Pieplate, Looney Bird became Pizzacam, Beach Bear became Jasper T. Jowls, Fatz became Mr. Munch, Mitzi was moved to Dook's place and became Helen Henny, The Sun became The Building, Choo-Choo became Munch Junior, and Rolfe became Chuck E. Cheese; The Moon was the only character carried over unchanged, and Antioch's computer and air lines were reused for The Wink, an animated Chuck E. Cheese head over the stage that would wink at the end of each segment. Unused animatronics (which included Billy Bob, Earl, and Antioch) and props were either sold off, used for parts or destroyed.

After ties between Creative Engineering and ShowBiz were completely severed, "Concept Unification" was announced in 1990 and locations were gradually converted throughout the early 1990s. As Concept Unification began at each location, the right and center stages of the Rock-afire show were shut down, leaving only the Rolfe and Earl characters operational. The two performed "The Rolfe and Earle Show" (Earl's name was unintentionally misspelled), featuring the voices of Showbiz employees imitating Fechter's voice; the two ran a highlight reel of old Rock-afire Cyberstar segments and wondered aloud what the band would do now, and hinted at the coming Chuck E. Cheese-themed show. "The Rolfe and Earle Show" was the final Rock-afire show produced for Showbiz.

=== Post-Showbiz Pizza ===
As troubles began between CEI and Showbiz, the RAE was marketed to other restaurants and amusement parks around the world. In the 1990s, an update to the band, known as "The New Rock-afire Explosion", was created, using new, smaller animatronics known as "mijjins", as well as other features such as revolving stages and dance choreography. However, relatively few customers purchased the show.

Odyssey Fun World, an indoor amusement park located in Naperville, Illinois, and Tinley Park, Illinois, operated the New Rock-afire show in its restaurants.

Fechter terminated all of his employees over several years through 2003. In the mid 2000s, spurred by the growing online Rock-afire fan community, Fechter reunited some of the Rock-afire performers and began to program shows set to fan-requested songs. Videos of the performances—posted to his YouTube upon completion—are credited with helping to further revive interest in the group and ShowBiz Pizza, and spurred individuals who owned their own Rock-afire bands to begin programming new shows themselves.

The band and its setting inspired the 2010s video game horror series Five Nights at Freddy's, in which the player is a pizza restaurant security guard monitoring rogue animatronic characters.

== Surviving Shows ==
=== Independent shows in the United States ===
A Rock-afire Explosion show operates publicly at Billy Bob's Wonderland in Barboursville, West Virginia, a former Showbiz Pizza restaurant which went independent after the merger with CEC. The show was restored in 2021 after decades of disrepair. The location is also the site of BillyCon, an annual fan convention for The Rock-afire Explosion and Showbiz Pizza.

The Volo Museum received a Rock-afire Explosion show slated for installation in 2020, however licensing issues with Aaron Fechter prevented it from operating publicly. However, as of 2024, Volo Museum and Fechter came to an agreement and the show is now operational.

Aaron Fechter maintains his own Rock-afire show, which has been used to program new shows and perform for private guests.

Animatronics Warehouse, run by Jack Turner, is located in St. Joseph, Missouri and features a fully functioning restored Rock-afire Explosion. The show is available for private tours.

Smitty's Super Service Station, a private museum in Sandy Hook, Mississippi, maintains a fully functional show.

John Zerwas purchased a Rock-afire Explosion from Chimpy's Pizza Safari, a restaurant, in 2005. His show is installed in his home in Minnesota.

David Ferguson of Pendleton, Indiana, has a Rock-afire installed in his barn, dubbed "Goofy Gas Fillin' Station".

Billy Bob's Bear-A-Dice Tropical Jamboree is a travelling Rock-afire show with four characters. It makes occasional appearances at various state and county fairs.

=== Independent public shows internationally ===
The Dreamfactory & World of Wonders in Degersheim, Switzerland has had a show since 1987, however it only became operational in 2021. This show features a turntable that swaps between Rolfe's stage and Uncle Klunk. It can be visited during the museum's operating hours. As of 2025, the show is in a state of disrepair.

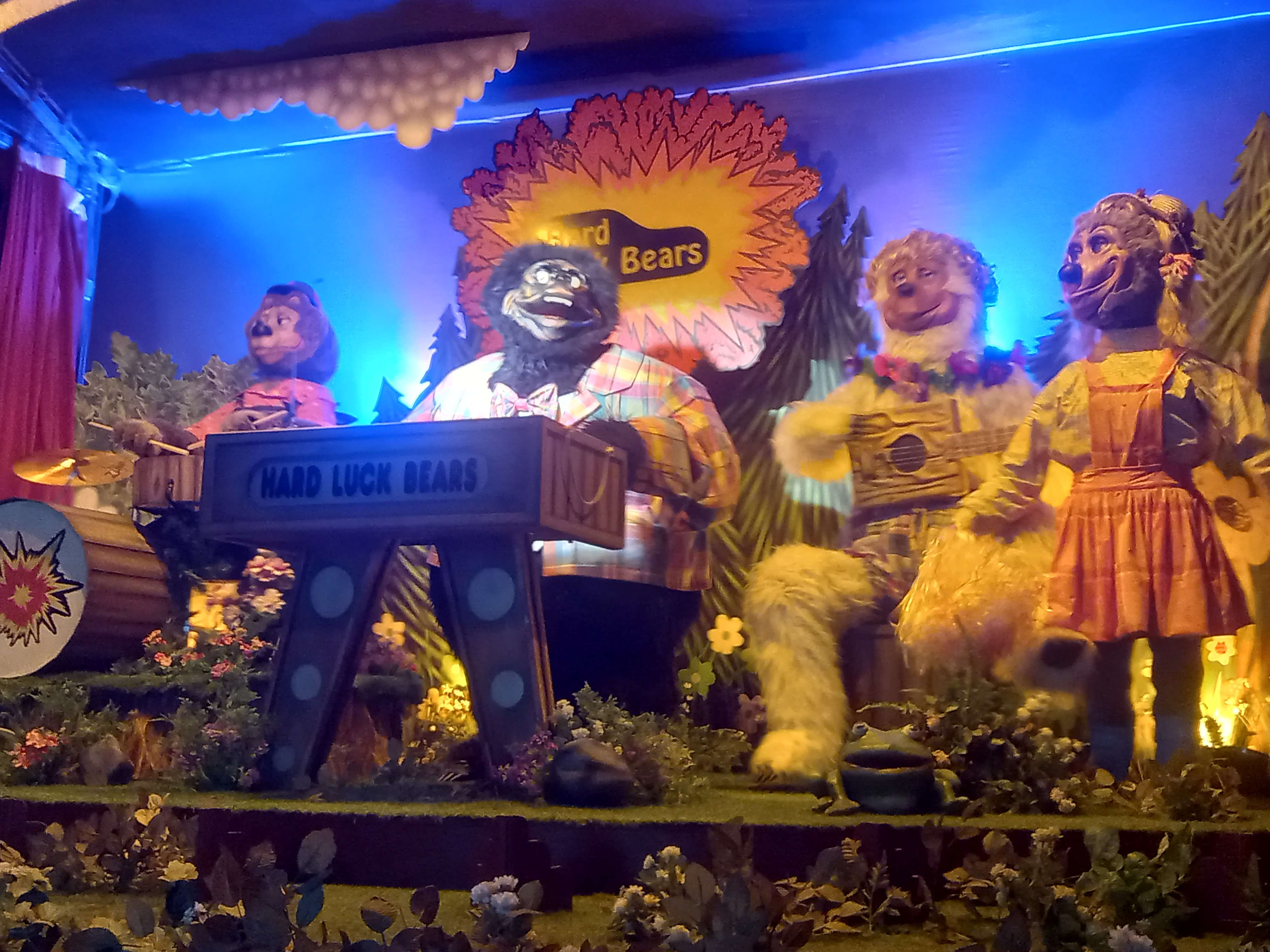
The Rock-afire Explosion (under The Hard Luck Bears) performing at Gulliver's Kingdom in Matlock Bath, Derbyshire

The Hard Luck Bears Jamboree is a retrofitted Rock-afire Explosion show located in the Gulliver's World, Gulliver's Land, and Gulliver's Kingdom theme parks. All characters with the exception of Looney Bird and Earl are bears, but retain their original names. The show has been criticized for its programming, voice acting, and poor condition as a result of Gulliver's standards. As of 2025, however, the shows are being restored and programmed to original Rock-afire showtapes.

== Documentary ==
The Rock-afire Explosion, a documentary about Chris Thrash, Aaron Fechter and the remaining Rock-afire Explosion fan base, was released at film festivals and special screenings around the United States starting on September 27, 2008. It was released on DVD on September 29, 2009. In 2011, it was released on iTunes. On May 14, 2015, a Kickstarter tier for the film A Life in Waves, which was directed by the same team as the documentary, featured a limited 75 copies on VHS. On February 1, 2024, the film was released on Blu-ray by the American Genre Film Archive with a limited 2,000 copies.

== Discography ==
=== Studio albums ===
Year	Title	Label	Notes
1982	Gee, Our 1st Album	Creative Records	Released on LP and cassette.
1987	Homely For Christmas	Creative Records	Last release for ShowBiz Pizza restaurants.
2025	Original Dreams: Songs From ShowBiz	Terror Vision	Released for Record Store Day on April 11, 2025 with 1,200 copies. Later releases for cassette and CD would have 200 and 500 copies produced respectively.

=== Singles ===
Year	Title	Label	Notes
1981	Do You Love Me / Happy Birthday Medley	Creative Records	Copies given away for free at birthday parties at ShowBiz Pizza Place. Repressed in 1983.
1981	Beatles Medley / Roast Beef Sandwich	Creative Records	Beatles Medley includes "Eight Days a Week," "You Can't Do That," "All My Loving," and "I Saw Her Standing There."
1981	Heartaches / Birthday	Creative Records	Copies given away for free at birthday parties at ShowBiz Pizza Place. Repressed in 1983.
1981	School Days / Catch a Wave	Creative Records	
1981	Banana Hill / Mr. Bass Man	Creative Records	
1982	Disco Christmas / In December / If Every Day Were Like Christmas	Creative Records	33 ⅓ RPM single containing two songs on the B-side.
1983	Strain Your Brain / Born to Run	Creative Records	Released to coincide with the Crazy Colander Head Night event at ShowBiz Pizza Place.
1983	Beatles White Album Medley	Creative Records	
1983	Monkees Medley	Creative Records	
1983	End of the World / I Will / Don't Hang Up	Creative Records	
1983	Don't Let Go / Travelin' Man	Creative Records	
1983	One on One / 867-5309/Jenny	Creative Records	
1984	Michael Jackson Medley	Creative Records	
2026	Fun! Fun! Fun! - The Volo Show	Creative Records	12-inch 33 ⅓ RPM record made exclusively for Volo Museum.
