= Walter Hough =

American ethnologist

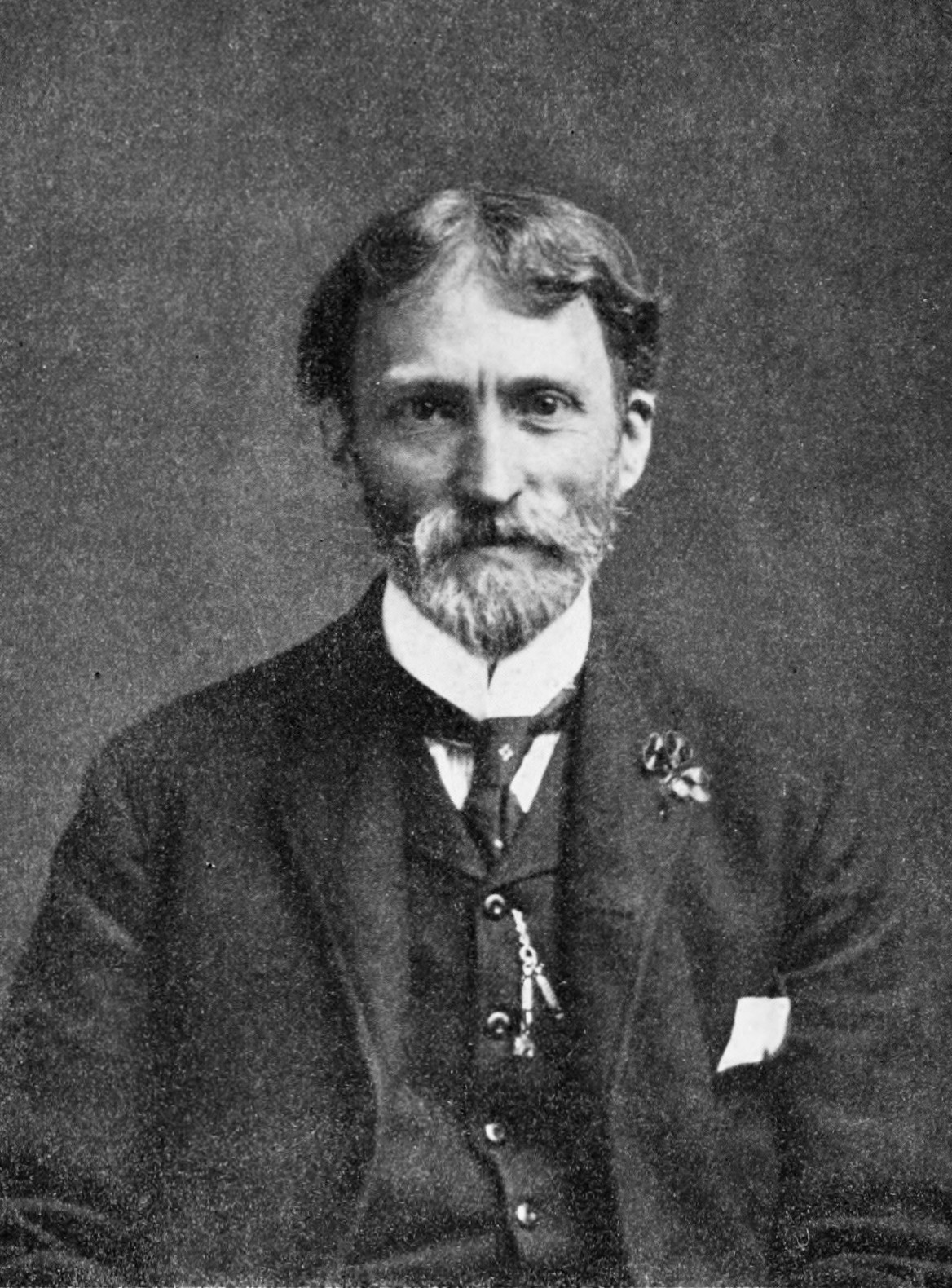
- Walter Hough in 1904
- Born: 1859; Morgantown, Virginia, United States
- Died: 1935, aged approximately 76
- Education: West Virginia Agricultural College, West Virginia University
- Awards: Order of Isabella
- Scientific career
- Fields: Ethnography, archaeology
- Workplaces: Smithsonian Institution

Walter Hough (/ˈhʌf/ HUF), Ph.D. (April 23, 1859–1935) was an American ethnologist who worked for the Smithsonian Institution.

== Life ==
Hough was born at Morgantown, Virginia. He was educated at Monongalia Academy, West Virginia Agricultural College, and West Virginia University (A.B., 1883; Ph.D., 1894). He was employed at the Smithsonian National Museum of Natural History as an assistant (1886–1894), as assistant curator of ethnology (1896–1910), and as curator from 1910 until his death in 1935.

In 1892, Hough was made Knight of the Real Orden de Isabel la Católica when in Madrid as a member of the United States Commission. He was also a member of Dr. J. Walter Fewkes' expedition to Arizona (1896–1897).

Though Hough's work revolved around cataloging the museum's collections, he also spent time doing archaeological field work in the American Southwest.

In 1905, Hough unearthed preserved cobs of maize in a cave in New Mexico that helped subsequent archaeologists determine that the Mogollon ethnic group inhabited the area before the Anasazi Puebloans, who were previously considered to be the area's earliest inhabitants.

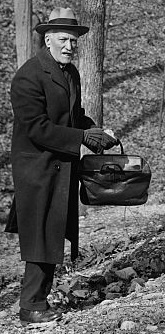
Hough in Rock Creek Park, 1926

== Publications ==
- "Censers and incense of Mexico and Central America"—full online copy at HathiTrust

== Family ==
Hough married Myrtle Zuck, a botanical collector, of Holbrook, Arizona on the 29 December 29, 1897.
