= MISSY =

Research database

The Microdata Information System (MISSY) is a database-driven online system, that provides structured metadata about selected research data of official statistics free of charge as part of the service infrastructure of the German Microdata Lab (GML) at GESIS – Leibniz Institute for the Social Sciences. MISSY is targeted at empirically-working scientists who use official microdata for their research.

== Documented data ==
Metadata for the following microdata are provided and regularly updated in MISSY:

- German Microcensus (MZ)
- European Union Statistics on Income and Living Conditions (EU-SILC)
- European Union Labour Force Survey (EU-LFS)

All documentation in MISSY refers to microdata available for scientific purposes (Scientific Use Files).

== Coverage ==
The metadata offered in MISSY includes aspects of information relevant for an analysis of the data collected in the respective surveys.

The MISSY metadata schema is based on the recommendations of the international documentation standard of the Data Documentation Initiative (DDI) and work by GML. In MISSY, the research-relevant metadata on official microdata are digitally prepared and available via a database, from where they may be automatically exported to statistical software or social science classification systems. The system supports comparisons between survey years, countries, and research-relevant variables. MISSY data adheres to FAIR criteria (findable, accessible, interoperable, and reusable) standards.
