= Love Classics =

1949 Marvel comic series

Love Classics was a Marvel comic series, published in 1949.
