= ShowBiz Pizza Place =

Defunct arcade/restaurant pizza chain

- Original logo first used in 1980

- Second logo first used in 1987
- Type: Public
- Traded as: Nasdaq: SHBZ
- Industry: Pizzeria; Restaurant; Family entertainment center; Franchising
- Founded: March 3, 1980; 46 years ago, in Kansas City, Missouri, United States
- Founder: Robert L. Brock; Aaron Fechter
- Defunct: 1993 or 1994 (Note: Conversions began in 1990 and were known to occur until at least 1994. The date of the final store conversion is not known.)
- Fate: Merged into Chuck E. Cheese
- Successor: Chuck E. Cheese
- Headquarters: Irving, Texas, U.S.
- Area served: Contiguous United States; Hawaii; Mexico; Guatemala
- Products: Pizza
- Owner: Brock Hotel Corporation (1980–1988)
- Parent: ShowBiz Pizza Place, Inc. (1980–1985); ShowBiz Pizza Time, Inc. (1985–1994)

ShowBiz Pizza Place, or ShowBiz Pizza for short, was an American family entertainment center and pizza chain founded in 1980 by Robert L. Brock and Aaron Fechter of Creative Engineering (CEI). It emerged after a separation between Brock and owners of the Chuck E. Cheese franchise, Pizza Time Theatre. ShowBiz Pizza restaurants entertained guests through a large selection of arcade games, coin-operated rides, and animatronic stage shows.

The two companies became competitors and found early success, partly due to the rise in popularity of arcade games during the late 1970s and early 1980s. The type of animatronics used in the ShowBiz Pizza chain distinguished it from its rival, which offered many of the same services. When Pizza Time Theatre declared bankruptcy in 1984, ShowBiz merged with the struggling franchise to settle a former court settlement mandate, forming ShowBiz Pizza Time. Following a severing of ties with CEI in 1990, most ShowBiz Pizza locations were rebranded as Chuck E. Cheese locations, which took several years to complete.

== History ==
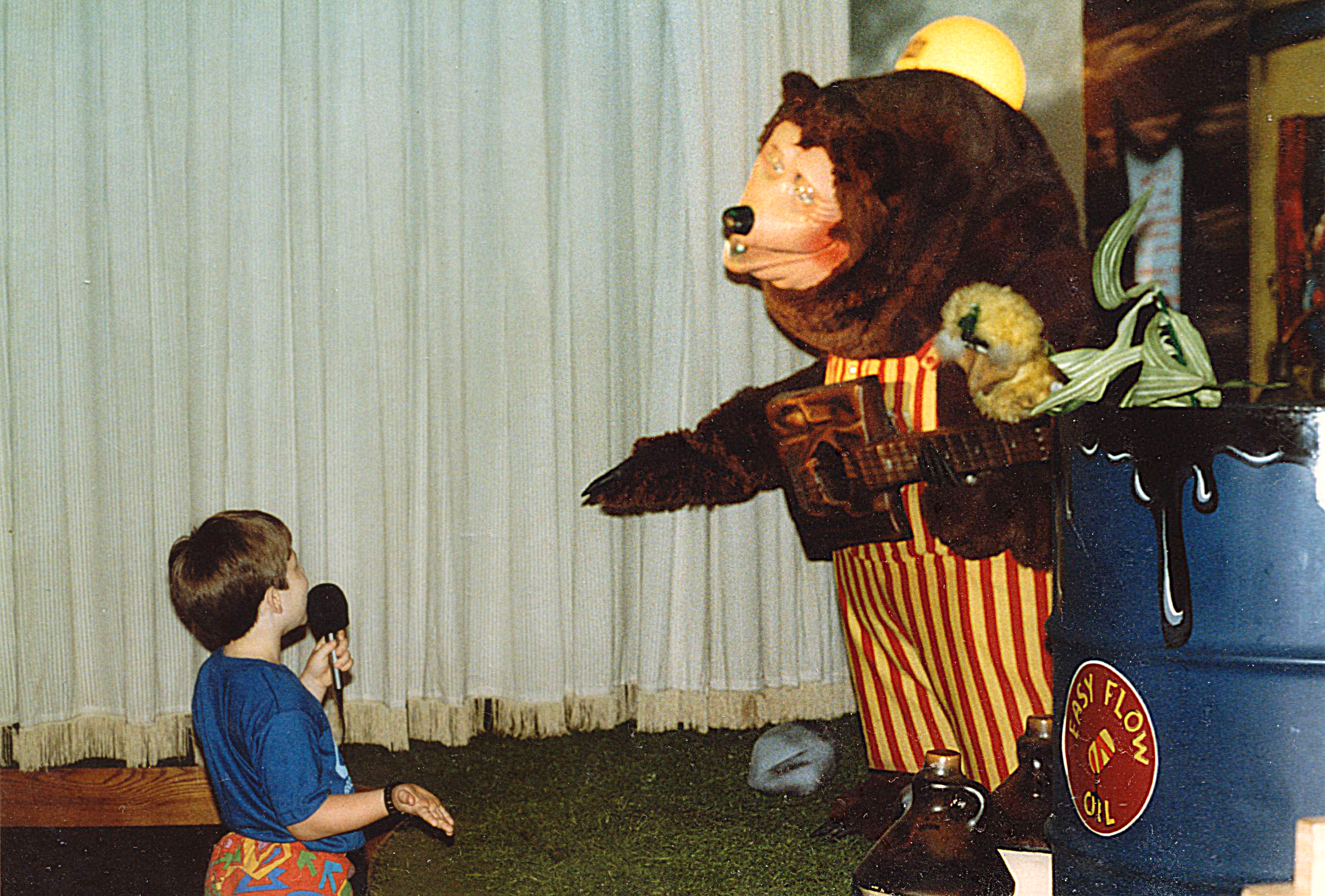
A child speaking with Billy Bob at ShowBiz Pizza in Fayetteville, Arkansas

Atari co-founder Nolan Bushnell, responsible for creating the first widely recognized video game, Pong, headed a project in the mid-1970s for Atari to launch the first arcade-oriented, family restaurant with computer-programmed animatronics. At a time when arcades were popular in bowling alleys and bars, Bushnell sought to expose younger audiences to arcade games. In May 1977, Atari opened the first Chuck E. Cheese's Pizza Time Theatre in San Jose, California. The concept was an immediate success, and Bushnell purchased the Pizza Time restaurant from Atari for $500,000 in 1978, stepping down as chairman and forming Pizza Time Theatre Inc.

As Bushnell marketed the franchise, hoping to expand into new markets, the concept attracted high-profile clients such as Robert L. Brock, known for his extensive portfolio of Holiday Inn hotels. In June 1979, Brock signed a multi-million-dollar franchising agreement with Pizza Time Theatre Inc., planning to open as many as 285 Chuck E. Cheese's locations across 16 states. Shortly thereafter, Brock noticed that companies such as Creative Engineering, Inc. (CEI) were designing more advanced animatronics, and he became concerned that competitors would emerge with better technology. Bushnell had reassured Brock at the signing of the franchising agreement that the company's technology would continue to evolve. However in November, prior to the opening of his first location, Brock decided to void the agreement with Pizza Time and enter a partnership with CEI, forming ShowBiz Pizza Place, Inc., in December 1979.

The Brock Hotel Corporation assumed 80% control of the company, while the remaining 20% stake went to Creative Engineering. CEI produced the chain's animatronics show, The Rock-afire Explosion. The first ShowBiz Pizza Place location opened to the public in Kansas City, Missouri, on March 3, 1980. By September 1981, there were 48 company-owned outlets and 42 franchises. The company's headquarters was moved the following year to Irving, Texas.

=== ShowBiz Pizza Time, Inc. ===
Showbiz Pizza's primary rival, Pizza Time Theatre, filed for Chapter 11 bankruptcy in 1984. Its assets, including the Chuck E. Cheese's restaurant chain, were purchased by Brock Hotel Corporation in May 1985. The two pizza restaurant subsidiaries merged, forming ShowBiz Pizza Time, Inc. – a combination of the two previous company names. Following the merger, both restaurant chains continued to operate as separate entities.

Richard M. Frank joined the company as president and chief operating officer in 1985. In 1986, he was named chairman and chief executive officer of the restaurant division. Based on customer research, Frank instituted a number of changes to appeal to younger children and parents. Specific measures included increased lighting, a redesigned food menu, table service, self-serve fountain drinks, a revamped ride selection, and distinct toddler areas, but relations between ShowBiz and Creative Engineering began to deteriorate. Aaron Fechter, founder of CEI and creator of The Rock-afire Explosion, claimed in 2008 that the fallout was due to a demand by Showbiz to own CEI's licensing and copyrights to the animatronics show. Fechter says he refused, since Showbiz did not offer monetary compensation for the rights. Despite the refusal, CEI's creative control was jeopardized, as ShowBiz had the ability to program the characters and replicate their voices, allowing them to make changes to the skits. ShowBiz later returned the recording rights to Fechter following CEI's Liberty Show production (in commemoration of the Statue of Liberty's centennial in 1986), but they did not return the programming rights.

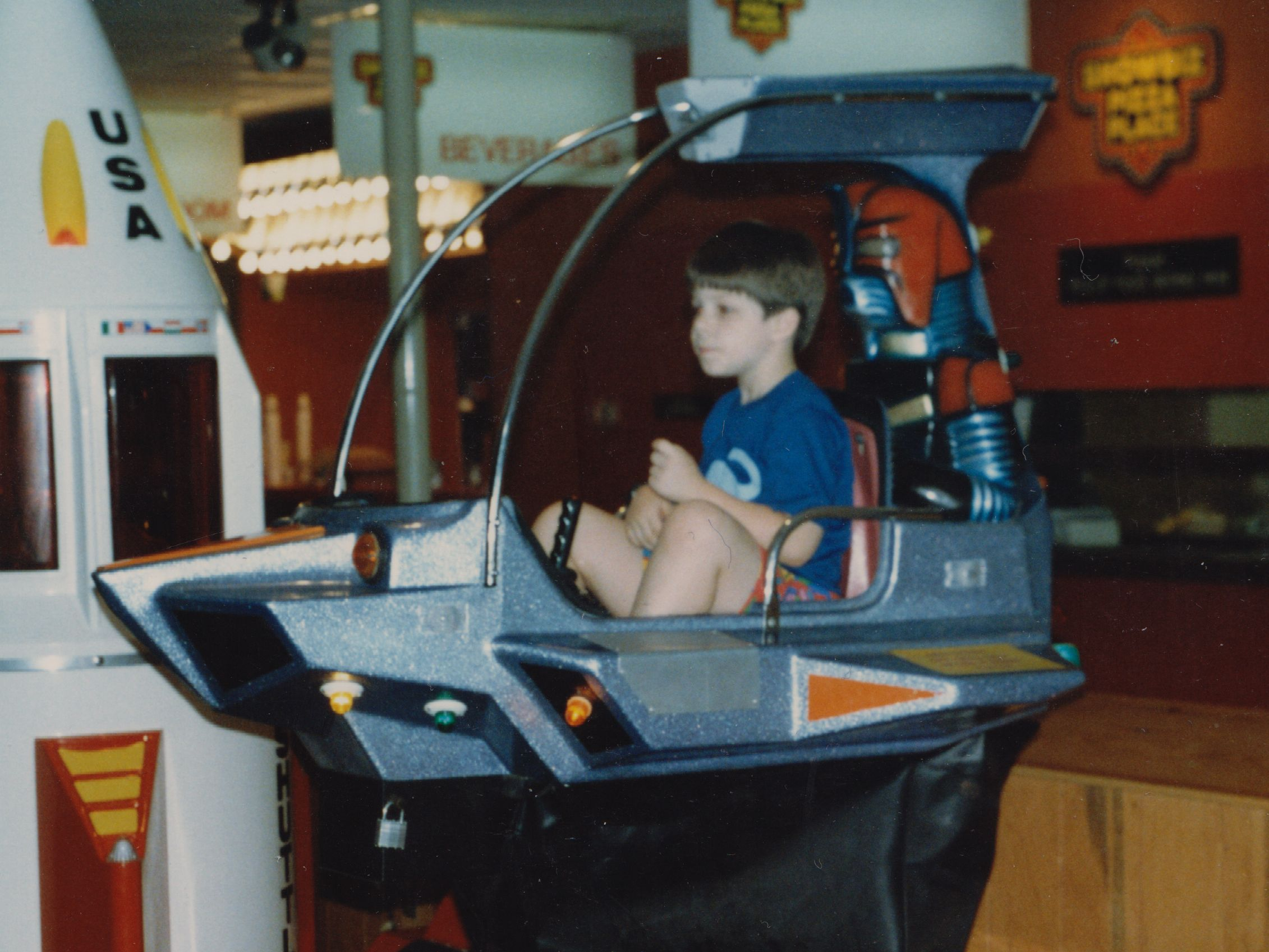
The same child interviewed by Billy Bob on a ride at ShowBiz Pizza in Fayetteville, Arkansas

In 1989, ShowBiz Pizza Time became a public company with its stock market launch. The following year, it severed all ties with CEI and began restructuring the restaurant chains under "Concept Unification". The change consisted of removing the Rock-afire Explosion animatronic show from their restaurants and converting it into a new show called "Chuck E. Cheese & Munch's Make Believe Band", featuring characters from Chuck E. Cheese's Pizza Time Theatre. Over the course of several years, ShowBiz Pizza locations were rebranded as Chuck E. Cheese's, effectively ending the "ShowBiz Pizza" brand within the restaurant storefront.

In February 2014, the company was purchased by Apollo Global Management for $1.3 billion. In December 2020, the company was sold to Monarch Alternative Capital after it emerged from its June bankruptcy that same year, and CEC Entertainment, Inc. was renamed to CEC Entertainment, LLC.

== See also ==
- Billy Bob's Wonderland, one of the last places that still feature The Rock-afire Explosion animatronic band also featured at Showbiz
- List of pizza chains of the United States
