= International Adult and Continuing Education Hall of Fame =

Coordinates: 35.1987°N 97.4443°W

The International Adult and Continuing Education Hall of Fame (IACEHOF) was founded in 1996 "to honor leaders in the fields of continuing education and adult learning and to serve as a record and inspiration for the next generation of continuing education leaders". Annually, around ten adult and continuing education leaders from around the world are selected for induction into the IACE Hall of Fame.

Logo of the society:

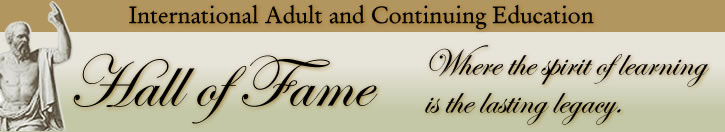

== History ==
The history of the International Adult and Continuing Education Hall of Fame officially began in the early 1990s with the desire to honor and document contributions of the past to better build the future. Dr. Thurman J. White, a pioneer in the field of continuing education for adult and nontraditional students, contributor to the theoretical base of adult education and initiator of the Oklahoma College of Continuing Education at University of Oklahoma, initiated this idea in cooperation with current leaders and officers of several associations and organizations in the USA (University Continuing Education Association, American Society for Training and Development, AAACE/American Association of Adult and Continuing Education, ECOP/National Association of State Universities and Land Grant Colleges).

The Hall was incorporated in the state of Oklahoma on September 20, 1995, as a nonprofit corporation. The Hall of Fame, in the beginning focused mostly to the USA, more and more inducted members from other countries. In 2006 the first induction ceremony took place out of the USA in Bamberg, Germany.

After several international meetings, in 2016 a subgroup formed in Europe the Adult and Continuing Education Hall of Fame, European Chapter.

== Structure ==
The Hall of Fame operates with a small central staff in the Office of the Vice President for Outreach at the University of Oklahoma. Inducted members elect a Board of Directors, which manages the induction process and organizes symposia and other Hall activities.

== Hall of Fame Members ==
Scholars, practitioners, and policy makers reflect the diversity of adult and continuing education practice and scholarship and the increasingly global leadership community that constitutes the IACE Hall of Fame. Anyone may nominate a candidate for induction into the International Adult and Continuing Education Hall of Fame. A Nominating Committee reviews nominations and makes recommendations to the Board of Directors, which selects the final group to be inducted every year. The Nomination Instructions claim: "To be eligible for induction into the Hall of Fame, a person must be eminently distinguished in the profession, shall have brought honor or distinction, and shall have contributed to the heritage of adult and continuing education."

Since the first induction in 1996, the Hall of Fame has inducted 404 members with 293 living members (2022).

== Location ==
The official home for the International Adult and Continuing Education Hall of Fame is the University of Oklahoma's Oklahoma Center for Continuing Education (OCCE), Norman, Oklahoma.

== Meetings ==
The IACE Hall of Fame typically holds its annual induction ceremony and symposium in conjunction with the annual conference of a major national/international professional association in the field: for example, in 2008 in Budapest, Hungary in conjunction with the UNESCO/CONFINTEA-conference, in 2010 in Guadalajara with CREAD/Inter-American Distance Education Consortium, and 2011 in Toronto with UPCEA/University Professional & Continuing Education Association. In 2012, twelve adult and continuing education leaders from around the world were inducted in Reno, Nevada; the induction was in conjunction with the National Council for Continuing Education and Training (NCCET) Conference. In 2013, the induction took place in conjunction with the 19th Annual Sloan Consortium International Conference in Lake Buena Vista, Florida. In 2014, adult and continuing education leaders from around the world were inducted into the International Adult and Continuing Education Hall of Fame in Iasi, Romania, in conjunction with The Fourth International Conference on Adult Education in Universities — Local and Regional Perspectives.

The induction for the class of 2015 was held at the annual conference of the American Association for Adult and Continuing Education (AAACE) in Oklahoma City, Oklahoma. In 2016, thirteen exemplary educators were recognized with induction in conjunction with the Online Learning Consortium (OLC) International Conference. In 2017, nine educators were inducted into the International Adult and Continuing Education Hall of Fame in Suwon City, South Korea, during the UNESCO-CONFITA VI conference.

In 2018, the 23rd induction ceremony was held in New Orleans, Louisiana, during the national convention of the Association of Public and Land-Grant Universities (APLU). Thirteen outstanding educators were inducted into the International Adult and Continuing Education Hall of Fame. 2019 the induction took place in Belgrade, Serbia, 2020 in Philadelphia (USA), and 2022 in Cork, Ireland.
