= Mitzie Collins =

- Born: 29 August 1941 (age 84)
- Genres: British traditional, American folk
- Occupation: Instrumentalist
- Instrument: Hammered dulcimer
- Years active: 1977-present
- Website: www.samplerfolkmusic.com

Mitzie Collins (born 29 August 1941) as Mary Ellen Collins in Dallas, Texas, is an American musician, most notable as an interpreter of traditional British and American vocal and instrumental music.

She has arranged songs, including Genesee County waltzes. Collins is a player of the dulcimer and other instruments, including the piano, organ, harpsichord, and banjo. As a recording and concert artist, she is best known for playing traditional music for the hammered dulcimer, and has released many albums on Sampler Records, a label she founded.

For many years, Collins formed one third of the folk group The Sampler Trio, which also included harpist Roxanne Ziegler and flautist Glennda Dove, with whom Collins has recorded extensively in a series of albums, including several popular Christmas albums. Collins is also one of the directors of the Striking Strings Hammered Dulcimer Ensemble, a large ensemble consisting entirely of hammered dulcimerists, who perform around Western New York. Some of her many albums are Ornaments—Music for Christmas, Be Thou My Vision—Favorite Hymns for Dulcimer and St. Patrick's Day in the Morning—Music of Irish Inspiration.

Collins has also performed extensively with tenor Casey Jones Costello, who has served as the featured tenor soloist with both The Sampler Trio and the Striking Strings Hammered Dulcimer Ensemble. Collins and Costello have also performed extensively as a duo, in multiple programs including a series of concerts featuring 19th and early 20th century popular songs titled Sentimental Songs of Bygone Days, with Collins accompanying Costello on multiple instruments including piano, hammered dulcimer, and banjo.

For ten years, Collins hosted Sounds Like Fun, a children's radio show on WXXI-FM in Rochester, New York. Collins is president of Sampler Records Ltd. in Rochester, New York. She is also on the faculty of the Eastman School of Music, and she teaches several classes, including hammered dulcimer classes, at the Eastman Community Music School.

== Discography ==
- The Leaves of Life (1979) (folk songs and children's songs) (vinyl only, not on cd)
- Sounds Like Fun (folk songs, games, and poems for children)
- Scotland the Brave
- St. Patrick's Day in the Morning (with Roxanne Ziegler)
- White Dulcimer Christmas
- Nowell (with Roxanne Ziegler and Glennda Dove)
- Ornaments (with Roxanne Ziegler)
- Rejoice (with Roxanne Ziegler and Glennda Dove)
- By Thou My Vision (with Esther Kreek, Kinloch Nelson, and Glennda Dove)
- Traditional Irish Music (with William Sullivan)
