= 1930–1945 in Western fashion =

1930–1945 in Western fashion may refer to:

- 1930s in fashion
- 1940s in fashion
