= History of comics =

The history of comics has followed different paths in different parts of the world. It can be traced back to early precursors such as Trajan's Column, in Rome, Egyptian hieroglyphs and the Bayeux Tapestry.

== Early narratives in art ==
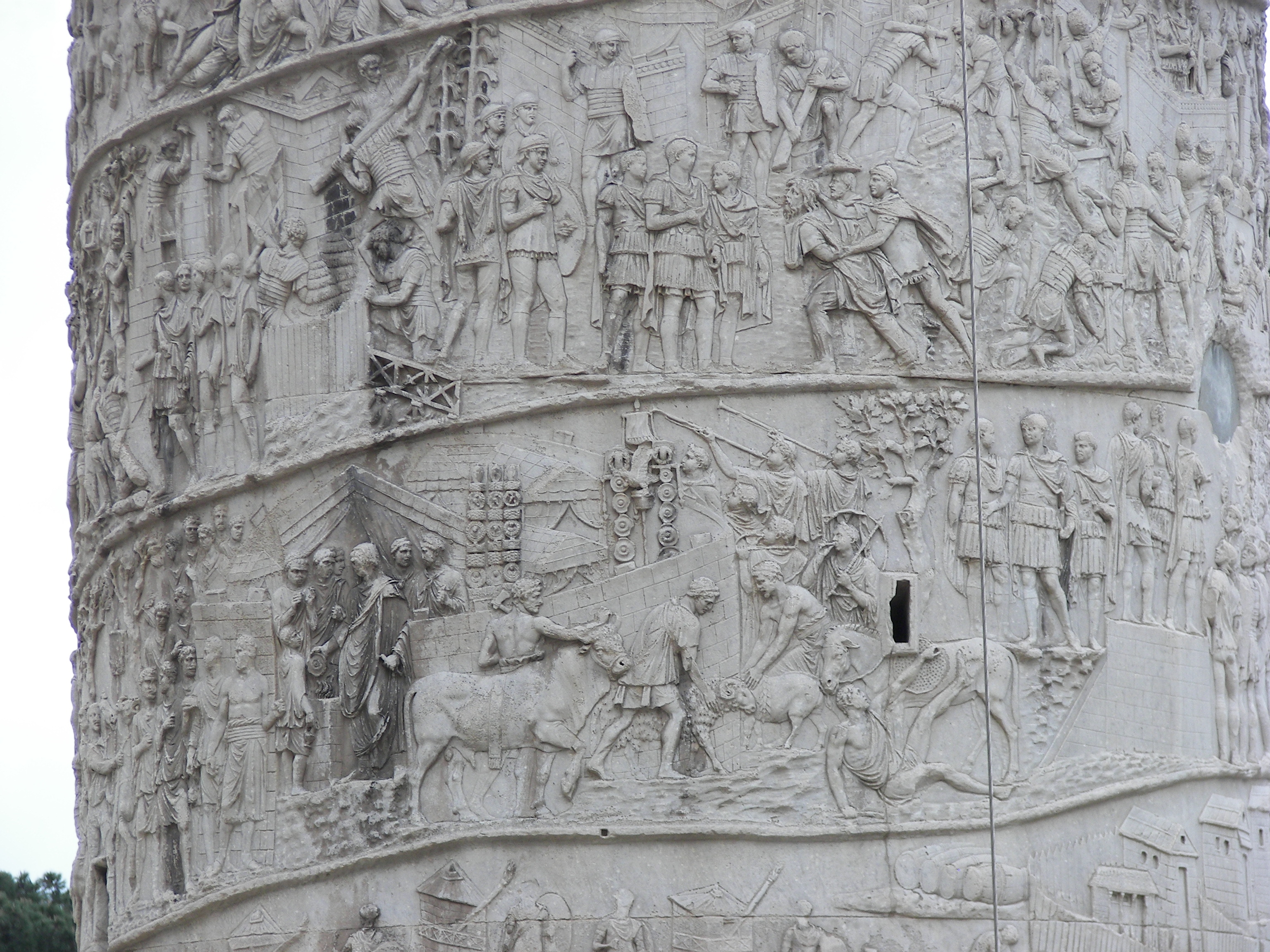
Sequential depictions on Trajan's Column in Rome, Italy

The earliest examples of humans using illustration for storytelling purposes goes back to cave paintings over 50,000 years ago. Examples of early sequential art can be found in Egyptian hieroglyphs, Greek friezes, Rome's Trajan's Column (dedicated in 110 AD), Maya script, medieval tapestries such as the Bayeux Tapestry and illustrated Christian manuscripts. In medieval paintings, multiple sequential scenes of the same story (usually a Biblical one) appear simultaneously in the same painting.

An ancient tradition in India, possibly dating back to at least 700 BCE, had picture showmen narrating stories that were simultaneously presented in painted pictures (also the origin of shadow play with jointed puppets).

It took the invention of modern printing techniques to bring the form to a wide audience and become a mass medium.

== Early printing and cartoons ==
Early printed material concentrated on religious subjects, with densely illustrated versions of the Bible as a widely distributed medium that combined many images with text in order to bring the teachings of Christianity to the illiterate.

Through the 17th and 18th centuries, prints began to tackle aspects of political and social life, and also started to satirize and caricature. Occasionally, prints would contain several images to relate multiple scenes of a narrative, for instance in Frans Hogenberg's depictions of the Spanish Fury (1576) and the murder of Henry III of France (1589).

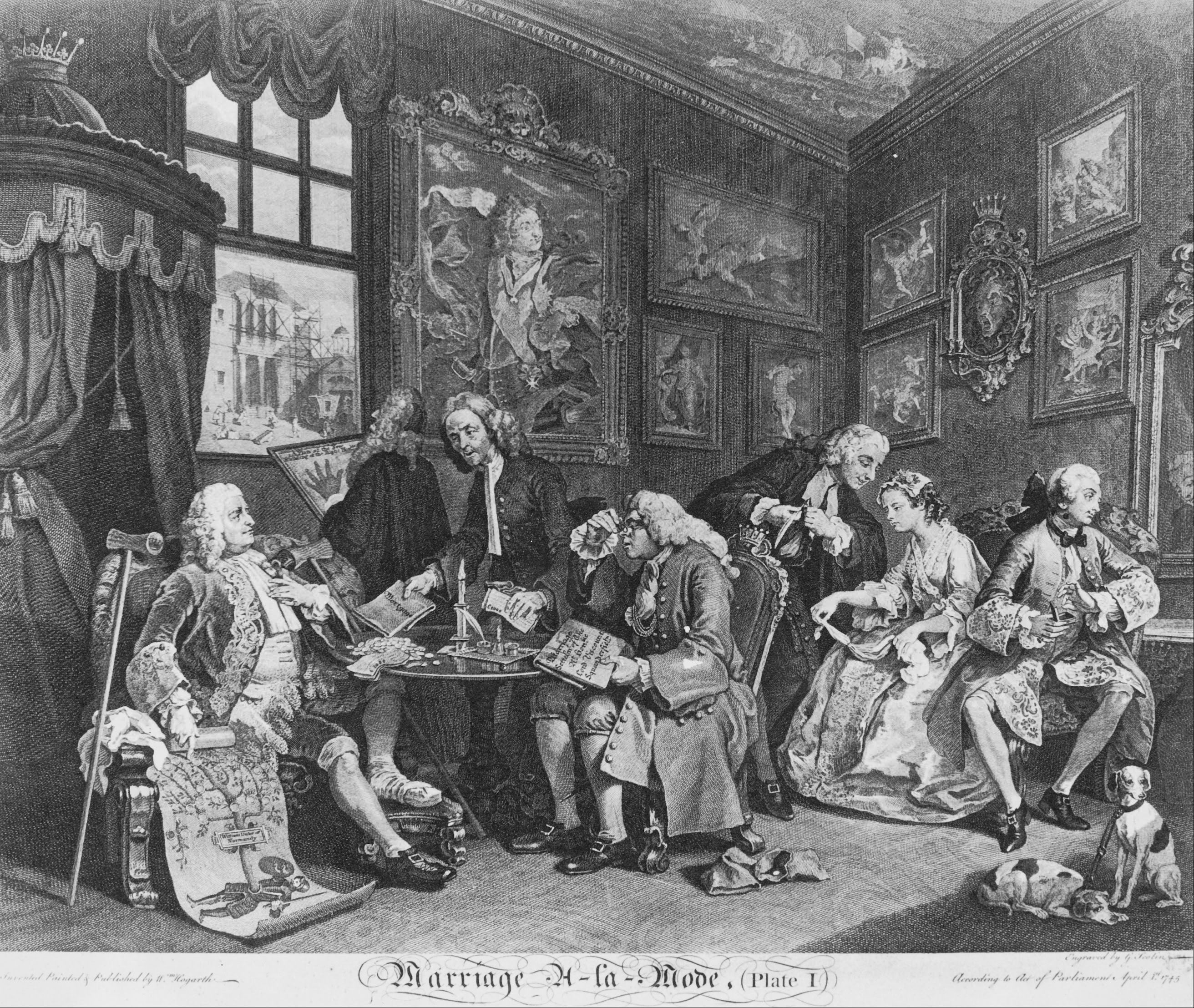
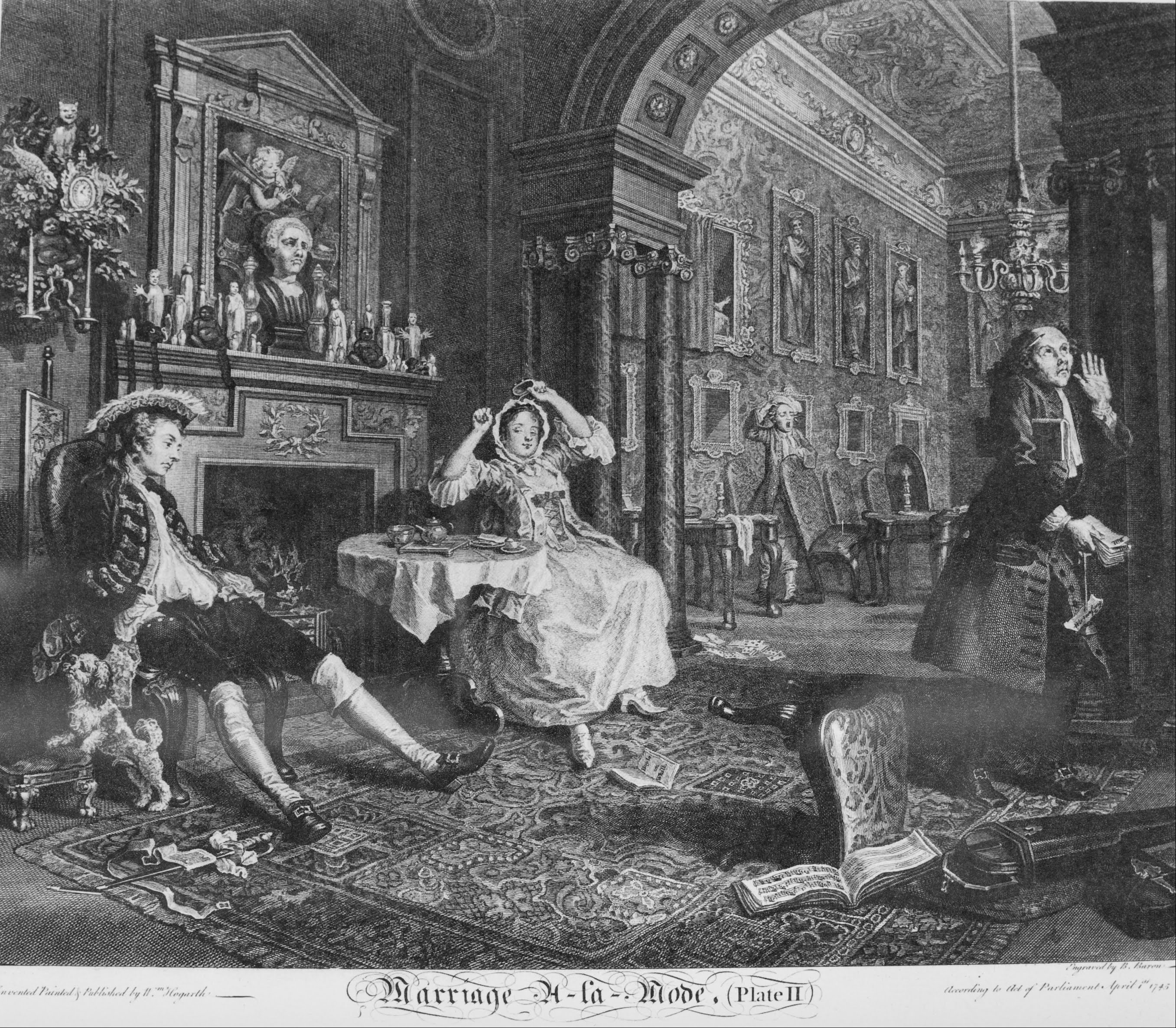
The first two of six plates in Hogarth's "Marriage à la Mode" series. The first plate depicts the signing of a marriage contract between the wealthy Lord Squanderfield and the bride's poor merchant father. The second plate depicts a morning in the couple's home after a night out. The dog pulls a bonnet out of the husband's pocket which may allude to infidelity as the wife is already wearing a bonnet.

One of the first British creators of sequential series of satirical art was William Hogarth (1697–1764). Hogarth created seven sets of sequential images on "Modern Moral Subjects". One of his works, A Rake's Progress, was composed of a number of canvases, each reproduced as a print, and the eight prints together created a narrative. As printing techniques developed, due to the technological advances of the Industrial Revolution, magazines and newspapers were established. These publications sometimes utilized illustrations as a means of commenting on political and social issues, such illustrations becoming known as "cartoons" since 1842.

While surviving works of these periods, such as Francis Barlow's A True Narrative of the Horrid Hellish Popish Plot (c. 1682) as well as The Punishments of Lemuel Gulliver and A Rake's Progress by William Hogarth (1726), can be seen to establish a narrative over a number of images, it wasn't until the 19th century that the elements of such works began to crystallise into the comic strip.

The speech balloon also evolved over the centuries, from the medieval origins of the phylacter, a label, usually in the form of a scroll, which identified a character either through naming them or using a short text to explain their purpose. Artists such as George Cruikshank helped codify such phylacters as balloons rather than scrolls, though at this time they were still called labels. They now represented narrative, but for identification purposes rather than dialogue within the work, and artists soon discarded them in favour of running dialogue underneath the panels. Speech balloons were not reintroduced to the form until Richard F. Outcault used them for dialogue.

== Form established ==
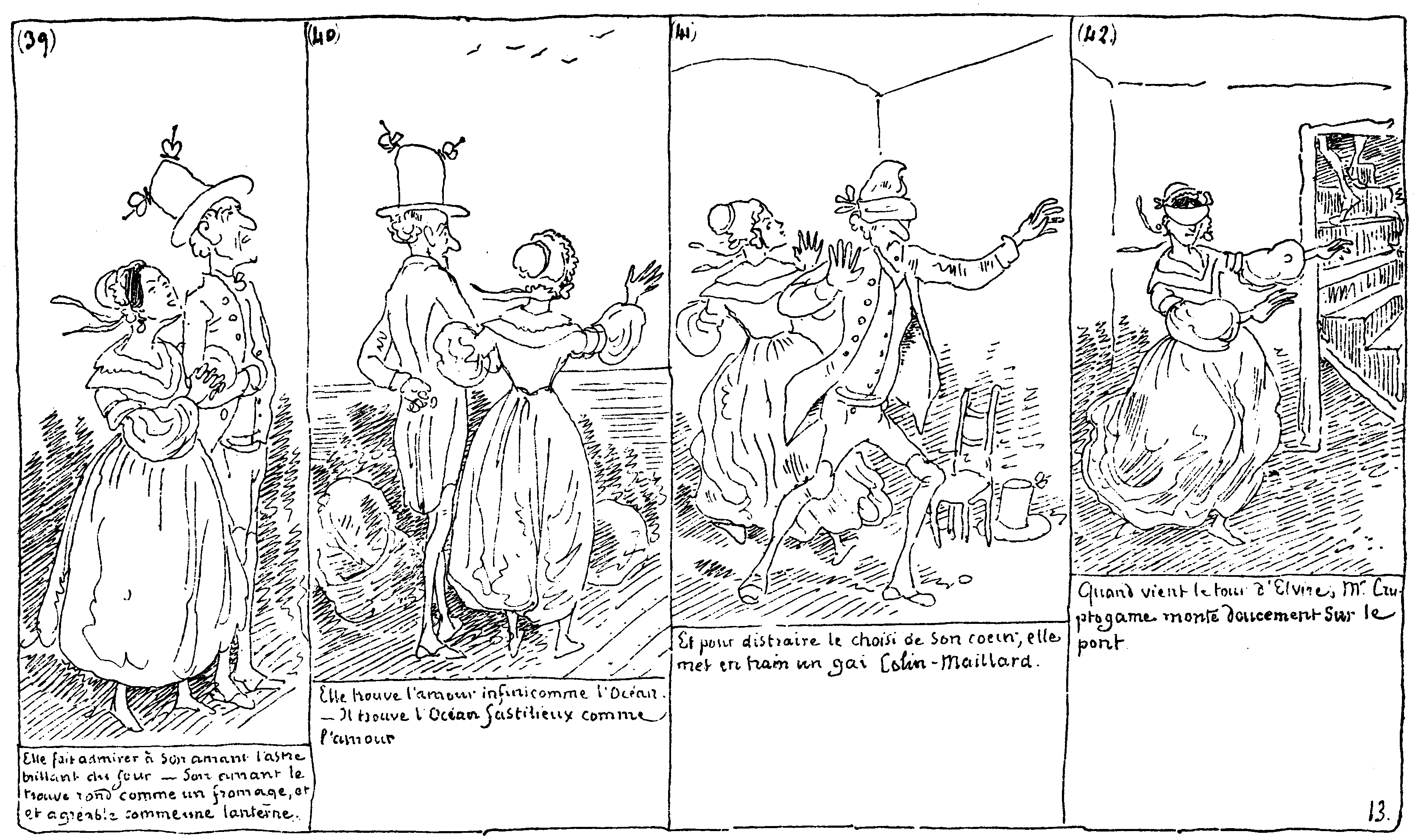
A page by Rodolphe Töpffer, whose work is considered influential in shaping the comics form.

The Glasgow Looking Glass, published in 1826, was arguably the first comic magazine. A satirical publication, later known as The Northern Looking Glass, it lampooned the fashions and politics of the times. It had most of the elements that make up the modern comic, including pictures with captions that display a continuous narrative told often in installments, and the use of speech bubbles, satire and caricature.

Rodolphe Töpffer, a Francophone Swiss artist, was a key figure in the early part of the 19th century. Töpffer's sequentially illustrated stories, with text compartmentalized below images, were reprinted throughout Europe. In 1837, he published Histoire de Mr. Vieux Bois which was also published in the United States in 1842 as The Adventures of Obadiah Oldbuck. The lack of copyright laws at the time meant that pirated editions proliferated, and translated versions created a market on both continents for similar works. In 1845, Töpffer formalised his thoughts on the picture story (French: histoire en estampes) in his Essay on Physiognomics (Essai de physiognomonie): "To construct a picture-story does not mean you must set yourself up as a master craftsman, to draw out every potential from your material—often down to the dregs! It does not mean you just devise caricatures with a pencil naturally frivolous. Nor is it simply to dramatize a proverb or illustrate a pun. You must actually invent some kind of play, where the parts are arranged by plan and form a satisfactory whole. You do not merely pen a joke or put a refrain in couplets. You make a book: good or bad, sober or silly, crazy or sound in sense."

Panels from the illustrated story Some of the Mysteries of Loan and Discount, featuring Ally Sloper (1867).

In 1845, the satirical drawings, which regularly appeared in newspapers and magazines, gained a name: cartoons. (In art, a cartoon is a pencil or charcoal sketch to be overpainted.) The British magazine Punch, launched in 1841, referred to its 'humorous pencilings' as cartoons in a satirical reference to the Parliament of the day, who were themselves organising an exhibition of cartoons, or preparatory drawings, at the time. This usage became common parlance, lasting to the present day. Similar magazines containing cartoons in continental Europe included Fliegende Blätter and Le Charivari, while in the U.S. Judge and Puck were popular.

1865 saw the publication of Max and Moritz by Wilhelm Busch by a German newspaper. Busch refined the conventions of sequential art, and his work was a key influence within the form, Rudolph Dirks was inspired by the strip to create The Katzenjammer Kids in 1897.

=== First serialized comics for a mass audience ===
The first weekly comic to feature a regular character was Ally Sloper's Half Holiday, which debuted in the British humour magazine Judy in 1867 and was created by C. H. Ross and illustrated by his French wife Émilie de Tessier. In 1884 the then highly popular character was spun off into his own comic, Ally Sloper's Half Holiday published by Dalziel Brothers, eight pages long and printed in black and white at tabloid size. The magazine was extremely popular with the working class and may have had a circulation as high as 350,000. In 1890, two more comic magazines debuted to the British public, Comic Cuts and Illustrated Chips, establishing the tradition of the British comic as an anthology periodical containing comic strips.

In the United States, R. F. Outcault's work in combining speech balloons and images on Hogan's Alley and The Yellow Kid (appearing in 1895) has been credited as establishing the form and conventions of the comic strip, though academics have uncovered earlier works that combine speech bubbles and a multi image narrative. However, the popularity of Outcalt's work and the position of the strip in a newspaper retains credit as a driving force of the form.

== 20th-century mass medium ==
The 1920s and 1930s saw further booms within the industry. The market for comic anthologies in Britain turned to targeting children through juvenile humor, with The Dandy and The Beano. In 1929, Hergé created the Adventures of Tintin newspaper strip for a Belgian-market comic supplement, Le Petit Vingtième; this was successfully collected in a bound comic album and created a market for further such works. The same period in the United States had seen newspaper comic strips expand their subject matter beyond humour, with action-adventure and mystery strips launched. The collection of such material also began, with The Funnies, a reprint collection of newspaper strips, published in tabloid size in 1929.

A market for such comic books soon followed. The first modern American-style comic book, Famous Funnies: A Carnival of Comics (also a reprint collection of newspaper strips), was released in the U.S. in 1933 and by 1938 publishers were printing original material in the new format. It was at this point that Action Comics #1 launched, with Superman as the cover feature. The popularity of the character swiftly enshrined superhero comics as the defining comics genre of American comic books. The genre lost popularity in the 1950s but re-established its domination of the form from the 1960s until the late 20th century.

In Japan, a country with a long tradition of illustration, comics were hugely popular. Referred to as manga, the Japanese form was established after World War II by Osamu Tezuka, who expanded the page count of work to number in the hundreds, and who developed a filmic style, heavily influenced by the Disney cartoons of the time. The Japanese market expanded its range to cover works in many genres, from juvenile fantasy through romance to adult fantasies. Japanese manga is typically published in large anthologies, containing several hundred pages, and the stories told have long been used as sources for adaptation into animated film. In Japan, such films are referred to as anime, and many creators work in both forms simultaneously, leading to an intrinsic linking of the two forms.

During the latter half of the 20th century comics became a very popular item for collectors and from the 1970s American comics publishers have actively encouraged collecting and shifted a large portion of comics publishing and production to appeal directly to the collector's community.

The modern double use of the term comic, as an adjective describing a genre, and a noun designating an entire medium, has been criticised as confusing and misleading. In the 1960s and 1970s, underground cartoonists used the spelling comix to distinguish their work from mainstream newspaper strips and juvenile comic books. Their work was written for an adult audience but was usually comedic, so the "comic" label was still appropriate. The term graphic novel was popularized in the late 1970s, having been coined at least two decades previous, to distance the material from this confusion.

In the 1980s, comics scholarship started to blossom in the U.S., and a resurgence in the popularity of comics was seen, with Alan Moore and Frank Miller producing notable superhero works and Bill Watterson's Calvin & Hobbes, and Gary Larson's The Far Side being syndicated.

Webcomics have grown in popularity since the mid-1990s. Since the inception of the World Wide Web, artists have been able to self-publish comics on the Internet for a low cost. Hosting providers specifically designed for webcomics, such as Keenspot and Modern Tales, allow for a type of syndication of webcomics. Scott McCloud described in 2000 how creators of online comics can revolutionize the medium by embracing the digital space and making use of techniques such as infinite canvas. Webcomics became more prolific in the early 2000s, as respected comics awards such as the Eagle and Eisner Awards started adding categories for digital comics.

== See also ==
- Comics historiography
- History of American comics
- History of animation
- History of anime
- History of Franco-Belgian comics
- History of manga
- List of years in comics
