= Text comics =

Oldest form of comics, where the stories are told in captions below the images

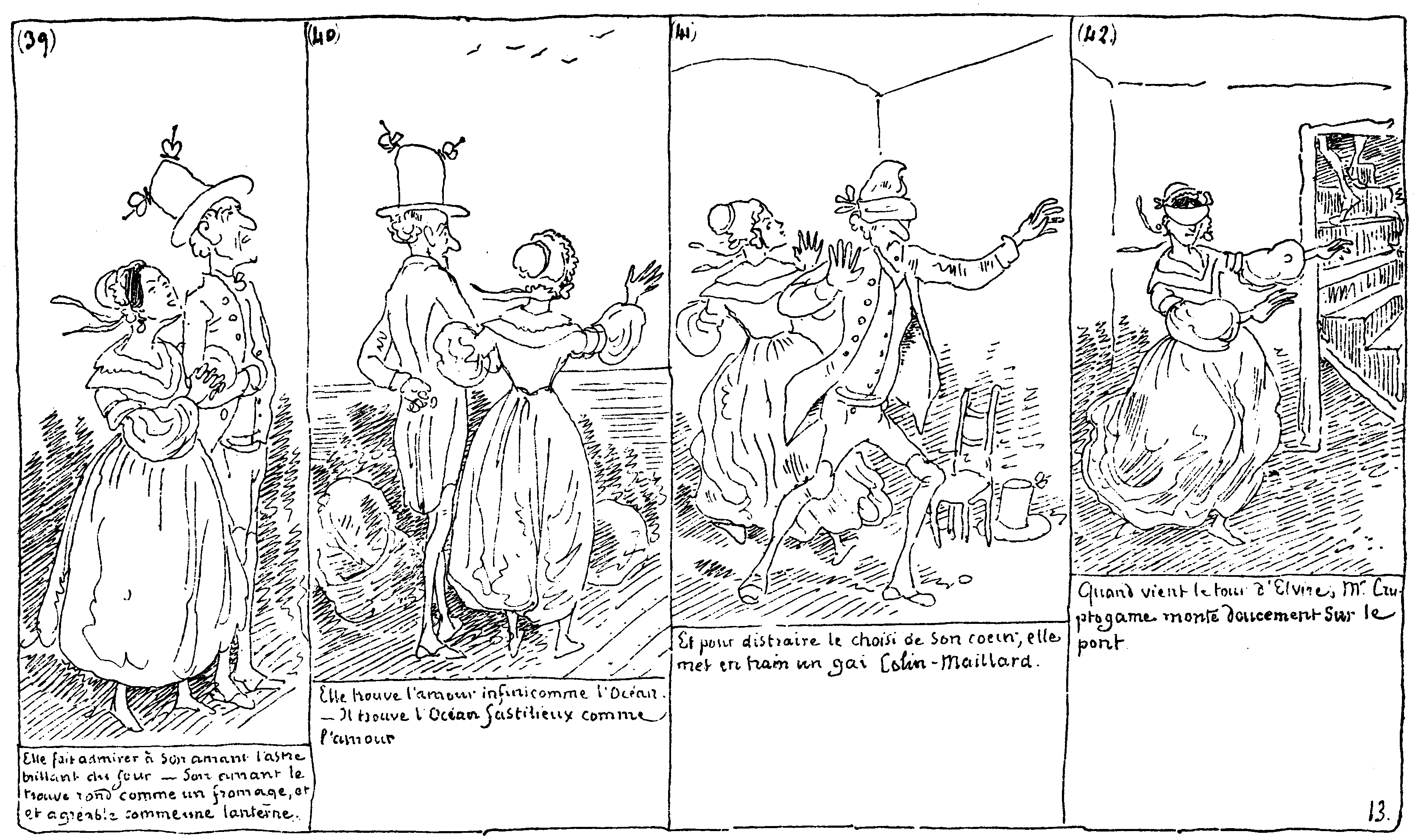
Histoire de Monsieur Cryptogame (1830) by Rodolphe Töpffer, an early example of a text comic. Notice the text underneath the images

Text comics or a text comic is a form of comics where the stories are told in captions below the images and without the use of speech balloons. It is the oldest form of comics and was especially dominant in European comics from the 19th century until the 1950s, after which it gradually lost popularity in favor of comics with speech balloons.

== Definition ==
A text comic is published as a series of illustrations that can be read as a continuous story. However, within the illustrations themselves no text is used: no speech balloons, no onomatopoeias, no written indications to explain where the action takes place or how much time has passed. In order to understand what is happening in the drawings the reader has to read the captions below each image, where the story is written out in the same style as a novel.

Much like other comics text comics were pre-published in newspapers and weekly comics magazines as a continuous story, told in daily or weekly episodes. When published in book format the comics were sometimes published as actual illustrated novels. In some cases the original text was kept, but only a few drawings were used as illustrations, rather than the entire comic. In the Netherlands text comics were published in small rectangular books, called oblong books, due to the shape of the books.

== History ==
Text comics are older than balloon comics. Ancient Egyptian wall paintings with hieroglyphs explaining the images are the oldest predecessors. In the late 17th century and early 19th century picture narratives were popular in Western Europe, such as Les Grandes Misères de la guerre (1633) by Jacques Callot, History of the Hellish Popish Plot (1682) by Francis Barlow, the cartoons of William Hogarth, Thomas Rowlandson and George Cruikshank. These images provided visual stories which often placed captions below the images to explain a moral message.

The earliest examples of text comics are the Swiss comics series Histoire de Mr. Vieux Bois (1827) by Rodolphe Töpffer, the French comics Les Travaux d'Hercule (1847), Trois artistes incompris et mécontents (1851), Les Dés-agréments d'un voyage d'agrément (1851) and L'Histoire de la Sainte Russie (1854) by Gustave Doré, the German Max und Moritz (1866) by Wilhelm Busch and the British Ally Sloper (1867) by Charles Henry Ross and Émilie de Tessier. Töpffer often put considerable effort in the narrative captions of his graphic narratives, which made them just as distinctive and appealing as the drawings. Wilhelm Busch used rhyming couplets in his captions.

During the 19th century and the first half of the 20th century text comics were the dominant form in Europe. In the United States of America the speech balloon made its entry in comics with 1895's The Yellow Kid by Richard F. Outcault. Frederick Burr Opper's Happy Hooligan and Alphonse and Gaston further popularized the technique. As speech balloons asked for less text to read and had the advantage of linking the dialogues directly to the characters who were speaking or thinking, they allowed readers to connect better with the stories. By the early 1900s most American newspaper comics had switched to the speech balloon format.

While speech balloon comics became the norm in the United States, the format didn't always catch on as well in the rest of the world. In Mexico and Argentina speech balloons were adopted very quickly, while in Europe they remained a rarity until deep in the 1920s. In other parts of Europe, most notably the Netherlands, text comics even remained dominant as late as the early 1960s. Many European moral guardians looked down upon on comics as low-brow entertainment that made the youth too lazy to read. Christian comics magazines and newspapers closely supervised the content of their publications and preferred text comics, as the format still encouraged children to read actual written texts. They were also ideal to adapt classic novels and guide young readers towards "real" literature. In some instances, foreign balloon comics were simply re-adapted by erasing the balloons and adding captions underneath them. It even happened with the European Tintin in the Land of the Soviets (1929) by Hergé, which was republished in the French magazine Coeurs Vaillants, but with captions. Other comics, like Pip, Squeak and Wilfred by Bertram Lamb, used both speech balloons and captions. Under the Nazi, Fascist and Communist regimes in Western and/or Eastern Europe balloon comics were even banned in favor of comics with captions underneath them.

The success of The Adventures of Tintin by Hergé from 1929 on, influenced many other European comics, especially in the Franco-Belgian comics market, to adopt speech balloons. Translations of popular American comics such as Mickey Mouse, Donald Duck, Popeye throughout the 1930s and especially after the liberation of Europe in 1945 further encouraged the speech balloon format. By the 1960s text comics had lost popularity worldwide and only a few remained.

== Classic text comics ==
=== Europe ===
==== Belgium ====
- L' Aventure des Belges/België in Beeld by Louis Haché and Georges H. Dumont.
- Les aventures de "Tim" l'écureuil au Far-West by Hergé.
- The Adventures of Totor by Hergé.
- Bert, de Lustige Trekker by Willy Vandersteen.
- Flup, Nénesse, Poussette et Cochonnet by Hergé (combined text below the images with speech ballons).
- Jonas en de Wonderwinkel by Gommaar Timmermans, aka GoT.
- Het Kerkelijk Jaar in Beeld by Jozef 'Jos' Speybrouck.
- M. Coremans au tir national (1861) by Félicien Rops.
- De Avonturen van Neus by Marc Sleen.
- Neuske by Marc Sleen.
- Peerke Sorgeloos by Willy Vandersteen.
- Victor Sébastopol by Hubuc and Jacques Devos.

==== Bulgaria ====
- Vesel Putniks Balon by Vadim Lazarkevich

==== Denmark ====
- Lise og Lasse by Henning Dahl Mikkelsen, aka Mik, later continued by Ib Steinaa.
- Rasmus Klump by Vilhelm Hansen and Carla Hansen.

==== Finland ====
- Janne Ankkanen by Ola Fogelberg.
- Kieku ja Kaiku by Mika Waltari (text) and Asmo Alho (art).
- Pekka Puupää by Ola Fogelberg.

==== France ====
- Arabella by Jean Ache.
- Les Aventures de M. Barnichon L'Aéronaute by Félix Nadar.
- Les Aventures de Monsieur Verdreau by Louis Morel-Retz, aka Stop.
- Bécassine by Caumery and Émile-Joseph Porphyre Pinchon.
- Les Dés-agréments d'un voyage d'agrément (1851) by Gustave Doré.
- La Famille Fenouillard by Georges Colomb.
- Les Folies de la Commune by Amédée de Noé.
- Les Grandes Misères de la guerre (1633) by Jacques Callot.
- L'Histoire de la Sainte Russie (1854) by Gustave Doré.
- Histoire de Mr. Tuberculus and Histoire de Mr. Grenouillet (1856) by Timoléon Lobrichon.
- Ma Maison de Campagne et Mon Architecte by Félix Nadar.
- Les Pieds Nickelés by Louis Forton.
- Les Travaux d'Hercule (1847) by Gustave Doré.
- Trois artistes incompris et mécontents (1851) by Gustave Doré.
- Vie publique et privée de mossieu Réac by Félix Nadar.

==== Germany ====
- Die Arche Noah by Erich Schmitt.
- Chi-Chi by Heinz Rammelt.
- Der Contibuben by Erich Maria Remarque and Hermann Schütz.
- Max und Moritz by Wilhelm Busch.
- Meister Lapp und sein Lehrjunge Pips by Carl Reinhardt.
- Totentanz der Politik by Arpad Schmidhammer.
- Der Vergebliche Rattenjagd by Friedrich Lossow.

==== Hungary ====
- Gömböcz and Csukli by János Jankó.
- Hungarian Miska and German Miska. An old fairy tale about a common mule by János Jankó.

==== Italy ====
- Bilbolbul by Attilio Mussino.
- Forbiciotto by Carlo Squillante.
- Gennarino Tarantella by Carlo Squillante.
- Italino by Antonio Rubino.
- Marmittone by Bruno Angoletta.
- Quadratino by Antonio Rubino.
- Scarabocchio by Carlo Squillante.
- Signor Bonaventura by Sergio Tofano.
- Sor Pampurio by Carlo Bisi.

==== Netherlands ====
- De Avonturen van Pa Pinkelman by Godfried Bomans and Carol Voges.
- Bello by Marten Toonder.
- Birre Beer by Phiny Dick and Ton Beek.
- Bobo by Sergio Cavina, later continued by Valeria Turati
- Brommy & Tommy by Jan Dirk van Exter.
- Bulletje en Boonestaak by A.M. de Jong and George van Raemdonck.
- Dannie ben ik by Emile Brumsteede
- Dick Bos by Alfred Mazure.
- Drumpie's Dolle Avonturen by A. Reuvers.
- Eric de Noorman by Hans G. Kresse.
- Flippie Flink by Clinge Doorenbos and Louis Raemaekers.
- Fokkie Flink by Henk de Wolf and Joop Geesink.
- Kapitein Rob by Pieter Kuhn.
- Kappie by Marten Toonder.
- Koning Hollewijn by Marten Toonder.
- Minter en Hinter by Paul Biegel and Dick Vlottes.
- Mussengang by Bert Cornelius.
- Olle Kapoen by Phiny Dick.
- Panda by Marten Toonder.
- Paulus De Boskabouter (Paulus the woodgnome) by Jean Dulieu.
- Red Rat by Johannes van de Weert.
- Spotprent Op De Plannen Tot De Oprichting Van Een Girobank by Pieter van Loon.
- Tante Patent by Fiep Westendorp and Annie M.G. Schmidt.
- Tekko Taks by Henk Kabos.
- Tom Poes by Marten Toonder.
- Tup en Joep by Carol Voges.
- Turks Fruit by Dick Matena', a comic strip adaptation of Jan Wolkers' novel Turks Fruit (Turkish Delight).
- Vader & Zoon by Peter van Straaten.
- De Wonderlijke Avonturen van Anna by Opland.
- De wonderlijke geschiedenis van Tripje, Yoebje en Achmed by Henk Backer.

==== Poland ====
- Awantury i wybryki małej małpki Fiki-Miki by Kornel Makuszyński (text), Marian Walentynowicz (art).
- Koziołek Matołek by Kornel Makuszyński (text), Marian Walentynowicz (art).
- O Wawelskim Smoku by Kornel Makuszyński (text), Marian Walentynowicz (art).
- Wanda leży w naszej ziemi by Kornel Makuszyński (text), Marian Walentynowicz (art).

==== Portugal ====
- Aventuras sentimentais e dramáticas do senhor Simplício Baptista by Francisco Augusto Noguiera da Silva, aka Flora
- Index da Physiologia by Francisco Augusto Noguiera da Silva.
- As Quatro Luas do Matrimónio by Francisco Augusto Noguiera da Silva.

==== Sweden ====
- Jocke, Nicke, Majken by Petter Lindroth, aka Per Lindroth
- Spara och Slösa by Birgitta Lilliehöök
- Trisse och Trisselna by Lucie Lundberg:

==== Switzerland ====
- Histoire de Mr. Vieux Bois by Rodolphe Töpffer
- Papa Moll by Jürg Lendemann and Rolf Meier.

==== Turkey ====
- Amcabey by Cemal Nadir Güler.
- Çetin Kaptan by Ercüment Kalmik.
- Efruz Bey by Cemal Nadir Güler.
- Pazar Ola Hasan Bey by Orhan Ural.

==== United Kingdom ====
The British comics magazines Jack and Jill and Playhour published most of its comics in text comic format.

- The Adventures of Miss Lavinia Brounjones by Charles Keene.
- Ally Sloper by Charles H. Ross and Marie Duval (Emilie de Tessier)
- Billy Bimbo and Peter Porker by Harry Folkard.
- The Bunty's Boys by Herbert Sydney Foxwell (combined text comics with speech balloons).
- Casey Court by Julius Stafford Baker II.
- Freddie the Frog by Peter Woolcock, Jim Turnbull Antonio Lupatelli Sergio Asteriti. and Gordon Hutchings.
- Gulliver Guinea-Pig by Philip Mendoza, continued by Gordon Hutchings.
- Homeless Hector by Bertie Brown (a combination of text comics with balloon comics).
- The Horrid Popish Plot by Francis Barlow, a 1682 picture story which combined the text comics format with speech balloons.
- Jimmy and his Magic Patch by Dudley D. Watkins.
- Jungle Jinks by Arthur White. and Mabel Francis Taylor.
- Katie Country Mouse by Philip Mendoza.
- Magical Mystery Tour by Bob Gibson, a text comic based on the 1967 TV film Magical Mystery Tour, available inside the sleeve of the soundtrack album.
- The Merry Tales of Mimi and Marny by Jim Turnbull.
- Mr. Crindle's Rapid Career Upon Town by Henry George Hine.
- Morgyn the Mighty by Dudley D. Watkins (started out as a text comic when it debuted in 1928, but was turned into a balloon comic when Watkins republished it a decade later in The Beano).
- Mr. Spoonbill by John Tenniel.
- Peter Piper by John Tenniel.
- Pip, Squeak and Wilfred by Bertram Lamb and Austin Bowen Payne (combined text balloons with captions below the images.)
- Princess Petal by Philip Mendoza.
- Rupert Bear by Mary Tourtel.
- Rupert the Chick by Arthur White.
- Smiler and Smudge by Bertie Brown (a combination of text comics with balloon comics).
- Tall Thomas and Butterball by H. O'Neill.
- Teddy Tail by Charles Folkard, Harry Folkard Herbert Sidney Foxwell, Arthur Potts, William St. John Glenn.
- Those Terrible Twins (1898-1900) by Frank Holland.
- Tiger Tim by Julius Stafford Baker II. and Herbert Sydney Foxwell. (During its original run it combined the text comics format with speech balloons).
- The Tooth-Ache by Horace Mayhew and George Cruikshank.
- Weary Willy and Tired Tim by Tom Browne.
- Winifred and Stephanie by Philip Mendoza.

=== North America ===
==== Canada ====
- The Brownies by Palmer Cox.

==== United States ====
- The Doubtful Guest by Edward Gorey
- Flora Flirt by Katharine P. Rice.
- Foxy Grandpa by Carl E. Schultze
- The Gashlycrumb Tinies by Edward Gorey
- Gretchen Gratz by Inez Townsend (British-born artist, later moved to the United States)
- Illustrated Sunday School Lesson by Alfred J. Buescher (written by Reverend Alvin E. Bell, Newman Campbell and R.H. Ramsay)
- Jack Daw's Adventures by Leslie Elton
- Mr. Tweedy by Ned Riddle
- Nervy Nat by James Montgomery Flagg and Arthur Lewis
- Prince Valiant by Hal Foster
- Snooks and Snicks, the Mischievous Twins by Inez Townsend (British-born artist, later moved to the United States)
- The Spotty Twins by Art Bowen (combination of a ballon comic with a text comic).
- The Upside Downs of Little Lady Lovekins and Old Man Muffaroo by Gustave Verbeek
- Wee Willie Winkie's World by Lyonel Feininger
- Whisk by Walt Kuhn
- Willie Westinghouse Edison Smith, The Boy Inventor by Frank Crane (originally started off as a text comic, later became a balloon comic).

=== South America ===
==== Brazil ====
- As aventuras de Zé Caipora by Angelo Agostini.

=== Oceania ===
==== New Zealand ====
- Bobby and Betty by Noel Cook.

== See also ==
- Silent comics
