= Histoire de Mr. Vieux Bois =

Comic book album by Rodolphe Töpffer

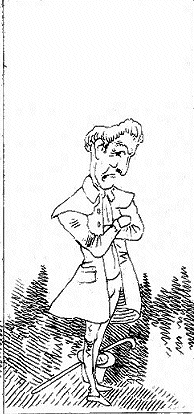
- Panel from Histoire de Mr. Vieux-Bois

Publication information
- Format: Text comics
- Genre: Humor, text comics
- Publication date: 1837

Creative team
- Written by: Rodolphe Töpffer
- Artist: Rodolphe Töpffer

Histoire de Mr. Vieux-Bois (also known as Les amours de Mr. Vieux-Bois, or simply Mr. Vieux-Bois), published in English as The Adventures of Mr. Obadiah Oldbuck (sometimes referred to simply as Obadiah Oldbuck), is a 19th-century publication written and illustrated by the Swiss caricaturist Rodolphe Töpffer.

It was created in 1827 and published first in Geneva, Switzerland in 1837 as Histoire de Mr. Vieux-Bois, then in London in 1841 by Tilt and Bogue editions as the book The Adventures of Mr. Obadiah Oldbuck, and then in New York, U.S., in a newspaper supplement titled Brother Jonathan Extra No. IX (September 14, 1842), followed by an 1849 republication as a book titled The Adventures of Mr. Obadiah Oldbuck, published in New York by Wilson & Co. The English-language editions were unlicensed copies of the original work as they were done without Töpffer's authorization.

Oldbuck is commonly referred to as the first comic book printed in the U.S. and America's first newspaper comic.

== Format ==
Rather than utilizing speech balloons, the format consists of sequential pictures with captions, a.k.a. "text comics", which had been common in political cartoons since the 1770s. In Understanding Comics, comics theorist Scott McCloud says Töpffer's work is in many ways "the father of the modern comic". McCloud emphasizes Töpffer's use of "cartooning and panel borders" along with "the first interdependent combination of words and pictures seen in Europe".

Töpffer described comics as a medium appealing particularly to children and the lower classes, and this is evident in the style of the work. It is notable that the story was never intended for publication but rather as an idle "diversion" for his close friends; however, the story achieved widespread popularity in several countries.

Töpffer used a lithography method called autography, in which the pen draws on specially prepared paper, allowing a freer line than the engraving of the time. Autography lithographs also did not require the drawings to be flipped horizontally.

== Plot ==
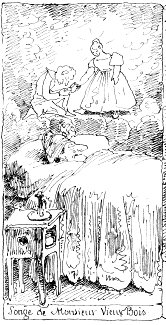
Mr. Vieux Bois' dream

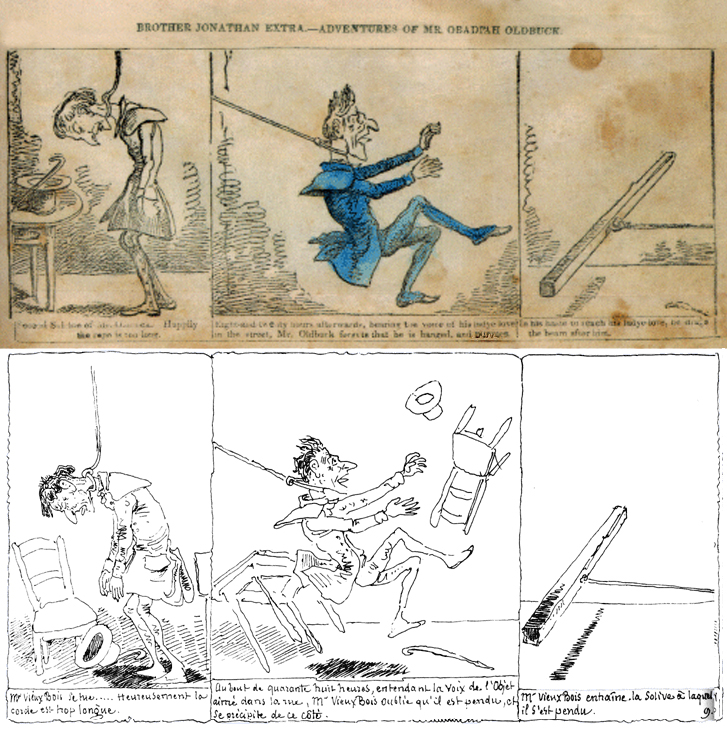
Comparison between the American version and the Swiss version

Mr. Vieux Bois encounters a young woman and instantly falls in love. His initial attempts at courting are ignored, followed by short periods of his desperation. He discovers a rival suitor and challenges him to a duel. He is better with his dueling sword and his rival has to flee. Vieux Bois contacts the parents of his girlfriend, seeking her hand in marriage. He returns home and starts to celebrate loudly. His celebration ends with his arrest for disturbing the neighbours. The marriage is called off and he feels suicidal.

He then goes traveling but falls prey to highwaymen. Seeking refuge in a lair, he meets a hermit who persuades him to join the local cloister. After two weeks he escapes the cloister dressed in drag. At home he finds a letter from his love interest, finally returning his affection. They flee on his horse, but Vieux Bois is apprehended by monks and returned to prison. Released, he flees again with his fiancée.

On his wedding day Vieux Bois leaves his home for the church but then returns to place his dog as guard outside the house. Consequently, he arrives late for his own wedding. His in-laws had tired of waiting and called off the marriage again. He tries to shoot himself in the head but only wounds his face. He is mistaken for dead and buried. Crows digging at his grave finally manage to awake him. His return home terrifies his inheritors. As soon as he changes his clothes, he is again arrested for assault. He defends himself in court but nevertheless ends up sentenced to imprisonment for a year. His only cellmate is his loyal dog.

They soon manage to escape by opening a hole in the roof. He jumps to the roof of the neighbouring house but his dog falls into the chimney. The house belongs to his object of affection and her parents. Mr. Vieux Bois falls from the roof and onto a street lamp. He flees the local police. Meanwhile, the resident family climbs the chimney to the rooftop in order to meet the dog's owner. They find nobody and are then trapped on the roof.

Three days later Mr. Vieux Bois returns disguised as an officer. He searches for his lady love and is informed that the whole family is still missing. He leaves to search for them. The following day, a chimney sweep discovers the whole family. Vieux Bois encounters one of the monks responsible for his imprisonment. He cuts off his beard in revenge but then has to flee a legion of vengeful monks.

He returns empty-handed to his hometown. The chimney sweep informs him of the rescue of his lady. Led to the roof, he finds his lost dog. He stays on the roof for nine days in an effort to communicate with his love, not realizing the family has moved. On the ninth day he leaves the roof and reestablishes contact with his lady. They flee again with horse and carriage. Mr. Vieux Bois is rushing the horse and manages to cover 18 leagues in three hours only to find that the carriage containing his lady was lost at some point.

The carriage has been loaded on a stagecoach heading for Paris. But its weight eventually overturns the stagecoach into a river. A passenger seeks refuge on the river-floating carriage. He is identified as the rival driven away at the duel months ago. He drives the carriage to the shore and attempts to release the woman from it. Before he can do so Vieux Bois arrives, posing as a highwayman. He forces his old rival to keep his face on the ground. Then he enters the locked door of the carriage, releases his lady, forces his rival to enter it and throws it into the river again.

The lady complains of exhaustion and seems to have lost weight. Her lover leads her to the mountains where she can pursuit a fattening diet. Meanwhile, he adopts a pastoral lifestyle under the name of "'Tircis". Several pages are devoted to the sleeping woman changing hands between the two persistent rivals for her affection. When she awakes she finds Vieux Bois with a new donkey, taken from his opponent.

On their way home they have to cross the grounds of the local monastery where they have several enemies. The man disguises himself as a miller and the woman as a sack of flour. The monks stop them anyway to examine the cargo. They are scared to find it squealing. The "miller" assures them it contains the Devil. The monks flee but return with reinforcements. The couple are condemned as sorcerers and sentenced to execution by burning. The execution is carelessly prepared and the prisoners take advantage of the smoke to flee towards the river. There their old carriage is found standing. Two pursuing monks are approaching. Knowing them well, Vieux Bois throws some coins around and enters the carriage with his lady. The monks believe the carriage is filled with coins. In their greed they decide to keep it for themselves and dig a pit in order to bury it. When it gets deep enough, their prey exits the carriage and buries them up to their necks. Leaving the monks, the duo has one last encounter with the rival suitor before the story ends happily with their marriage.

== Film adaptation ==
Lortac and Cavé made an animated adaptation of the work in 1921, titled Histoire de Monsieur Vieux-Bois.

== See also ==
- History of American comics
- Picture story

Works

- Max and Moritz (1865) by Wilhelm Busch
- Ally Sloper (1867) by Charles H. Ross and Marie Duval
- The Yellow Kid (1894) by Richard F. Outcault
- Legende (2006 opera based on Monsieur Vieux Bois)
