= History of American comics =

American comics history

The history of American comics began in the 19th century in mass print media, in the era of sensationalist journalism, where newspaper comics served as further entertainment for mass readership. In the 20th century, comics became an autonomous art medium and an integral part of American culture.

== Overview ==
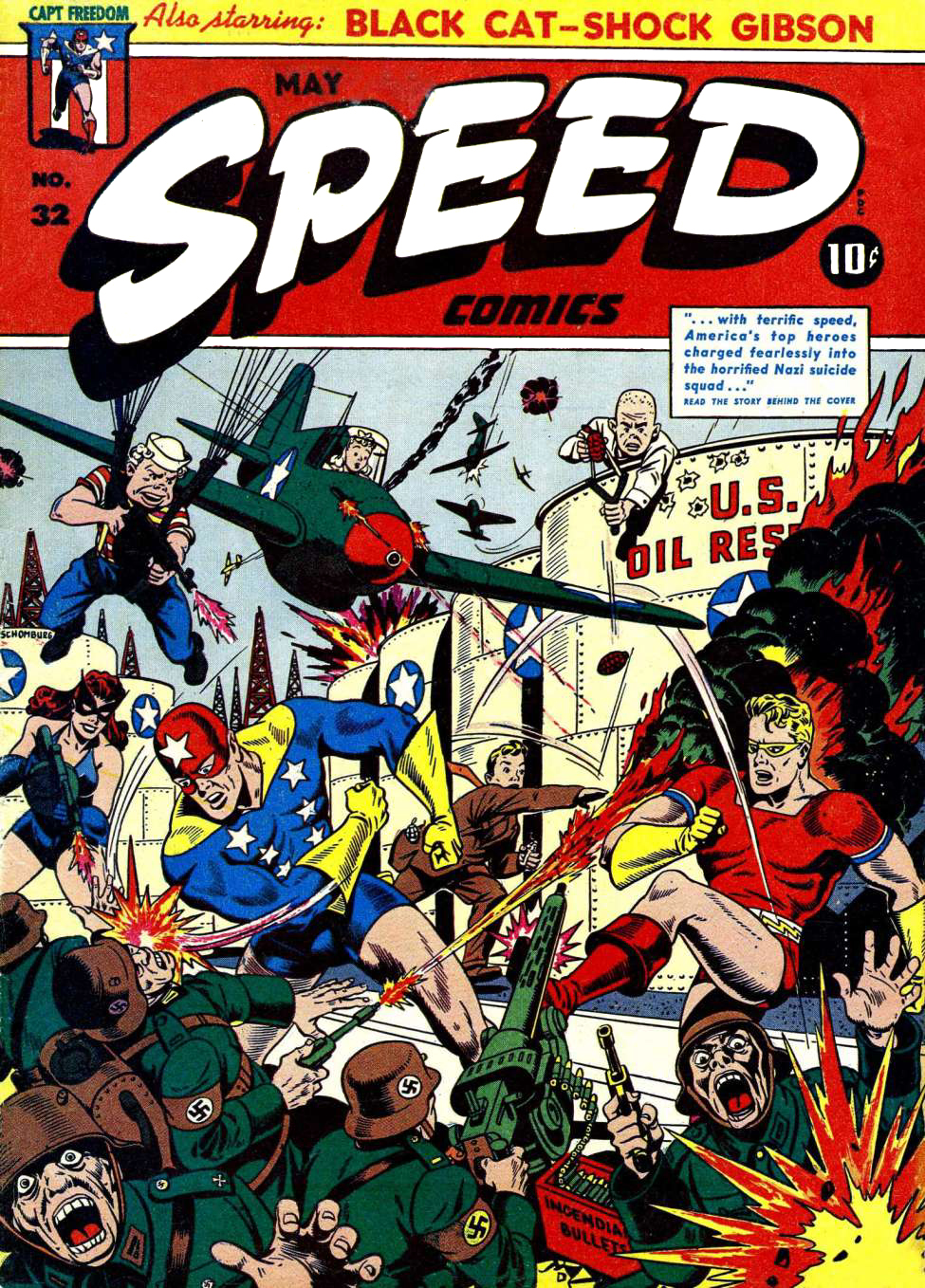
Harvey Comics' Speed Comics #32 (May 1944), cover art by Alex Schomburg

The history of American comics started in 1842 with the U.S. publication of Rodolphe Töpffer's work The Adventures of Mr. Obadiah Oldbuck, but the medium was initially developed through comic strips in daily newspapers. The seminal years of comic strips established its canonical features (e.g., speech balloons) and initial genres (family strips, adventure tales). Comic-strip characters became national celebrities, and were subject to cross-media adaptation, while newspapers competed for the most popular artists.

The first American-style true comic book, published independently of a newspaper (Famous Funnies: A Carnival of Comics), appeared in 1933. Although the first comic books were themselves newspaper-strip reprints, comics soon featured original material, and the first appearance of Superman in 1938 launched the Golden Age of Comic Books. During World War II, superheroes and talking animals were the most popular genres, but new genres were also developed (i.e., western, romance, and science fiction) and increased readership. Comic book sales began to decline in the early 1950s, and comics were socially condemned for their alleged harmful effects on children; to protect the reputation of comic books, the Comics Code Authority (CCA) was formed, but this eliminated the publication of crime and horror genres.

The Silver Age of Comic Books began in 1956 with a resurgence of interest in superheroes. Non-superhero sales declined and many publishers closed. Publishers introduced new and popular superheroes and thereby became the leading comics publisher in the Bronze Age of Comic Books (from 1970 to 1985). Unlike the Golden and Silver ages, the start of the Bronze Age is not marked by a single event. Although the Bronze Age was dominated by the superhero genres, underground comics appeared for the first time, which addressed new aesthetic themes and followed a new distribution model.

Following the Bronze Age, the Modern Age initially seemed to be a new golden age. Writers and artists redefined classic characters and launched new series that brought readership to levels not seen in decades, and landmark publications such as Maus redefined the medium's potential. The industry, however, soon experienced a series of financial shocks and crises that threatened its viability, and from which it took years to recover.

=== Periodization schemes ===
American comics historians generally divide 20th-century American comics history chronologically into ages. The first period, called Golden Age, extends from c. 1938 (first appearance of Superman in Action Comics #1 by National Allied Publications, a corporate predecessor of DC Comics) to 1956 (introduction of DC's second incarnation of The Flash). The following period, the Silver Age, goes from 1956 to 1970. The Bronze Age follows and spans from 1970 to 1985. Finally the last period, from c. 1985 until today, is the Modern Age. This division is standard but not all the critics apply it, since some of them propose their own periods, and the dates selected may vary depending on the authors.

The first recorded use of the term "Golden Age" pertaining to comics was by Richard A. Lupoff in an article, "Re-Birth", published in issue one of the fanzine Comic Art in April 1960. The first use of the terms "Golden Age" and "Silver Age" together as comic periodization was in a letter from a reader published in Justice League of America #42 (February 1966) that stated: "If you guys keep bringing back the heroes from the Golden Age, people 20 years from now will be calling this decade the Silver Sixties!" Comics historian/movie producer Michael Uslan says this natural hierarchy of gold–silver–bronze, akin to Olympic medals, soon took hold in common parlance: "Fans immediately glommed onto this, refining it more directly into a Silver Age version of the Golden Age. Very soon, it was in our vernacular, replacing such expressions as ... 'Second Heroic Age of Comics' or 'The Modern Age' of comics. It wasn't long before dealers were ... specifying it was a Golden Age comic for sale or a Silver Age comic for sale."

==== Alternative schemes ====
In A Complete History of American Comic Books, Shirrel Rhoades cites Steve Geppi (the publisher of the Overstreet Comic Book Price Guide and founder of Diamond Comic Distributors, the direct market distribution monopoly between 1997 and 2020) who, taking into account comic strips, divides the history of comics in ages: Victorian (Victorian Age, from 1828 to 1882), of platinum (Platinum Age, from 1882 to 1938), of gold (Golden Age, from 1938 to 1945), atomic (Atom Age, from 1946 to 1956), of silver (Silver Age, from 1956 to 1971), of bronze (Bronze Age, from 1971 to 1985), of copper (Copper Age, from 1986 to 1992), of chrome (Chrome Age, from 1992 to 1999), and modern (Modern Age, 2000 to present). According to Rhoades, consideration of comic strips in the general history of comics has led Geppi to add two periods before the Golden Age: the Victorian Age (from 1828 to 1882) and the Platinum Age (the period of comic strips).

Alternative definitions of these periods exist, as comics historian William W. Savage sets the ending of the Atom Age (the period in which there was a prevalence of atomic-bomb narratives and horror stories) in 1954, the year that the Comics Code Authority prohibited most of what had appeared prior to 1954. The website Copper Age Comics proposes that the Copper Age began in 1984 with Marvel's Secret Wars limited series and ended in 1991 with Jim Lee's X-Men series. In 1992, a group of Marvel artists (including Jim Lee) defected to form the creator-owned Image Comics; the site marks this as the beginning of the Modern Age, which continues to the present.

In analytic circles, in contexts of retrospection, due to the term "Modern Age" becoming increasingly confusing, being harder to distinguish the older comics from those of contemporary ages, it is often proposed to rename the Modern Age, also known as the period after the mid-1980s. An alternative name for the period after the mid-1980s is the Dark Age of Comic Books. Pop culture writer Matthew J. Theriault proposed the Dark Age (c. 1985 to 2004), the Modern Age (beginning c. 2004 with the publication of Marvel's "Avengers Disassembled" and DC Comics' "Infinite Crisis", and ending c. 2011), and the Postmodern Age (beginning c. 2011 with the publication of Ultimate Fallout #4, the first appearance of Miles Morales, and continuing to the present). While comic historians often use the term 'Modern Age', internet comic communities frequently use the term 'Iron Age' to define the period between the mid-1980s (marked by DC Comics's Crisis on Infinite Earths event) and 2011 (marked by the DC Comics's "Infinite Crisis" event and the New 52 reboot); this essentially combines Theriault's interpretation of the Dark Age with his Modern Age. This term arose organically within online spaces to distinguish the dark, grim-and-gritty era from later digital eras.

Comics creator Tom Pinchuk proposed the name Diamond Age (2000–present) for the period starting with the appearance of Marvel's Ultimate line.

== Early ==
=== Victorian Age (1842–1897) ===
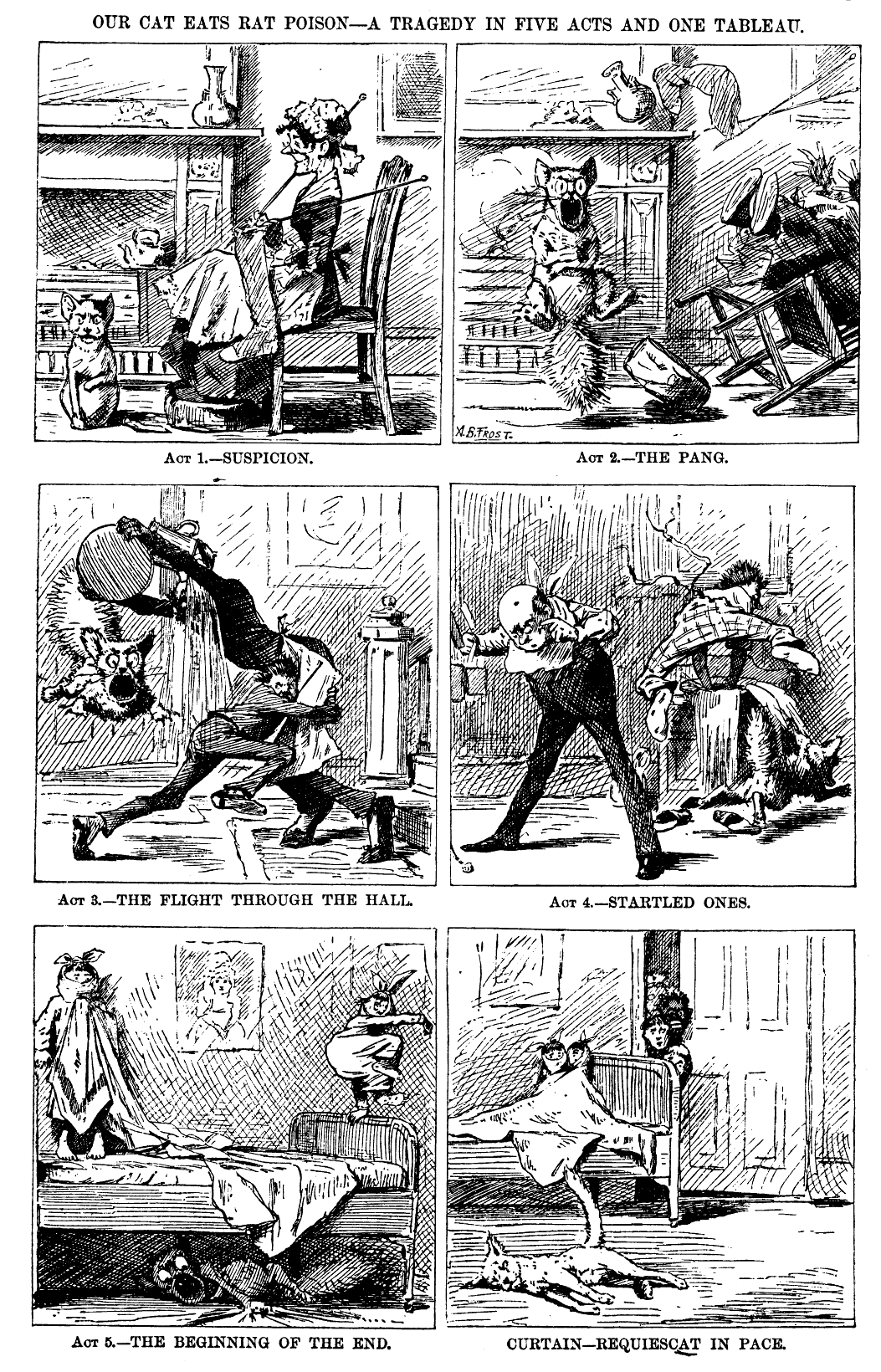
A tale of Arthur Burdett Frost dated 1881.

Comics in the United States originated in the early European works. In 1842, the work Histoire de Mr. Vieux Bois by Rodolphe Töpffer was published under the title The Adventures of Mr. Obadiah Oldbuck in the U.S. This edition (a newspaper supplement titled Brother Jonathan Extra No. IX, September 14, 1842) was an unlicensed copy of the original work as it was done without Töpffer's authorization. This first publication was followed by other works of this author, always under types of unlicensed editions. Töpffer comics were reprinted regularly until the late 1870s, which gave American artists the idea to produce similar works. In 1849, Journey to the Gold Diggins by Jeremiah Saddlebags by James A. and Donald F. Read was the first American comic.

Domestic production remained limited until the emergence of satirical magazines that, on the model of British Punch, published drawings and humorous short stories, but also stories in pictures and silent comics. The three main titles were Puck, Judge and Life. Authors such as Arthur Burdett Frost created stories as innovative as those produced in the same period by Europeans. However, these magazines only reached an audience educated and rich enough to afford them. The arrival of new printing techniques, along with other technologies, allowed easy and cheap reproduction of images for the American comic to take off. Some media moguls like William Randolph Hearst and Joseph Pulitzer engaged in a fierce competition, publishing cartoons in their newspapers in an attempt to attract readers.

=== Platinum Age (1897–1938) ===
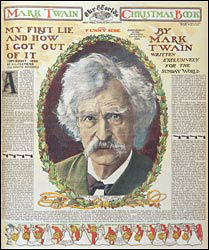
Cover of the New York World, owned by Joseph Pulitzer, Christmas 1899.

The period of the late 19th century (the so-called "Platinum Age") was characterized by a gradual introduction of the key elements of the American mass comics. Then, the funnies were found in the humor pages of newspapers: they were published in the Sunday edition to retain readership. Indeed, it was not the information given that distinguished the newspapers but the editorials and the pages which were not informative, whose illustrations were an important component. These pages were then called comic supplement. In 1892, William Randolph Hearst published cartoons in his first newspaper, The San Francisco Examiner. James Swinnerton created on this occasion the first drawings of humanized animals in the series Little Bears and Tykes. Nevertheless, drawings published in the press were rather a series of humorous independent cartoons occupying a full page. The purpose of the cartoon itself, as expressed through narrative sequence expressed through images which follow one another, was only imposed slowly.

In 1894, Joseph Pulitzer published in the New York World the first color strip, designed by Walt McDougall, showing that the technique already enabled this kind of publications. Authors began to create recurring characters. Thus, in 1894 and still in the New York World, Richard F. Outcault presented Hogan's Alley, created shortly before in the magazine Truth. In this series of full-page large drawings teeming with humorous details, he staged street urchins, one of whom was wearing a blue nightgown (which turned yellow in 1895). Soon, the little character became the darling of readers who called him Yellow Kid. On October 25, 1896, the Yellow Kid pronounced his first words in a speech balloon (they were previously written on his shirt). Outcault had already used this method but this date is often considered as the birth of comics in the United States.

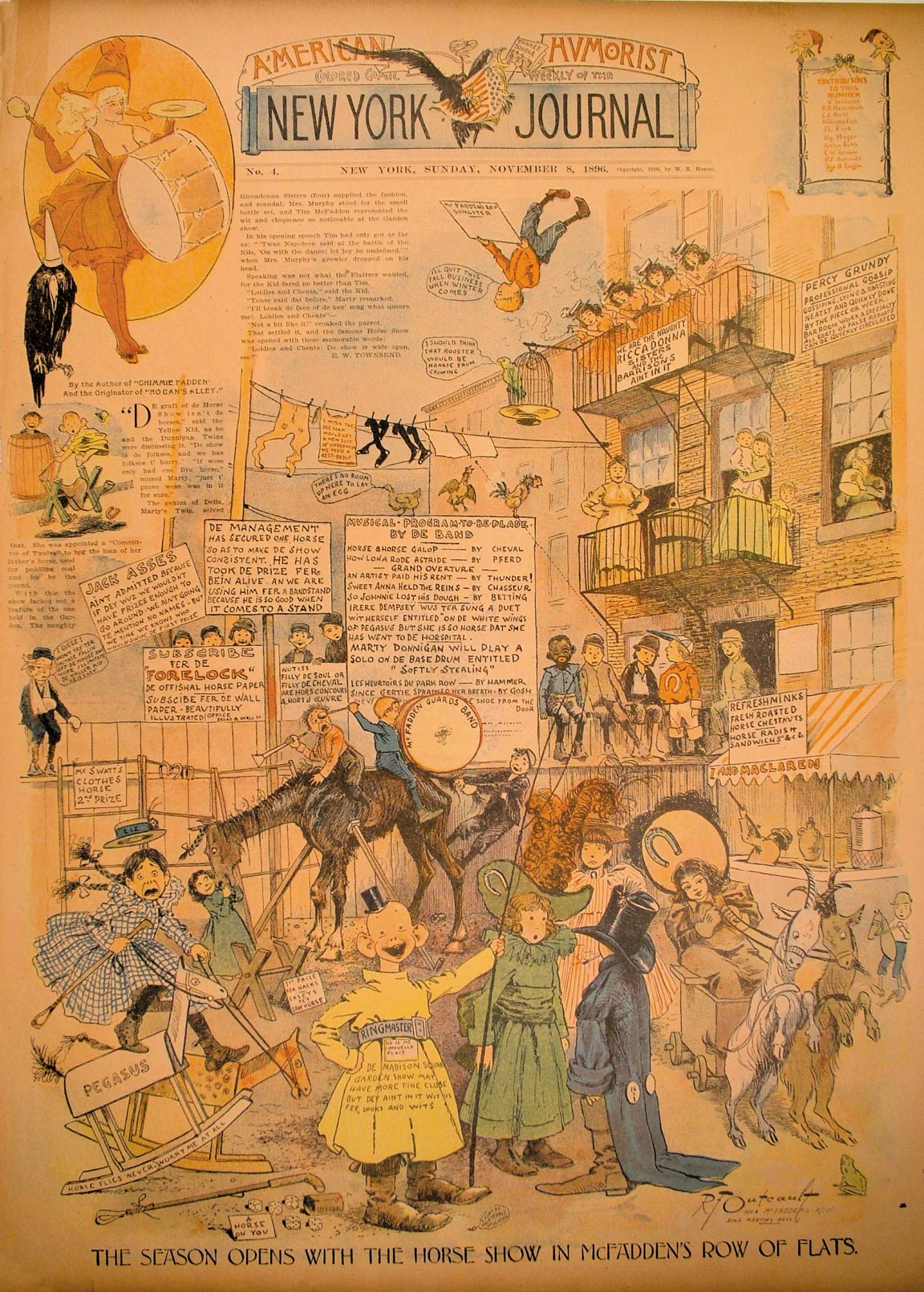
The Yellow Kid published in the New York Journal from 8 November 1896.

Yellow Kid's success boosted sales of the New York World, fueling the greed of Hearst. Fierce competition between Hearst and Pulitzer in 1896 led to enticing away of Outcault by Hearst to work in the New York Journal. A bitter legal battle allowed Pulitzer to keep publishing Hogan's Alley (which he entrusted to Georges B. Luks) and Hearst to publish the series under another name. Richard Outcault chose the title The Yellow Kid. Published in 1897, the Yellow Kid magazine consisting of sheets previously appeared in newspapers and it was the first magazine of its kind.

From 1903 to 1905, Gustave Verbeek wrote his comic series The Upside-Downs of Old Man Muffaroo and Little Lady Lovekins.

== Classic ==
=== Golden Age (1938–1956) ===
The Golden Age of Comic Books describes an era of American comic books from 1938 to 1956. During this time, modern comic books were first published and rapidly increased in popularity. The superhero archetype was created and many well-known characters were introduced, including Superman, Batman, Captain Marvel, Captain America, The Human Torch and Wonder Woman.

=== Silver Age (1956–1970) ===
The Silver Age of Comic Books began with the publication of DC Comics' Showcase #4 (Oct. 1956), which introduced the modern version of the Flash. At the time, only three superheroes—Superman, Batman, and Wonder Woman—were still published under their own titles. The Comics Code was a dominating force during the Silver Age. The Code restricted many topics from being covered in stories: this prevented certain genres, such as crime and horror comics, from being sold at most comic book shops, and also helped superheroes stay popular and culturally relevant. The underground comix movement began at the end of the Silver Age in response to the restrictions of the Code, and was part of the broader counterculture of the 1960s.

=== Bronze Age (1970–1985) ===
The Bronze Age of Comic Books is an informal name for a period in the history of American superhero comic books usually said to run from 1970 to 1985. It follows the Silver Age of Comic Books and is followed by the Modern Age of Comic Books. The Bronze Age retained many of the conventions of the Silver Age, with traditional superhero titles remaining the mainstay of the industry. However, a return of darker plot elements and storylines more related to relevant social issues, such as racism, began to flourish during the period, prefiguring the later Modern Age of Comic Books.

== Modern ==
The Modern Age of Comic Books is a period in the history of American superhero comic books which is generally considered to have begun in 1985 and continues through the present day. During approximately the first 15 years of this period, many comic book characters were redesigned, creators gained prominence in the industry, independent comics flourished, and larger publishing houses became more commercialized. An alternative name for this period is the Dark Age of Comic Books, due to the popularity and artistic influence of titles with serious content, such as Batman: The Dark Knight Returns and Watchmen.

== See also ==
- Comic Book Superheroes Unmasked
- History of comics
- List of years in comics
- Table of years in comics
- Ages of Man, from Ancient Greek mythology, which introduced the idea of "Golden Age", "Silver Age", and "Bronze Age"

== Bibliography ==
- Baron-Carvais, Annie (1994). La Bande dessinée (in French) (4th ed.). Paris: Presses Universitaires de France. p. 127. ISBN 978-2130437628.
- Booker, M. Keith, ed. (2010). Encyclopedia of Comic Books and Graphic Novels. Santa Barbara, California: ABC-Clio. p. 763. ISBN 978-0-313-35746-6.
- Cooke, Jon B.; Roach, David, eds. (2001). Warren Companion: The Ultimate Reference Guide. TwoMorrows Publishing. p. 272. ISBN 9781893905085.
- Courtial, Gérard; Faur, Jean-Claude (1985). À la rencontre des super-héros (in French). Marseille: Bédésup. p. 152. OCLC 420605740.
- DiPaolo, Marc (2011). War, Politics and Superheroes. Ethics and Propaganda in Comics and Film. Jefferson, N.C.: McFarland. p. 330. ISBN 9780786447183. OCLC 689522306.
- Duncan, Randy; Smith, Matthew J. (2009). The Power of Comics: History, Form & Culture. New York: Continuum. ISBN 978-0826429360. OCLC 231585586.
- Dupuis, Dominique (2005). Au début était le jaune: une histoire subjective de la bande dessinée (in French). Paris: PLG. ISBN 9782952272902. OCLC 74312669.
- Estren, Mark James (1974). A History of Underground Comics (1st ed.). San Francisco, CA: Straight Arrow Books. ISBN 978-0879320751.
- Filippini, Henri (2005). Dictionnaire de la bande dessinée (in French). Paris: Bordas. p. 912. ISBN 9782047320839.
- Gabilliet, Jean-Paul (2010). Of Comics and Men. A Cultural History of American Comic Books. Jackson, Miss.: University Press of Mississippi. p. 390. ISBN 9781604732672. OCLC 276816625.
- Harvey, Robert C. (2009). "How Comics Came to Be". In Heer, Jeet; Worcester, Kent (eds.). A Comics Studies Reader. Jackson, Miss.: University Press of Mississippi. ISBN 9781604731095.
- Harvey, Robert C. (1994). The Art of the Funnies. An Aesthetic History. Jackson, Miss.: University Press of Mississippi. p. 252. ISBN 9780878056743.
- Kaplan, Arie (2008). From Krakow to Krypton. Jews and Comic Books. Philadelphia: The Jewish Publication Society. ISBN 978-0-8276-0843-6. OCLC 191207851.
- Misiroglu, Gina; Roach, David A., eds. (2004). The Superhero Book. The Ultimate Encyclopedia Of Comic-Book Icons And Hollywood Heroes. Detroit: Visible Ink Press. pp. 725. ISBN 1578591546.
- Nyberg, Amy Kiste (1998). Seal of Approval. The History of the Comics Code. Jackson, Miss.: University Press of Mississippi. p. 224. ISBN 9781578591541.
- Rhoades, Shirrel (2008). A Complete History of American Comic Books. New York: Peter Lang. p. 353. ISBN 978-1433101076. OCLC 175290005.
- Rubis, Florian (March 2012). "Comics From the Crypt to the Top: Panorama des comics en français". DBD (in French) (61). ISSN 1951-4050.
- Ryall, Chris; Tipton, Scott (2009). Comic Books 101. The History, Methods and Madness. Cincinnati, Ohio: Impact. p. 288. ISBN 9781600611872. OCLC 233931259.
- Sanders, Joe Sutcliff (2010). The Rise of the American Comics Artist. Creators and Contexts. Jackson, Miss.: University Press of Mississippi. p. 253. ISBN 9781604737929.
- Thorne, Amy (2010). "Webcomics and Libraries". In Weiner, Robert G. (ed.). Graphic Novels and Comics in Libraries and Archives. Essays on Readers, Research, History and Cataloging. Jefferson, N.C.: McFarland. ISBN 9780786456932. OCLC 630541381.
- Woods Robert, Virginia (2001). "Comic strips". In Browne, Ray Broadus; Browne, Pat (eds.). The Guide to United States Popular Culture. Bowling Green, OH: Bowling Green State University Popular Press. ISBN 9780879728212. OCLC 44573365.
- Wright, Bradford W. (2003). Comic Book Nation. The Transformation of Youth Culture in America. Baltimore, Md.; London: Johns Hopkins University Press. p. 360. ISBN 9780801874505. OCLC 53175529.
