= American comics =

American comics may refer to:

- History of American comics
- American comic book
