= William Giles Baxter =

British cartoonist and illustrator

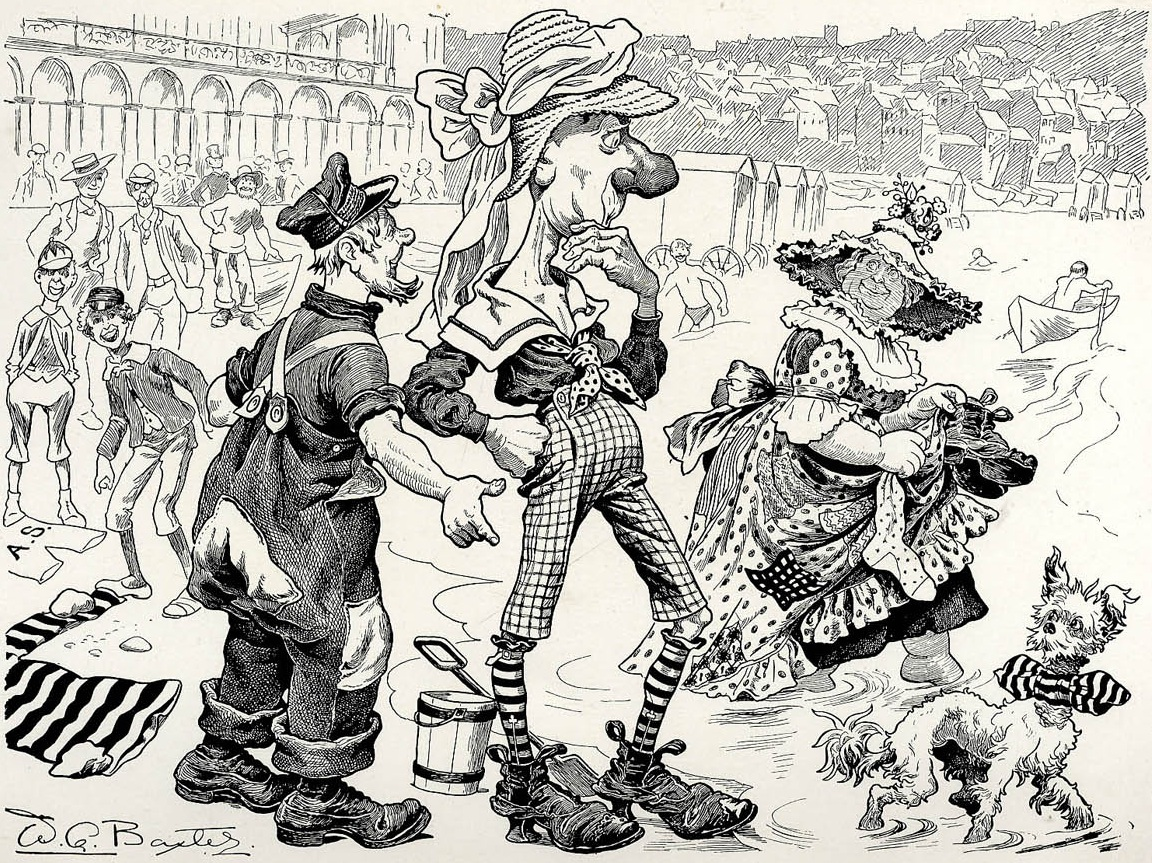
Drawing of Ally Sloper from the middle of the 1880s.

William Giles Baxter (1856–1888) was a British cartoonist and illustrator. His most noted work, from 1884 until his death, was for the weekly comic Ally Sloper's Half Holiday.

Baxter had previously worked for the Manchester-based satiric magazine Momus/Comus before joining the staff at Judy, whose editor, Charles Henry Ross, had created Ally Sloper, considered the first comic hero, in 1867. When Ross sold the rights to Gilbert Dalziel, Baxter was taken on to further develop the character. After his death, the illustrations were continued by W. F. Thomas.
