= Sor Pampurio =

Italian comic strip

Publication information
- Format: Text comics
- Genre: Humor/comedy

Creative team
- Created by: Carlo Bisi

Sor Pampurio is an Italian comic strip series created by Carlo Bisi (1929-1978).

28th July 1929 comic.

== Background ==
Started in 1929, the comic strips were published, with some breaks, by Il Corriere dei Piccoli until 1978. Every episode starts depicting Sor Pampurio ("Mr. Pampurio")'s happiness about his new house, a happiness that turns in a few frames, for a reason or another, in an increasing discontent and in a new moving at the end of any story.

The comic strip received some very different critical interpretations: during the years it was accused of being an uncritical adhesion of fascist values or marked as "bourgeois comics", while on the contrary other critics considered the comics positively as a slight parody of bourgeois values, a symbolic critic to the rampant consumerism and a reflection about the inability to achieve happiness through material values.
