= Modern Age of Comic Books =

Era of American comic books (1985–present)

- Time span: 1985 – present

Related periods
- Preceded by: Bronze Age of Comic Books (1970–1985)

The Modern Age of Comic Books is a disputed period in the history of American superhero comic books which is considered to have begun in 1985 and continue into the present day. During approximately the first 15 years of this period, many comic book characters were redesigned, creators gained prominence in the industry, independent comics flourished, and larger publishing houses became more commercialized.

A common alternative name for this period is the Dark Age of Comic Books, due to the popularity and artistic influence of titles with serious content, such as Batman: The Dark Knight Returns and Watchmen.

The Modern Age is often split into different sections. The first, lasting from 1985 to about the late 90s is usually labelled as the Dark Age.

The next Age begins around the turn of the millennium and lasts until the early 2010s.

Comics scholar Adrienne Resha has proposed calling the current period of comic books the Blue Age, which started in the early 2010s, citing the influence of digital readers, guided-reading platforms, and social media.
