= Ally Sloper =

British comic strip character

- Panels from the illustrated story Some of the Mysteries of Loan and Discount, featuring Ally Sloper and (not pictured) Iky Mo; from UK magazine Judy (1867).

Publication information
- Format: Text comics
- Genre: Humor
- Publication date: 1867

Creative team
- Written by: Charles H. Ross
- Artist: Émilie de Tessier

Alexander "Ally" Sloper is the eponymous fictional character of the British comic strip Ally Sloper. First appearing in 1867, he is one of the earliest characters in comic strips.

Red-nosed and blustery, an archetypal lazy schemer often found "sloping" through alleys to avoid his landlord and other creditors, he was created for the British magazine Judy by writer and fledgling artist Charles H. Ross, and inked and later fully illustrated by his French wife Émilie de Tessier under the pseudonym "Marie Duval" (or "Marie Du Val"; sources differ).

The strips, which used text narrative beneath unbordered panels, premiered in the 14 August 1867 issue of Judy, a humour-magazine rival of the famous Punch. The highly popular character was spun off into his own comic, Ally Sloper's Half Holiday, in 1884.

== Artists ==
The first illustrations were by Ross, then Tessier took over. When publisher Gilbert Dalziel re-launched the cartoon as Ally Sloper's Half Holiday, in 1884, Sloper was illustrated by William Baxter until his death in 1888. He was succeeded by W. Fletcher Thomas, who continued the illustrations until approximately 1899, when the publisher invited C. H. Chapman to illustrate the series until it ended in 1916.

== Films ==
19th-century issue of Ally Sloper's Half Holiday

Sloper appeared in three feature films and a wide array of merchandising from pocket watches to door stops. His popularity and influence led to his being used on occasion as a propaganda tool for the British government's policies. Sloper has also been cited as an influence on W. C. Fields and Charlie Chaplin's "little tramp" character and its imitators.

The arrival of the First World War in 1914 saw severe paper rationing, and in 1916 the Half Holiday comic ceased production. Attempts after the war to revive Sloper proved short-lived, as Sloper was a somewhat stereotypical Victorian and Edwardian type, and did not fit into the new post-war world.

== See also ==
- The Adventures of Obadiah Oldbuck, a character in newspaper comics created in 1827
- The Yellow Kid
- Ally Sloper Award
