= Truth (magazine) =

American publication of the 19th and 20th centuries

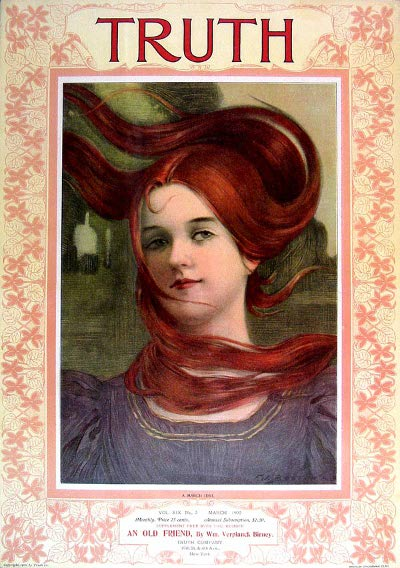
- March 1900 cover, Volume XIX no. 3
- Editor: Blakely Hall
- Frequency: Weekly to monthly
- Founded: 1881
- Final issue: 1905
- Country: United States

Truth magazine was both a weekly magazine and a monthly reader published from 1881 until 1905 in the United States. Its subtitle was "The Brightest of Weeklies".

The publication was founded in 1881 as a society journal. It was on hiatus from 1884 until 1886, and was revamped starting in 1891 under new editor Blakely Hall, who spiced up the publication by adding more pictures of women to its pages, more social satire, and color. Circulation grew to 50,000 subscribers at that point.

Originally a weekly, it transitioned to a monthly publication in 1898, among other numerous changes the publication regularly underwent to its contents and size. It ceased publication in 1905.

== Contributors ==
A non-exhaustive list of notable contributors to Truth includes:

- Stephen Crane, published several short stories
- George Luks, illustrator, over 234 drawings published between 1891 and 1894.
- Rose O'Neill, illustrator
- Richard F. Outcault, creator of The Yellow Kid comic strip, and whose character first appeared as a minor character in Truth
