= Judy (satirical magazine) =

British satirical magazine, 1867–1907

Judy; or the London Serio-Comic Journal
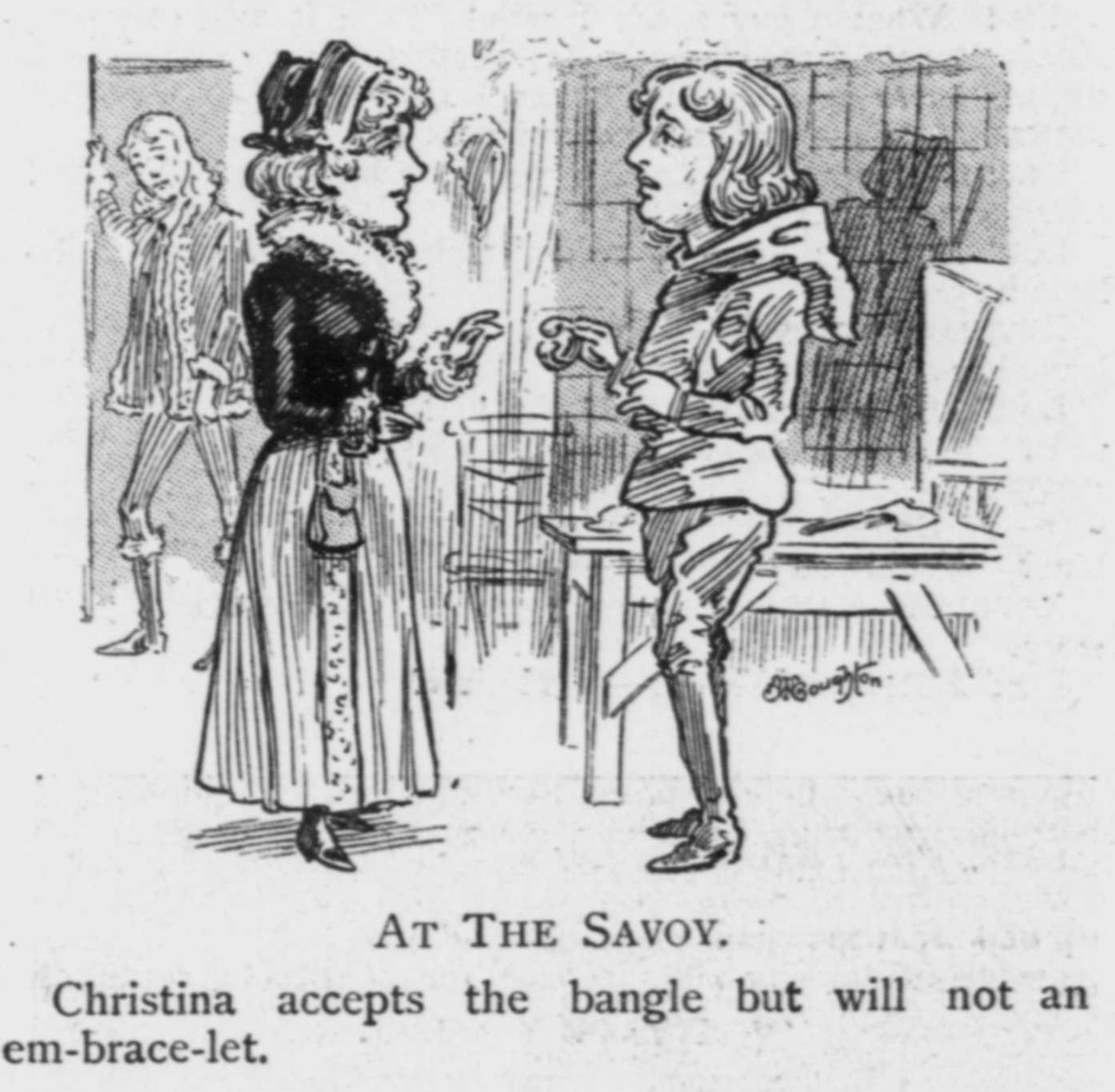
- Drawing from November 27, 1901, issue of Judy
- Editor: Charles Henry Ross
- Frequency: Weekly
- Format: Humour
- Publisher: Gilbert Dalziel
- First issue: 1 May 1867
- Final issue: 23 October 1907
- Country: United Kingdom
- Language: English

Judy was a British satirical humour magazine of the late 19th and early 20th centuries. The full name was Judy; or the London Serio-Comic Journal.

The magazine's first issue was cover dated 1 May 1867, and the last issue 23 October 1907. The name "Judy" was in reference to Punch and Judy, and alluded directly to its more established rival, Punch magazine, which had been founded in 1841.

In its 14 August 1867, issue, Judy introduced "Ally Sloper", who was one of the first – possibly the first – recurring comic strip characters (the seminal Yellow Kid, for instance, was not published until almost three decades later, in 1895). Sloper was later the first comic strip character to get his own regular weekly magazine, Ally Sloper's Half Holiday, the first issue having a cover date of May 3, 1884. Sloper was heavily merchandised, and may have been the first comic strip character featured in a popular song ("Ally Sloper's Christmas Holidays", 1886) or adapted to film (1898).

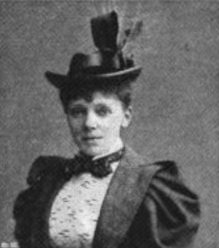
Gillian Debenham

In September 1895, Gilbert Dalziel sold the magazine to Gillian Debenham. She became its literary editor, with R. A. Brownlie acting as art editor.

== Notable contributors ==
- William H. Boucher, illustrator (Boucher also illustrated Robert Louis Stevenson's The Black Arrow and Kidnapped for their first appearances in Young Folks)
- Alfred Bryan, illustrator
- Adelaide Claxton, illustrator
- John Proctor, illustrator
- Charles Henry Ross, editor and writer
