= Ally Sloper's Half Holiday =

British comics magazine

- 19th-century issue of the British comic magazine Ally Sloper's Half Holiday

Publication information
- Publisher: Gilbert Dalziel
- Format: weekly
- Genre: Humor/comedy
- Publication date: 3 May 1884 – 9 September 1916
- No. of issues: 1,679
- Main character: Ally Sloper

Ally Sloper's Half Holiday was a British comics magazine, first published on 3 May 1884. It is regarded to be the first comic strip magazine to feature a recurring character. Star Ally Sloper, a blustery, lazy schemer often found "sloping" through alleys to avoid his landlord and other creditors, had debuted in 1867 in the satirical magazine Judy – created by writer and fledgling artist Charles Henry Ross and inked and later fully illustrated by his French wife Émilie de Tessier under the pseudonym "Marie Duval" (or "Marie Du Val"; sources differ).

The "half holiday" referred to in the title was the practice in Victorian Britain of allowing the workers home at lunchtime on a Saturday, a practice that also established the kick-off times of football matches.

== Publication history ==
The black-and-white weekly comic paper Ally Sloper's Half Holiday, typically of eight tabloid pages and priced one penny, was first published on 3 May 1884, a short time after Ross had sold the rights to the character to Gilbert Dalziel, an engraver and the publisher of Judy. Initially launching the paper with proprietor W. J. Sinkins, Dalziel was soon in full control, publishing it from "The Sloperies", 99 Shoe Lane, EC. Alongside the strips featuring Sloper, the magazine also featured prose stories and cartoons and strips of other characters.

Sales of the magazine have been estimated as being as high as 350,000, the magazine describing itself as "the largest selling paper in the world". The paper found a mixed audience: aimed at adults, it captured both a loyal working class, male base, as well as attracting a cult following amongst the middle class of the time.

Although the weekly initially ceased publication on 9 September 1916, after 1,679 issues, it was later revived between 5 November 1922 and 14 April 1923, and again from 1948 to 1949, each attempt failing to capture the imagination of the British public as the original once had.

In 2001, a copy of the first issue of Ally Sloper's Half Holiday fetched £3,600 at an English auction house.

== Contributors ==
William Giles Baxter took over art duties for the Sloper character with issue 13.

William Fletcher Thomas became the artist on the Ally Sloper strips following Baxter's death in 1888.

James Gibbins contributed his expertise in the field of handwriting, a skill he put forward to the police at the time of the Jack the Ripper murders, offering to analyse items thought to be authored by the Ripper.

Thomas Burke contributed stories.

During 1908 C. H. Chapman illustrated the Ally Sloper character. Chapman was better known as the artist that drew Billy Bunter from 1911 until The Magnet folded in 1940. He continued to illustrate Billy Bunter in books through the 1950s.

== Influence ==
Ally Sloper's Half Holiday is widely cited as being the first comic book or magazine to feature a regular character, and is also often cited as the first comic as well. It helped establish the financial viability of the medium and codified the British form to an extent visible many years later in publications such as Viz.

== Alan Class' Ally Sloper magazine ==
Alan Class Comics published four issues of Ally Sloper magazine in 1976–1977. Edited by comics historian Denis Gifford, Ally Sloper demonstrated great affection for old British comics, comic strips, and artists. With the cover tagline, "First British comic hero 1867, First British comic magazine 1976," Ally Sloper contained an eclectic mix of strips and articles. Some were in the style of British comic strips from the early 20th century, while others were created by classic artists such as Frank Hampson's "Dawn O'Dare" and Frank Bellamy, who provided Swade, a three-page black-and-white wordless western story, for issue #1 (his last work, as he died before completing the second strip). Also featured were newer British artists such as Kevin O'Neill (issue #2) and Hunt Emerson (issue #4).

Although the Alley Sloper comic magazine was critically acclaimed by the fan press, it suffered from poor distribution and insufficient public interest, and the title disappeared from the market after only four issues.
