= Rodolphe Töpffer =

Swiss teacher, author, painter, cartoonist, and caricature artist (1799–1846)

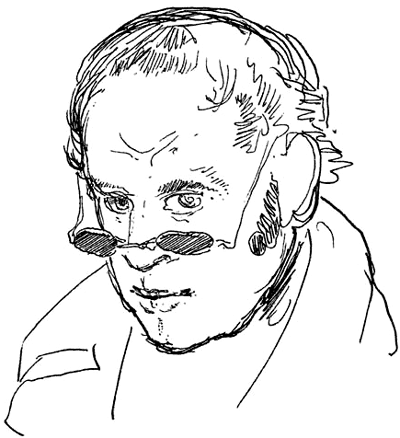
- Self-portrait of Rodolphe Töpffer (1840)
- Born: 31 January 1799; Geneva, Léman, France (now Switzerland)
- Died: 8 June 1846 (aged 47); Geneva, Restored Swiss Confederation (now Switzerland)
- Occupations: Cartoonist; Author; Painter
- Known for: Credited with being the first comics artist

Rodolphe Töpffer (/ˈtɒpfər/ TOP-fər; French: [ʁɔdɔlf tœpfɛʁ]; 31 January 1799 – 8 June 1846) was a Swiss teacher, author, painter, cartoonist, and caricaturist. He is best known for his illustrated books (littérature en estampes, "graphic literature"), which are possibly the earliest European comics. He is known as the father of comic strips and has been credited as the "first comics artist in history."

Paris-educated, Töpffer worked as a schoolteacher at a boarding school, where he entertained students with his caricatures. In 1837, he published Histoire de Mr. Vieux Bois (published in the United States in 1842 as The Adventures of Obadiah Oldbuck). Each page of the book had one to six captioned cartoon panels, much like modern comics. Töpffer published several more of these books, and wrote theoretical essays on the form.

== Biography ==
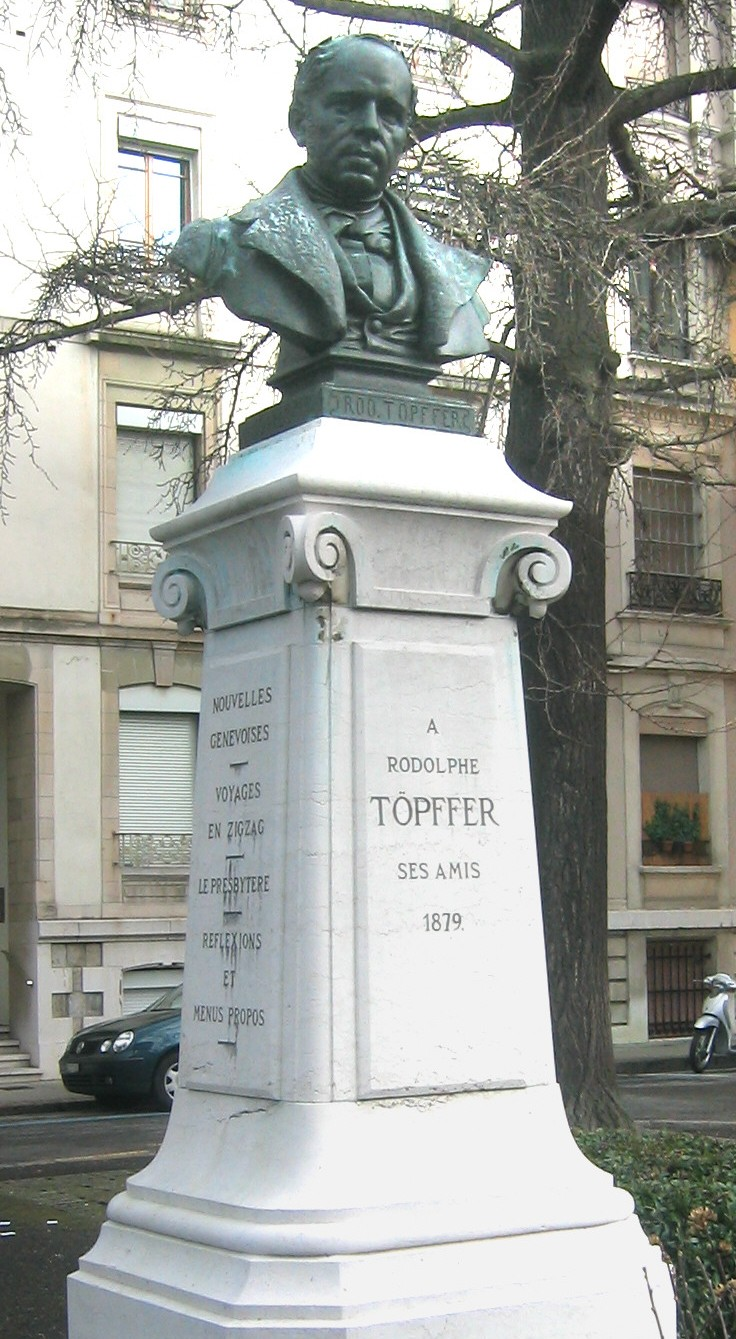
Töpffer Monument in Geneva

Töpffer was born on 12 pluviôse of the seventh year of the French Republican calendar at ten hours after noon (« dix heures après midi »), that is on 31 January 1799, in Geneva, Léman, France. His father Wolfgang-Adam Töpffer was a painter and occasional caricaturist. His grandfather, Georg-Christoph, a master tailor, had come from Franconia and held a sock factory in Geneva. Töpffer was educated in Paris from 1819 to 1820, then returned to Geneva and became a school teacher. Töpffer followed education to Paris from 1819 to 1820, in pursuit of joining his father’s side as a gifted painter. However, declining eyesight forced his return back to Geneva, and eventually became a school teacher. By 1823, he established his own boarding school for boys. In 1832, he was appointed Professor of Literature at the University of Geneva.

Relatively successful in his profession, Töpffer gained fame from activities he pursued in his spare time. He painted local landscapes in a style considered influenced by contemporary Romanticism. He wrote short stories and entertained his students by drawing caricatures. He collected these caricatures in books; the first of them, Histoire de Mr. Vieux Bois (The Story of Mr. Wooden Head), was completed by 1827 but not published until 1837. It was 30 pages, each containing one to six captioned panels. It was translated and republished in the United States in 1842 as The Adventures of Obadiah Oldbuck. The stories were reproduced by autography, a variation of lithography that allowed him to draw on specially prepared paper with a pen. The process allowed for a loose line, and was quicker and freer than the more common engraving process.

== Publications ==
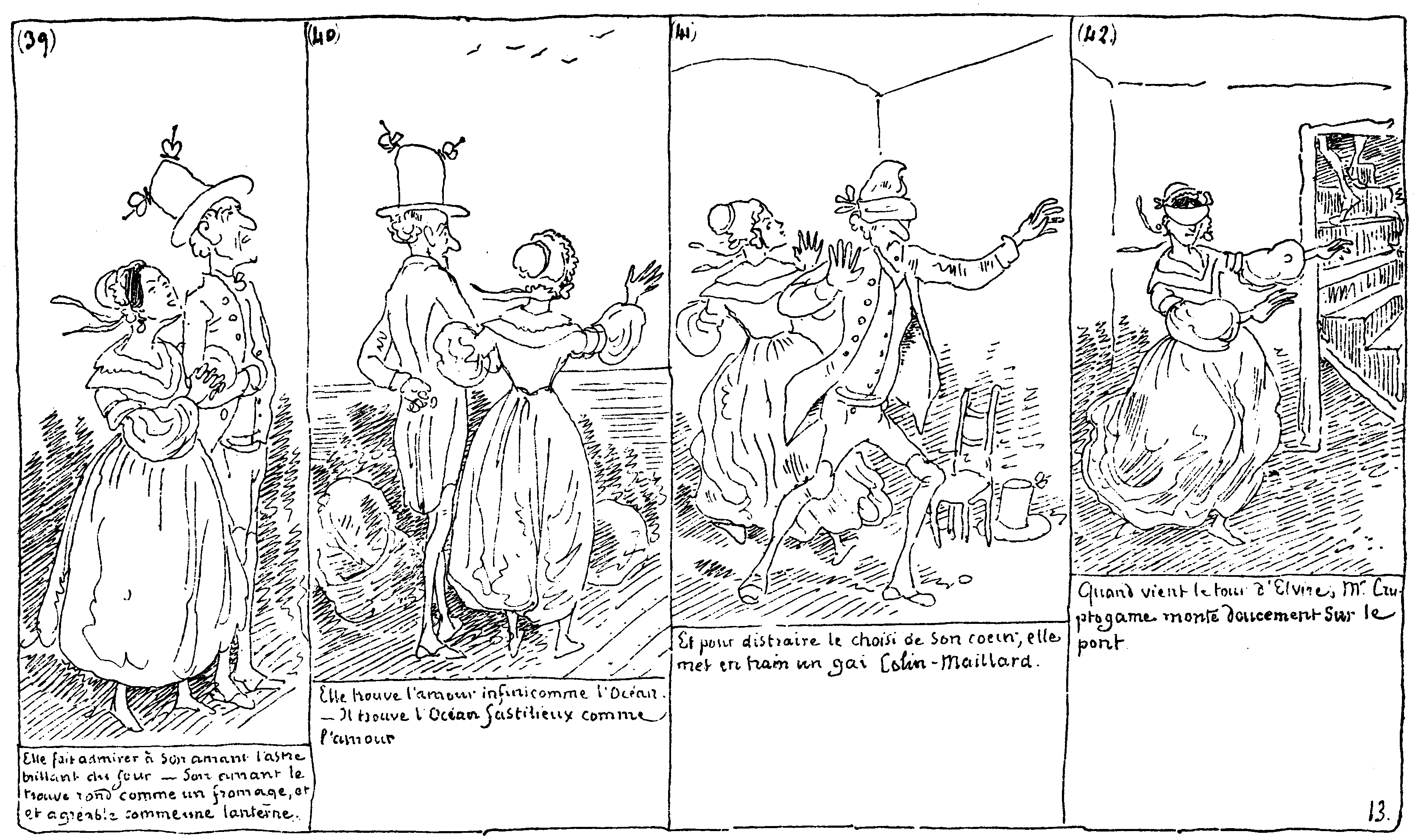
Sample of his artwork

The comedic story was not originally intended for publication, but Töpffer continued to create others in his spare time to entertain his acquaintances. Notable among them was Johann Wolfgang von Goethe who in 1831 persuaded Töpffer to publish his stories. Seven of them were eventually published in newspaper form across Europe, but Goethe would not live to see them.

- Histoire de Mr. Jabot – created 1831, first published 1833. It features the adventures of a middle class dandy who attempts to enter the contemporary upper class.
- Monsieur Crépin – first published in 1837. It features the adventures of a father who employs a series of tutors for his children and falls prey to their eccentricities.
- Histoire de Mr. Vieux Bois – created 1827, first published 1837. The above-mentioned story.
- Monsieur Pencil – created 1831, first published 1840. An escalating series of events beginning with an artist losing his sketch to the blowing wind and almost resulting in a global war.
- Histoire d'Albert – first published in 1845. The adventures of an inexperienced young man in search of a career. After many attempts he ends up as a journalist in support of radical ideas. The panels show the erection of barricades and crowds singing La Marseillaise.
- Histoire de Monsieur Cryptogame – first published in 1845. The story of a lepidopterist who goes to great lengths to replace his current lover with a more suitable one.
- Le Docteur Festus (or Voyages et aventures du Docteur Festus) – created 1831, first published 1846. A scientist wanders the world, offering his assistance. He is blissfully unaware that disaster marks his path.

All seven are considered satirical views of 19th century society and proved popular at the time. In 1842, Töpffer published Essais d'autographie.

On 14 September 1842, the Histoire de Mr. Vieux Bois was first introduced to a United States audience as The Adventures of Mr. Obadiah Oldbuck. It was published in comic book form as a supplement to that day's edition of Brother Jonathan, a New York City newspaper edited by author John Neal. It has come to be considered the first American comic book and, according to several Robert Beerbohm articles published in Comic Art and the Overstreet Comic Book Price Guide, the inspiration for an entire U.S. genre of nineteenth-century graphic novel.

The University Press of Mississippi published an English translation of his full-length stories as well as previously unpublished works in 2007.

Töpffer is considered alternatively the father or at least an important precursor to the modern art form of comics. He is also considered to be an influence on younger comics artists such as Wilhelm Busch, creator of Max and Moritz.

== Child art ==
Töpffer wrote two chapters on child art and child creativity in his book Reflections et menus propos d'un peintre genevois (1848), which was published after his death. He wrote that children often displayed greater creativity than trained artists, whose creativity was often overshadowed by their technical skill.

== See also ==
- Picture story
