= Marie Duval =

British cartoonist

- Born: Isabelle Émilie de Tessier; 25 September 1847 London, England
- Died: 11 June 1890 London, England
- Area: Cartoonist
- Pseudonyms: Princess Hesse Schwartzbourg, Ambrose Clarke, Noir
- Notable works: Ally Sloper
- Spouse: Charles Henry Ross

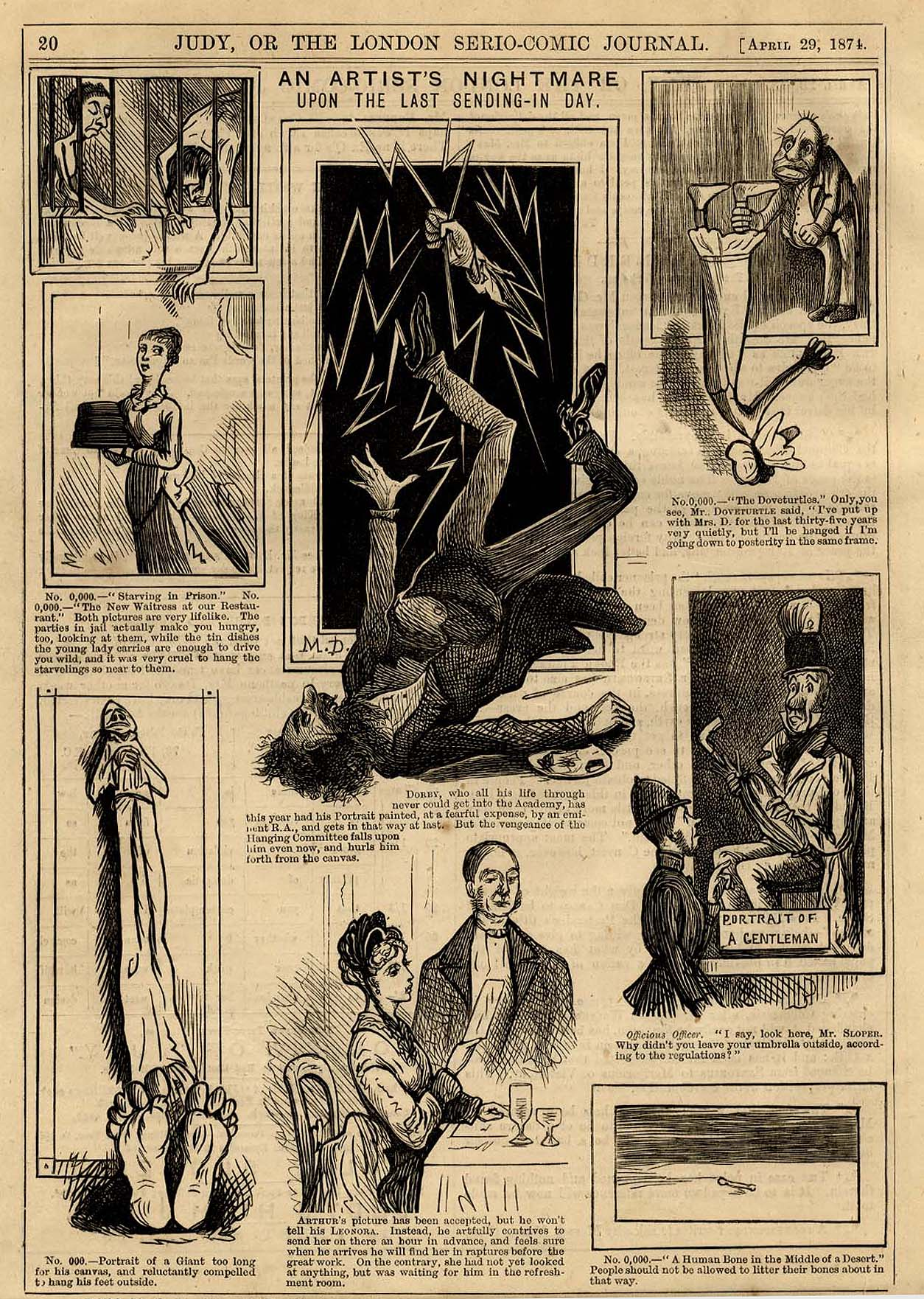
Marie Duval, 'An Artist's Nightmare Upon the Last Sending-in Day'. Judy, 29 April 1874 (vol 15, p. 20), Catalogue No. 220074, Guildhall Library.

Isabelle Émilie de Tessier (25 September 1847 – 11 June 1890), who worked under the pseudonyms Marie Duval and Ambrose Clarke, was a British cartoonist, known as co-creator of the seminal cartoon character Ally Sloper, the popular character was spun off into his own comic, Ally Sloper's Half Holiday, in 1884.

== Early life and career ==
Isabelle Emily Louisa Tessier was born in London on 25 September 1847 to parents of French descent. She initially became a governess but left to become an actor.

Her first known appearance on stage was at the St James's Theatre in 1868 when she was in a pantomime. She adopted the stage name Marie Duval, and appeared in plays written by Charles Henry Ross.

== Career as a cartoonist ==
In 1869, Duval joined three other women cartoonists contributing to the British satirical magazine Judy, edited by Ross, signing her work as Marie Duval. She also provided illustrations to Ross's 1869 novel The Story of a Honeymoon, using the pseudonym Ambrose Clarke.

The Ally Sloper character had been created for Judy by Ross in 1867. By 1869, the strips were signed by Duval and Ross. Afterwards, Duval became the strip's primary illustrator, assuming creative responsibility for the character. In 1884, the new comic publication, Ally Sloper's Half Holiday, began publication, reprinting Duval's comic strips without her signature.

She contributed to Judy until 1885, and was at times generating over 100 contributions to the magazine each year. This included spot illustrations, cartoons and full-page comic strips. Her work also appeared in British penny papers and comics from the 1860s to the 1880s.

Duval was the author of Queens and Kings and Other Things (1874), a collection of illustrated nonsense verse published under the pseudonym of "S. A. the Princess Hesse Schwartzbourg". She also co-wrote Rattletrap Rhymes and Tootletum Tales: a Big Book for Babies (1876) with Ross, using the pseudonym Ambrose Clarke.

== Personal life ==
In 1871, Duval had an affair with Herbert Augustus Such, and was a correspondent in the high profile divorce case brought by his wife in 1873.

In 1874, Duval had a child with Charles Henry Ross, and the family lived in Battersea. She adopted the name Ross but there are no records of a marriage.

Duval died of bronchitis, pneumonia and nephritis on 11 June 1890 in Clapham. She was buried in Wandsworth Cemetery as Isabella E Ross.

== Sources ==
- Ally Sloper Don Markstein's Toonopedia
- Ally Sloper Andy's Early Comics Archive
