= The Yellow Kid =

American comic strip character

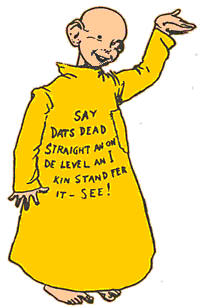
- The Yellow Kid

Publication information
- Publisher: Joseph Pulitzer's New York World; William Randolph Hearst's New York Journal
- First appearance: 17 February 1895
- Created by: Richard F. Outcault

In-story information
- Full name: Mickey Dugan

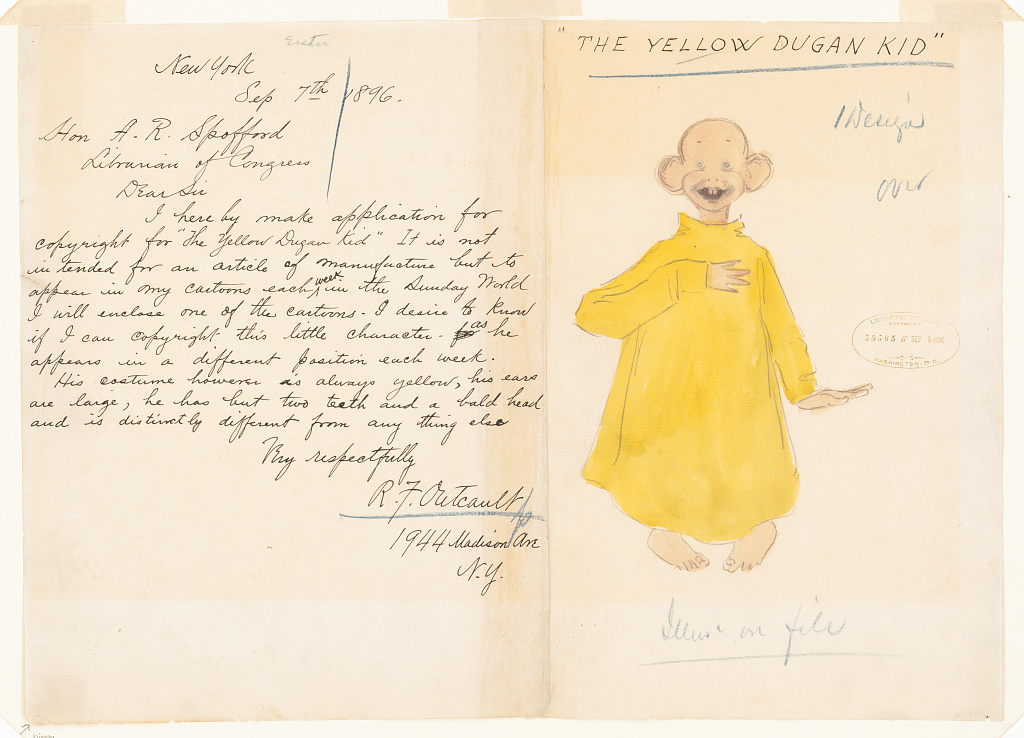
Handwritten claim for copyright on "The Yellow Dugan Kid" to the Librarian of Congress on September 7, 1896

The Yellow Kid (Mickey Dugan) is an American comic-strip character that appeared from 1895 to 1898 in Joseph Pulitzer's New York World, and later William Randolph Hearst's New York Journal. Created and drawn by Richard F. Outcault in the comic strip Hogan's Alley (and later under other names as well), the strip was one of the first Sunday supplement comic strips in an American newspaper, although its graphical layout had already been thoroughly established in political and other, purely-for-entertainment cartoons. Outcault's use of word balloons in The Yellow Kid influenced the basic appearance and use of balloons in subsequent newspaper comic strips and comic books.

The Yellow Kid is also famous for its connection to the coining of the term "yellow journalism". The idea of "yellow journalism" referred to stories that were sensationalized for the sake of selling papers, and was so named after the "Yellow Kid" cartoons. Through his cartoons, Outcault's work aimed his humor and social commentary at Pulitzer's adult readership. The strip has been described as "a turn-of-the-century theater of the city, in which class and racial tensions of the new urban, consumerist environment were acted out by a mischievous group of New York City kids from the wrong side of the tracks".

== Character ==
The Yellow Kid was not an individual but a type. When I used to go about the slums on newspaper assignments I would encounter him often, wandering out of doorways or sitting down on dirty doorsteps. I always loved the Kid. He had a sweet character and a sunny disposition, and was generous to a fault. Malice, envy or selfishness were not traits of his, and he never lost his temper.
— Richard F. Outcault, from a 1902 interview

The Yellow Kid was a bald, snaggle-toothed, barefoot boy who wore an oversized yellow nightshirt and hung around in a slum alley typical of certain areas of squalor that existed in late 19th-century New York City. Hogan's Alley was filled with equally odd characters, mostly other children. With a goofy grin, the Kid habitually spoke in a ragged, peculiar slang, which was printed on his shirt, a device meant to lampoon advertising billboards.

The Yellow Kid's head was drawn wholly shaved, as if recently having been ridden of lice, a common sight among children in New York's tenement ghettos at the time. His nightshirt, a hand-me-down from an older sister, was white or pale blue in the first color strips.

== Publication history ==
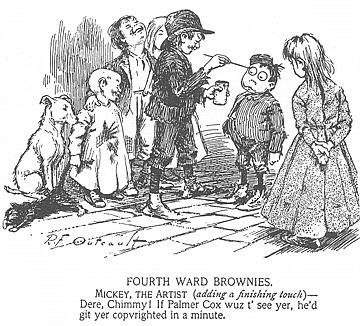
Richard F. Outcault's last Hogan's Alley cartoon for Truth magazine, Fourth Ward Brownies, was published on 9 February 1895 and reprinted in the New York World newspaper on 17 February 1895, beginning one of the first comic strips in an American newspaper. The character later known as the Yellow Kid had minor supporting roles in the strip's early panels. This one refers to The Brownies characters popularized in books and magazines by artist Palmer Cox.

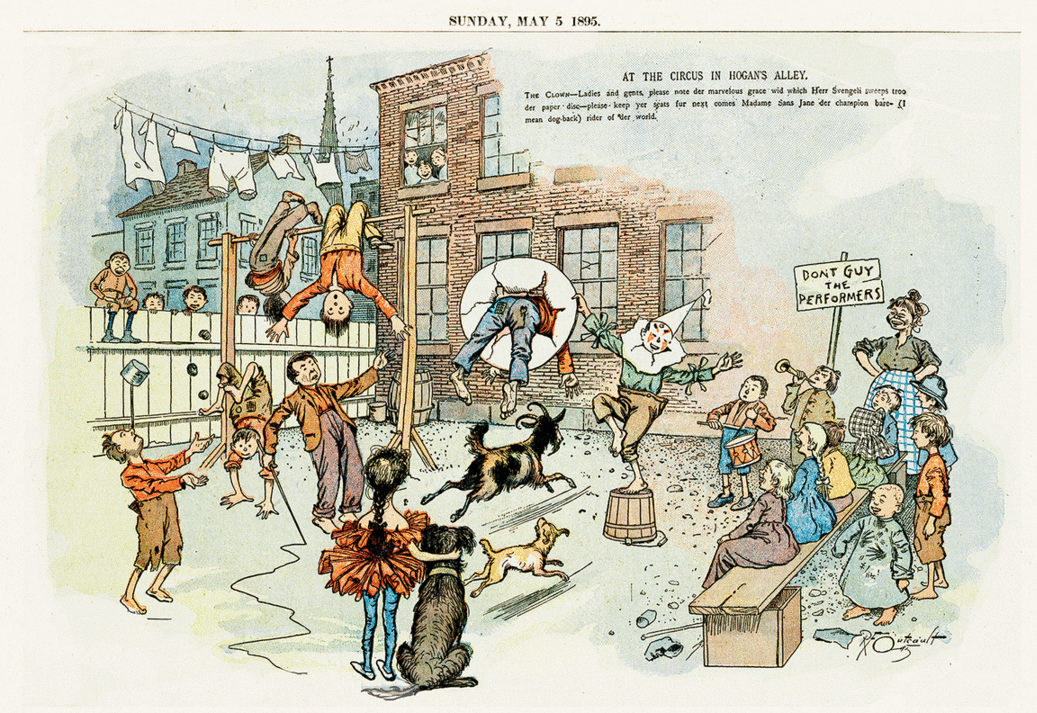
A May 1895 New York World appearance of the character (lower right, above Outcault's signature) who, here, is not yet wearing yellow.

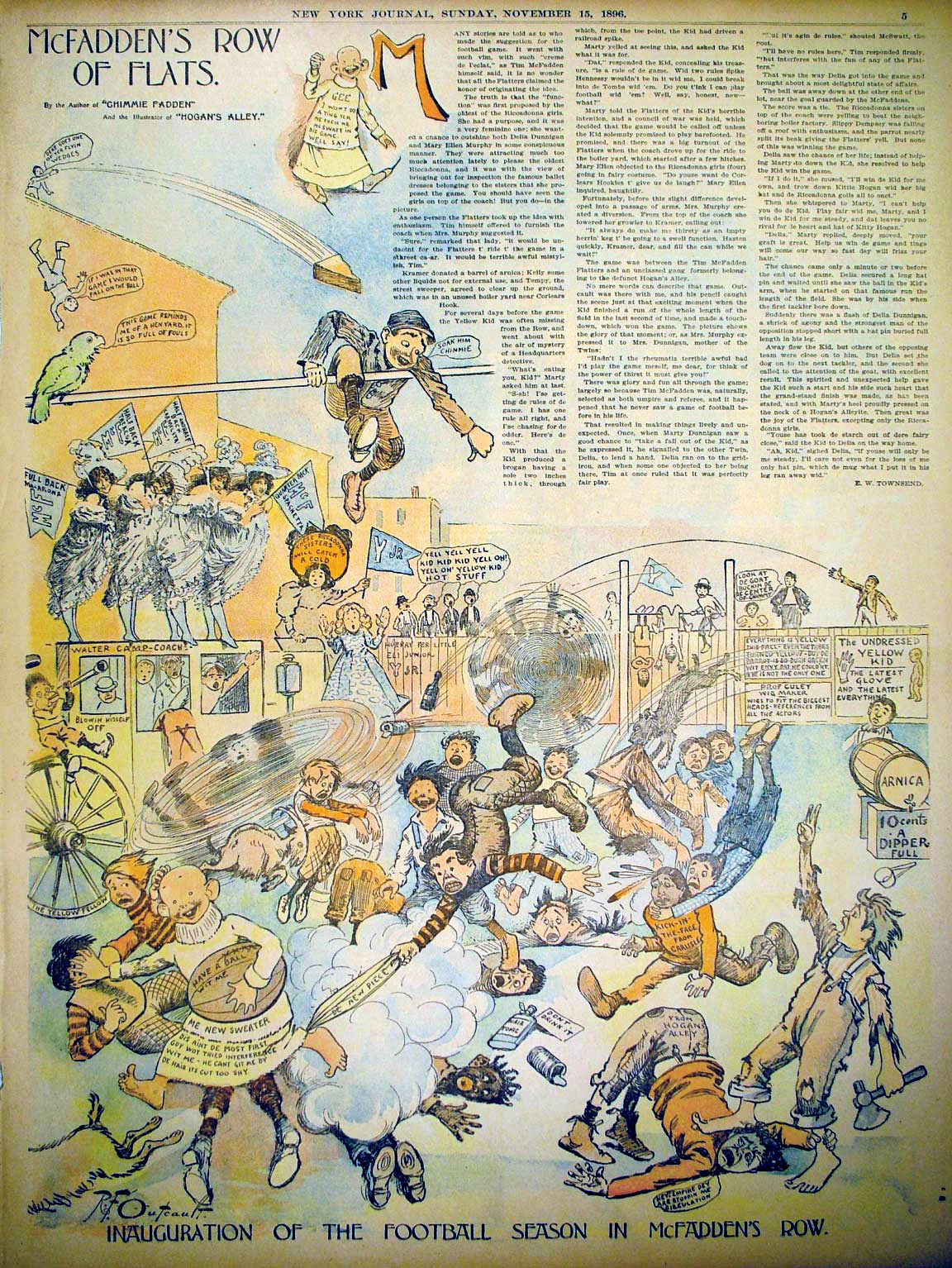
A year and a half later, Outcault was drawing the Yellow Kid for Hearst's New York Journal in a full-page color Sunday supplement as McFadden's Row of Flats. In this 15 November 1896 Sunday panel, word balloons have appeared, the action is openly violent and the drawing has become mixed and chaotic.

The character who would later become the Yellow Kid first appeared on the scene in a minor supporting role in a single-panel cartoon published in the strip Feudal Pride in Hogan's Alley on 2 June 1894 in Truth magazine. There were a few more Hogan's Alley cartoons featuring the Hogan's Alley kids over the rest of 1894 and the beginning of 1895. The four different black-and-white single-panel cartoons were deemed popular, and one of them, Fourth Ward Brownies, was reprinted on 17 February 1895 in Joseph Pulitzer's New York World, where Outcault worked as a technical drawing artist. The World published another, newer Hogan's Alley cartoon less than a month later, and this was followed by the strip's first color printing on 5 May 1895. Hogan's Alley gradually became a full-page Sunday color cartoon with the Yellow Kid (who was also appearing several times a week) as its lead character.

In 1896, Outcault was hired away at a much higher salary to William Randolph Hearst's New York Journal where he drew the Yellow Kid in a new full-page color strip which was significantly violent and even vulgar compared to his first panels for Truth magazine. Because Outcault failed in his attempt to copyright the Yellow Kid, Pulitzer was able to hire George Luks to continue drawing the original (and now less popular) version of the strip for the World and hence the Yellow Kid appeared simultaneously in two competing papers for about a year. Luks's version of the Yellow Kid introduced a pair of twins, Alex and George, also dressed in yellow nightshirts. Outcault produced three subsequent series of Yellow Kid strips at the Journal, each lasting no more than four months:

- McFadden's Row of Flats (18 October 1896 – 10 January 1897)
- Around the World with the Yellow Kid – a strip that sent the Kid on a world tour in the manner of Nellie Bly (17 January – 30 May 1897)
- A half-page strip which eventually adopted the title Ryan's Arcade (28 September 1897 – 23 January 1898).

Publication of both versions stopped abruptly after only three years in early 1898, as circulation wars between the rival papers dwindled. Moreover, Outcault may have lost interest in the character when he realized he could not retain exclusive commercial control over it. The Yellow Kid's last appearance is most often noted as 23 January 1898 in a strip about hair tonic. On 1 May 1898, the character was featured in a rather satirical cartoon called Casey Corner Kids Dime Museum but he was drawn as a bearded, balding old man wearing a green nightshirt which bore the words: "Gosh I've growed old in making dis collection."

The Yellow Kid appeared sporadically in Outcault's later cartoon strips, most notably Buster Brown.

== Yellow journalism ==
The two newspapers that ran the Yellow Kid, Pulitzer's World and Hearst's Journal, quickly became known as the yellow kid papers. This was contracted to the yellow papers and the term yellow kid journalism was at last shortened to yellow journalism, describing the two newspapers' editorial practices of taking (sometimes even fictionalized) sensationalism and profit as priorities in journalism.

== Merchandising ==
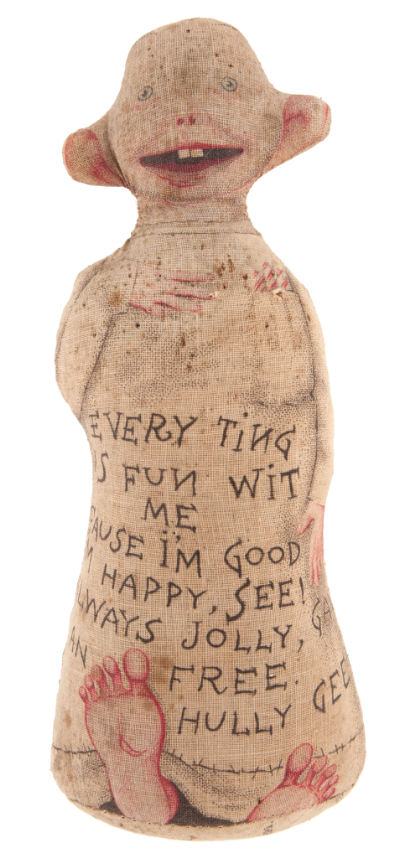
A stuffed doll of the character, c. 1899

The Yellow Kid's image was an early example of lucrative merchandising and appeared on mass market retail objects in the greater New York City area such as "billboards, buttons, cigarette packs, cigars, cracker tins, ladies' fans, matchbooks, postcards, chewing gum cards, toys, whiskey and many other products". With the Yellow Kid's merchandising success as an advertising icon, the strip came to represent the crass commercial world it had originally lampooned.

== Legacy ==
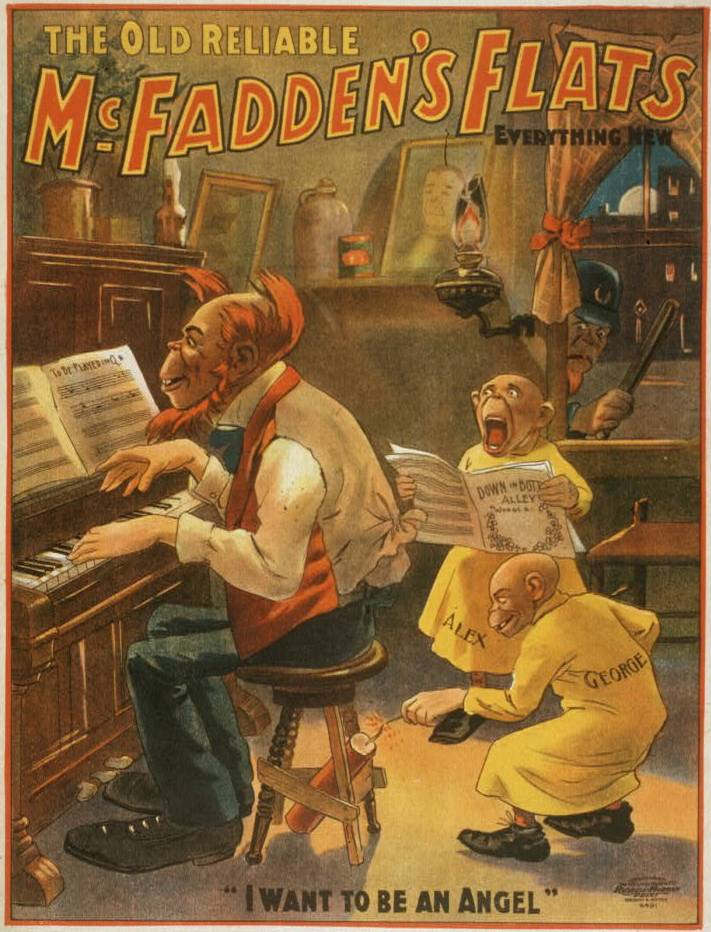
1902 poster for Gus Hill's stage production of McFadden's Flats

Entertainment entrepreneur Gus Hill staged vaudeville plays based on the comic strip. His version of McFadden's Flats was made into films in 1927 and 1935.

The Yellow Kid made an appearance in the Marvel Universe in the Joss Whedon-written Runaways story (volume 2, issue 27). In this take on the character, he exhibits superhuman powers.

In the Ziggy of 16 February 1990, Ziggy points to a smiling old man seated next to him on a park bench and says, "No kidding... You were The Yellow Kid!"

Writer Chris Yambar and editorial cartoonist Randy Bish attempted to revive the series in 2020 as a comic book for the character's 125th anniversary, in which The Yellow Kid is pulled into the modern day by a magician; however, only one issue was published before Yambar's death in March of 2021.

=== Yellow Kid Awards ===
The Yellow Kid Awards are Italian comics awards presented by the Italian International Comics and Cartooning Exhibition and distributed at the annual Italian comic book and gaming convention Lucca Comics & Games.

== See also ==
- Ally Sloper
- Histoire de Mr. Vieux Bois
- Hogan's Alley (magazine)
- Max and Moritz
- The Katzenjammer Kids
- The Little Bears
- Little Nemo
- Platinum Age of Comic Books
