= Charles Henry Ross =

English writer and cartoonist

- Born: 1835
- Died: 12 October 1897 (aged 61–62) Clapham, London, England
- Areas: Cartoonist, Writer, Editor
- Notable works: Ally Sloper
- Spouse: Marie Duval

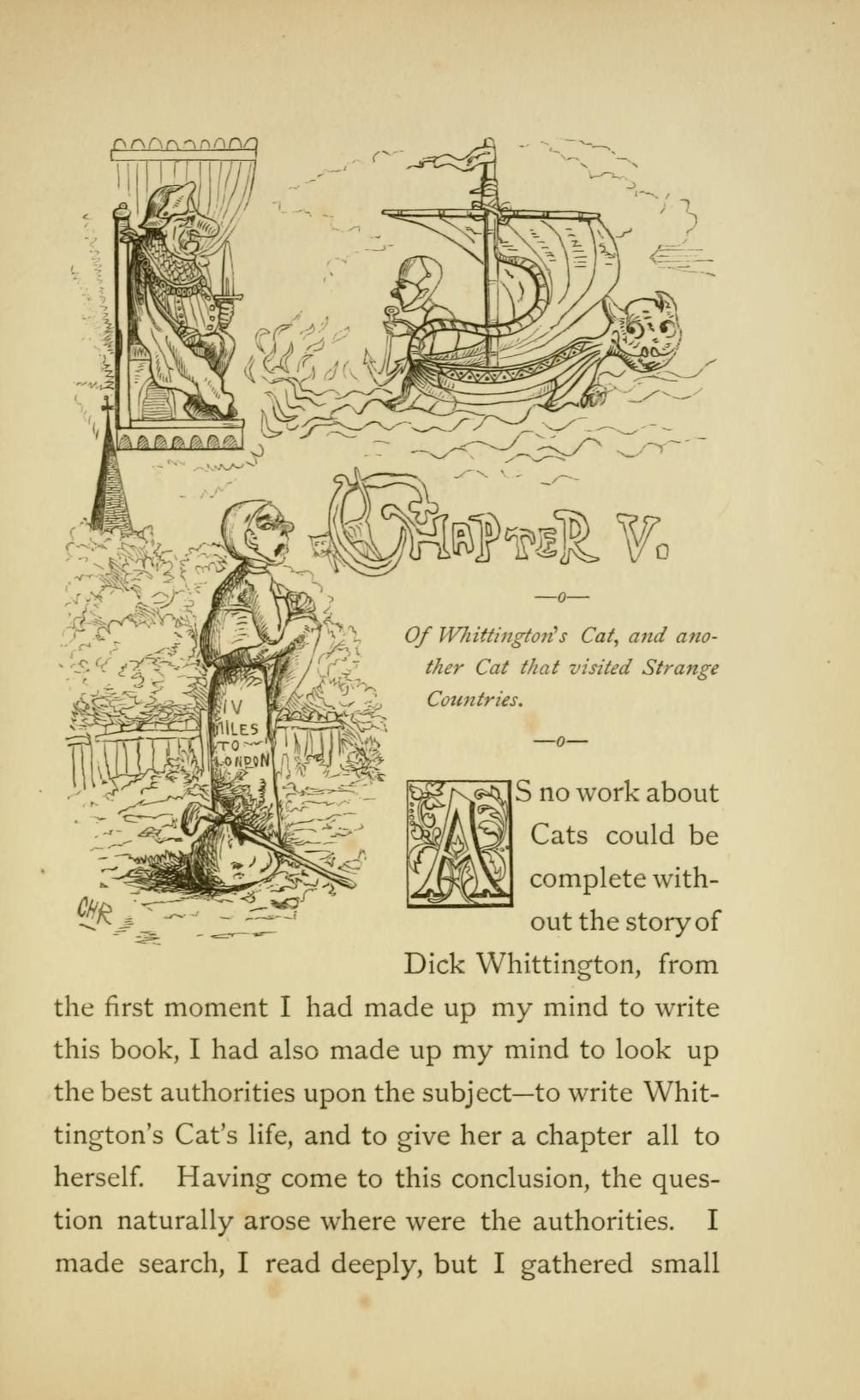
Page 79 of an 1868 Charles Henry Ross' The Book of Cats.

Charles Henry Ross (1835 – 12 October 1897) was an English writer and cartoonist.

== Biography ==
Ross created the fictional character Ally Sloper for the British magazine Judy in 1867, the popular character was spun off into his own comic, Ally Sloper's Half Holiday, in 1884. Ross originally was the illustrator of the character until his French-born wife, under the pseudonym Marie Duval, later took over the illustration. He had a son, Charles.

For a number of years, Ross was the editor of Judy.

He contributed a series of engravings, entitled "A Happy Day in a Varlet's Life. In a Series of Hard Lines", to the Ninth Season (1868) of Beeton's Christmas Annual.

Ross was the author of six novels in genres ranging from Gothic penny dreadfuls to light romances.

He died on 12 October 1897 in Clapham, London.

== Works ==
- The Book of Cats (1868)
