= Richard F. Outcault =

American cartoonist (1863–1928)

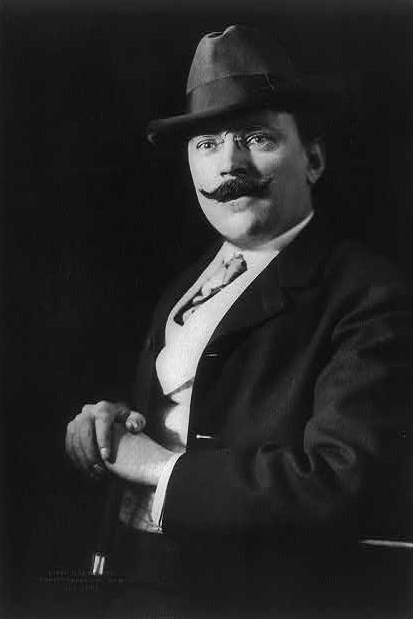
- Outcalt by Pirie MacDonald in 1905
- Born: Richard Felton Outcalt; January 14, 1863 Lancaster, Ohio, U.S.
- Died: September 25, 1928 (aged 65) Flushing, New York, U.S.
- Area: Cartoonist
- Spouse: Mary Jane Martin (m. 1890)
- Children: 2

Richard Felton Outcault (/ˈaʊtkɔːlt/; January 14, 1863 – September 25, 1928) was an American cartoonist. He was the creator of the series The Yellow Kid and Buster Brown and is considered a key pioneer of the modern comic strip.

== Life and career ==
=== Early life and education ===
Outcault was born on January 14, 1863, in Lancaster, Ohio, to Catherine Davis and Jesse P. Outcalt—spelled without the u their son later added. He attended the McMicken School of Design in Cincinnati from 1878 to 1881, and after graduating did commercial painting for the Hall Safe and Lock Company.

=== Early career ===
Outcault painted electric light displays for Edison Laboratories for the 1888 Centennial Exposition of the Ohio Valley and Middle Atlantic States in Cincinnati. This led to full-time work with Edison in West Orange, New Jersey, doing mechanical drawings and illustrations. Edison appointed him official artist for the company's traveling exhibition in 1889–90, which included supervising the installation of Edison exhibits at the Exposition Universelle in Paris. While there, he studied art in the Latin Quarter and added the u to his surname.

In 1890 Outcault returned to the US, married, and moved to Flushing in New York City. He worked making technical drawings to Street Railway Journal and Electrical World, a magazine owned by one of Edison's friends. On the side, he contributed to the humor magazines Truth, Puck, Judge and Life.

=== The Yellow Kid ===
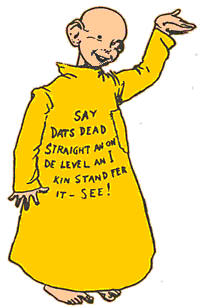
The Yellow Kid

The New York World newspaper began publishing cartoons in 1889. The Chicago Inter Ocean added a color supplement in 1892, the first in the US, and when the World's publisher Joseph Pulitzer saw it, he ordered for his own newspaper the same four-color rotary printing press. A color Sunday humor supplement began to run in the World in Spring 1893. The supplement's editor Morrill Goddard contacted Outcault via Roy McCardell on the staff of Puck and offered Outcault a full-time position with the World. Outcault's first cartoon for the paper appeared on September 16, 1894: a six-panel, full-page comic strip titled "Uncle Eben's Ignorance of the City". Though not the first strips to employ multi-panel narrative strips—even at the World—Outcault's were among the earliest. His primary subjects were African Americans who lived in a town called Possumville and Irish immigrants who lived in tenement slums.

An Outcault cartoon from the June 2, 1894 (in Truth magazine) featured a big-eared, bald street kid in a gown. Outcault continued to draw the character, who made his debut in the World on January 13, 1895. The kid appeared in color for the first time in the May 5 issue in a cartoon titled "At the Circus in Hogan's Alley". Outcault weekly Hogan's Alley cartoons appeared from then on in color, starring rambunctious slum kids in the streets, in particular the bald kid, who gained the name Mickey Dugan. In the January 5 episode of Hogan's Alley, Mickey's gown appeared in bright yellow. He soon became the star of the strip and became known as The Yellow Kid, and that May the Kid's dialogue began appearing on his yellow gown. The strip's popularity drove up the World's circulation and the Kid was widely merchandised. Its level of success drove other papers to publish such strips, and thus the Yellow Kid is seen as a landmark in the development of the comic strip as a mass medium.

Outcault may not have benefited from the strip's merchandise revenue. Though he applied at least three times, he does not appear to have been granted a copyright on the strip. Common practice at the time would have given the publisher the copyrights to the strips they printed on a work-for-hire basis, though not to the characters therein.

California newspaperman William Randolph Hearst set up offices in New York after buying the failing New York Morning Journal, which he renamed the New York Journal. He bought a color press and hired away the World's Sunday supplement staff, including Outcault, at greatly increased salaries. Hearst's color humor supplement was named The American Humorist and advertised as "eight pages of polychromatic effulgence that make the rainbow look like a lead pipe". It debuted on October 18, 1896, and an advertisement in the Journal the day before boasted: "The Yellow Kid—Tomorrow, Tomorrow!" The strip was titled McFadden's Row of Flats, as the World claimed the Hogan's Alley title. A week earlier, on October 11, Outcault's replacement at the World George Luks took over with his own version of Hogan's Alley; he had handled the strip earlier, the first time that May 31. Both papers advertised themselves with posters featuring the Yellow Kid, and soon the association with their sensational style of journalism led to the coining of the term "yellow journalism".

The installment for October 25, 1896—"The Yellow Kid and his New Phonograph"—featured speech balloons for the first time. Outcault's strips appeared twice a week in the Journal, and took on a form that was to become standard: multipanel strips in which the images and text were inextricably bound to each other. Comics historian Bill Blackbeard asserted this made it "nothing less than the first definitive comic strip in history". From January to May 1897, Hearst sent Outcault and the Humorist's editor Rudolph Block to Europe, a trip Outcault reported on in the paper through a mock Yellow Kid diary and an Around the World with the Yellow Kid strip, which took the place of McFadden's Row of Flats.

The Yellow Kid's popularity soon faded, and the last strip appeared on January 23, 1898. Luks' version had ended the month before. The character made rare appearances thereafter. Hearst had launched the New York Evening Journal and made Outcault the editor of the daily comics page. He continued to contribute cartoons to it, as well as to the World, where he had Casey’s Corner published, a strip about African-American characters that debuted on February 13, 1898, and moved to the Evening Journal on April 8, 1898. It was the first newspaper strip to feature continuity.

Outcault freelanced cartoons to other papers in 1899. The Country School and The Barnyard Club ran briefly in The Philadelphia Inquirer. In the New York Herald ran Buddy Tucker, about a bellhop, and Pore Lil Mose, the first strip with an African-American title character—a prankster portrayed in a heavily stereotyped manner.

=== Buster Brown ===
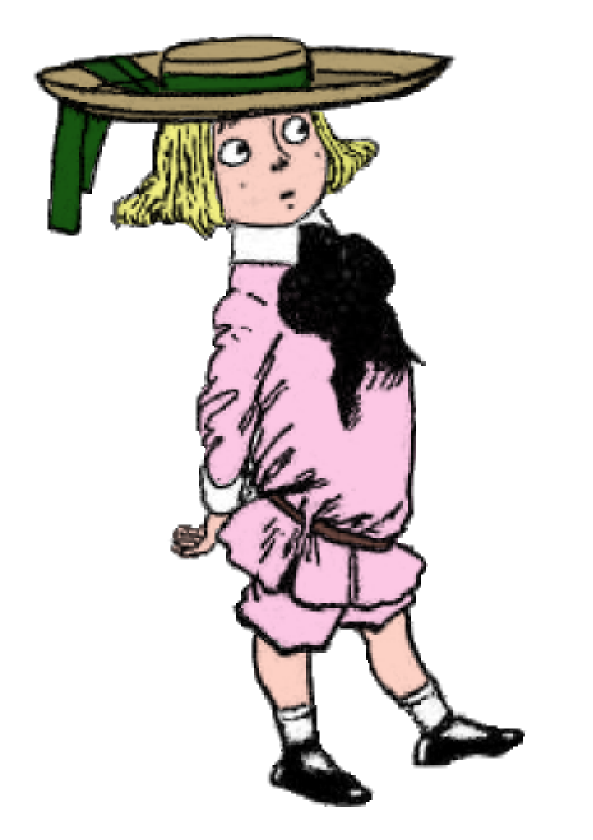
Buster Brown

Outcault introduced Buster Brown to the pages of the Herald on May 4, 1902, about a mischievous, well-to-do boy dressed in Little Lord Fauntleroy style, and his pit-bull terrier Tige. The strip and characters were more popular than the Yellow Kid, and Outcault licensed the name for a wide number of consumer products, such as children's shoes from the Brown Shoe Company. In 1904 Outcault sold advertising licenses to 200 companies at the Louisiana Purchase Exposition. Journalist Roy McCardell reported in 1905 that Outcault earned $75,000 a year from merchandising and employed two secretaries and a lawyer.

At the Herald, Outcault worked alongside fellow comic strip pioneer Winsor McCay (who at that point was mostly working on illustrations and editorial cartoons). A rivalry built up between the two cartoonists, which resulted in Outcault leaving the Herald to return to his previous employer, William Randolph Hearst at The New York Journal. In the Journal, Outcault began using multiple panels and speech balloons following the earlier examples of Frederick Burr Opper and Rudolph Dirks.

Outcault took Buster Brown to Hearst's New York American in January 1906. The Herald continued to publish Buster Brown strips by other cartoonists; Outcault sued, and the Herald countersued the American's publishers for the character's trademark.

Outcault had not applied for a copyright to Buster Brown, but asserted a "common-law title"—what comics historian Don Markstein asserted is one of the earliest claims to creators' rights. The court decided the Herald owned the Buster Brown name and title and the copyright on the strips it published, but the characters themselves were too intangible to qualify for copyright or trademark. Nonetheless a later court case established that Outcault owned all other rights to Buster Brown. This freed Outcault to continue the strip in the American as long as he did not use the Buster Brown name. (Note: Many sources erroneously assert this case was over the Yellow Kid; no records exist of a lawsuit over the Yellow Kid. But Meyer, drawing on Gordon (1998, p. 32) reproduces W. B. Howell, Assistant Secretary, Treasury Department, to W. Y. Connor, New York Journal, April 15, 1897, reprinted in Decisions of the Notes to United States Courts involving Copyright and Literary Property, 1789-1909, Bulletin 15 (Washington, D.G.: Library of Congress, 1980), pp. 3187-88, which shows that the Treasury Department made a legal determination)

Outcault continued the untitled Buster Brown strip until 1921, though increasingly the work was done by assistants. He focused rather on merchandising, and set up an advertising agency in Chicago at 208 South Dearborn Street to handle it. In 1914 he proposed unsuccessfully a Buster Brown League for boys too young to join the Boy Scouts.

Outcault retired from newspapers and spent the last ten years of his life painting. After a ten-week illness he died on September 25, 1928, in Flushing, New York. His widow later interred his ashes at the Forest Lawn Memorial Park Cemetery in Glendale, California.

== Personal life ==
Outcault married Mary Jane Martin, the granddaughter of a Lancaster banker, on Christmas Day 1890. The couple had two children.

== Legacy ==
- Comics historian R. C. Harvey considered "that Outcault belongs in the ranks of the great cartoonists".
- Outcault was a 2008 Judges' Choice inductee into the Will Eisner Comic Book Hall of Fame.
- Lancaster High School in Lancaster, Ohio (Outcault's birthplace) awards the R. F. Outcault Innovation Award to journalism students annually. Betsy Noll (2011) was the first recipient, Riley Theiss and Ohio State and Harvard Linebacker Luke Roberts were the 2012 recipients, Jeremy Hill & Alek LaVeck were the 2013 co-recipients, and Connor McCandlish received the honor in 2014.
- A street in Edison, New Jersey, Outcalt Road, is named in his honor.
- Outcault is widely credited as one of the inventors of the modern comic strip format, having pioneered the use of multi-panel sequential storytelling, speech balloons, and recurring characters in newspaper comics. The Yellow Kid is considered one of the first comic strips to achieve mass-media status, with its popularity directly contributing to the rise of yellow journalism as both a style and a term.
- The Buster Brown brand became one of the earliest examples of systematic comic strip merchandising in American history. Outcault's licensing strategy — selling the Buster Brown name to over 200 companies at the 1904 Louisiana Purchase Exposition — established a template for character merchandising that predated Walt Disney's similar approach by decades.
