= Before 1900s in comics =

This is a timeline of significant events in comics prior to the 20th century.

== 15th century ==
=== 1450–1516 ===
- Life of Dutch painter Hieronymus Bosch, who paints various paintings with sequential narratives which can be considered prototypical comics (The Seven Deadly Sins and the Four Last Things, Death and the Miser, The Garden of Earthly Delights, The Haywain Triptych, The Last Judgment, Triptych of the Temptation of St. Anthony, Hell and the Flood).

=== 1494 ===
- Hans Holbein the Elder paints the Grey Passion, which will be finished in 1500. The work depicts the life of Jesus in a sequential illustrated narrative.

=== 1499 ===
- Hans Holbein the Elder paints the Epitaph der Schwestern Vetter, depicting Jesus' life and death in a sequential illustrated narrative.

== 16th century ==
=== 1502 ===
- Hans Holbein the Elder paints the Kaisheim Altarpiece, depicting 16 scenes from Jesus' life in a sequential illustrated narrative.

=== 1504 ===
- Hans Burgkmair's painting Saint Croce depicts Jesus' life in panels and uses speech balloons.
- Hans Holbein the Elder paints an altarpiece about St. Paul, the Basilica San Paolo Fuori Le Mura, which is a sequential illustrated narrative about St. Paul.

=== 1521 ===
- Lucas Cranach the Elder illustrates the Passional Christi und Antichristi, a book by Martin Luther, Philipp Melanchton and Johann Schwertfeger. It compares and contrasts the life of Jesus with that of the Pope, making it a prototypical graphic novel.

=== 1523 ===
- Hans Holbein the Younger starts working on his Totentanz (Dance of Death) series. These sequential illustrations, based on the Danse Macabre concept, are notable for being a prototypical graphic novel.

=== 1526 ===
- Erhard Schön makes the engraving Bauernhochzeit (Peasant Wedding), which uses several panels.

=== 1527 ===
- Hans Burgkmair's woodcut Wechselndes Glück (Changing Luck) is a picture story about luck/bad luck in life.

=== 1529 ===
- Lucas Cranach the Elder's painting Law and Grace depicts the life of Adam in a sequential narrative.

=== 1530 ===
- Erhard Schön makes the engraving Szenen aus dem Leben des Hl. Dominicus (Scenes From The Life of St. Dominique), which visualizes the life of Saint Dominic as a picture story. His Narrenkäfig (Fools' Cage) makes use of speech balloons.

=== 1535 ===
- Erhard Schön makes the engraving Die Sechs furthereflichen geistlichen gaben (The Six Excellent Spiritual Gifts), which uses several panels. His drawing Teufels Dudelsack (The Devil's Bagpipe) is an early example of a political cartoon.

=== 1560 ===
- Pieter Bruegel the Elder paints Seven Wise and Seven Foolish Virgins, a biblical painting which shows a sequential narrative with clearly separated images. He also paints Twelve Proverbs, which frames twelve proverbs with a text underneath each image, making it an early example of a text comic.

=== 1565 ===
- Pieter Bruegel the Elder paints The Four Seasons, a series consisting of the works The Gloomy Day, The Harvesters, The Hay Harvest and The Return of the Herd, which are a conceptual series of paintings following an established pattern, albeit not in a particular reading order.

=== 1567 ===
- A cenotaph devoted to emperor Maximilian I of Austria with a picture story, designed by Bernhard, Arnold, and Florian Abel, is finally completed. By this point both Maximilian I and the Abel brothers have all died. The project is finished by Alexander Colyn.

=== 1572 ===
- Hans Rogel the Elder prints the engraving Die Erscheinung weisser Kreuze über drei Kirchen in Konstantinopel (The Appearance of White Crosses above the Churches of Constantinople), which describes a real-life strange sky phenomenon, observed above Constantinople. The event is visualized in a two-panel picture story.

=== 1576 ===
- Frans Hogenberg makes an engraving depicting the Spanish Fury in Antwerp, which is notable for its use of illustrated sequences, with text underneath the images.

=== 1577 ===
- Hans Rogel the Elder makes the engraving Riesenwalfish bei Antwerpen, about a real-life beached whale found in Antwerp. The event is visualized in a two-panel picture story.

=== 1586 ===
- Hans Schultes the Elder prints the engraving Zwei sonderbare menschenfressende Tiere (Two Wondrous Man-Eating Animals), which shows two monsters in two separate panels.

=== 1589 ===
- Frans Hogenberg makes an engraving depicting the assassination of Henry III of France, notable for its use of illustrated sequences, with text underneath the images.
- Caspar Krebs makes an engraving, Mord in Neuburg an der Donau, depicting a real-life account of a murder in the German town Neuberg an der Donau. The work is an early example of a sequential illustrated narrative.
- Hans Schultes the Elder prints the engraving Die Hinrichtung von Hans Alewekher, Mörder aus Augsburg (The Execution of Hans Alewekher, Murderer From Augsburg''), a picture story about a real-life murder.

=== 1591 ===
- Georg Kress brings out an engraving, Nachricht von 300 Hexen und ihrem Pakt mit dem Teufel, about a witchcraft trial. The work is notable for its use of sequential illustrated narratives.

=== 1593 ===
- Bartholomäus Käppeler prints an engraving based on a real-life murder, Der Mörder von Lungenetz. The engraving is told in separate panels.

=== 1595 ===
- Caspar Krebs makes an engraving, Mord in Ildorf, depicting a real-life account of a murder in the German town Ildorf. The work is an early example of a sequential illustrated narrative.

=== 1599 ===
- Antonio Tempesta makes The Life of St. Laurentius, a sequential illustrated narrative, with text underneath the images.

== 17th century ==
=== 1602 ===
- Hans Rogel the Younger makes the engraving Mord in Itzenhausen, a picture story about a real-life family murder.

=== 1605 ===
- Jeremias Gath prints the engraving Nachricht von einem Mord und Zerstückelung in Halle, Sachsen (News about a Murder and Mutilation in Halle, Sachsen), a picture story about a real-life robbery and murder.

=== 1606 ===
- Georg Kress brings out an engraving, Missetat einiger Totengräber, about a murder committed by a gravedigger in Silesia. The work is notable for its use of sequential illustrated narratives.

=== 1609 ===
- An unknown artist from Prague, named Der Prager Meister von 1609 by historians, makes a woodcut engraving about a real-life murder, told as a multi-panel picture story.

=== 1613 ===
- Otto van Veen makes De Bataafse Opstand, a series of sequential paintings about the Revolt of the Batavi.

=== 1615 ===
- Hans Schultes the Elder makes an engraving, Zwo Newe und Erschröckliche Zeittungen von Vier Vbelthäteren (Two New and Frightening Reports about Four Law Breakers), a picture story about the trial and execution of a thief and three robbers.

=== 1616 ===
- Lukas Schultes makes a picture story about a real-life family murder.

=== 1633 ===
- Jacques Callot etches Les Grandes Misères de la guerre, a picture story depicting gruesome scenes and war atrocities during the Thirty Years' War.

=== 1653 ===
- Johann Schubert makes an engraving, Schrecklike Mordtat des Georg Strange am Gründonnerstag (Horrible Murder by George Strange on Maundy Thursday), which is a multi-panel picture story.

=== 1654 ===
- Elias Wellhöfer makes the engraving Geschichte einer vom Teufel besessenen Frau ("Story of a Woman Possessed by the Devil"), a picture story about a real-life woman accused of and executed for witchcraft.

=== 1663 ===
- A sequence, depicting a complete narrative - from the first meeting of the "actors" to the final murder - can be seen in the thirty-chapter headings in John Reynolds' The Triumph of God's Revenge Against the Crying and Execrable Sinne of .... Murther. The resemblance to a comic strip in form (but not matter) is striking.

=== 1666 ===
- Elias Wellhöfer makes the engraving Verurteilung und Hinrichtung eines Zauberers ("Sentence and Execution of a Wizard"), a picture story about a rare case of a man accused of and executed for witchcraft. The same year he makes another picture story, Der Prozess gegen Anna Schwaynhofer aus Augsburg wegen Gotteslästerung (The Blasphemy Trial Against Anna Schwaynhofer), about a real-life case where a woman was executed because of blasphemy.

=== 1667 ===
- Romeyn de Hooghe becomes a political cartoonist. Several of his cartoons are notable for being picture stories.

=== 1669 ===
- Elias Wellhöfer makes the engraving Hexenprozess in Augsburg ("Witch Trial in Augsburg"), a picture story about a real-life women executed on account of witchcraft.

=== 1672–1673 ===
- Francis Barlow draws The Cheese of Dutch Rebellion, a political cartoon which features a text beneath the image, as well as speech balloons.

=== 1677 ===
- Jan van den Aveelen makes sequential illustrations with text underneath the images, reporting about the marriage between Prince William of Orange and Princess Mary of England.

=== 1681 ===
- Jan van den Aveelen makes sequential illustrations with text underneath the images, visualizing a Muslim prayer in four panels.

=== 1682 ===
- Matthew Turner publishes A True Narrative of the Horrid Hellish Popish Plot, in which artist Francis Barlow uses panels and balloons for a historical account about the life of Titus Oates.

=== 1688 ===
- Jan van den Aveelen makes sequential illustrations with text underneath the images, reporting about the coronation of William III of England.

=== 1698 ===
- Jan van den Aveelen makes sequential illustrations with text underneath the images, reporting about Catholic violence against Protestants.

== 18th century ==
=== 1717 ===
- Gijsbert De Groot publishes Afbeelding van de Geboorte, Lijden en Sterven van de Salighmaecker der Weereld

=== 1724 ===
- William Hogarth draws A Just View of the British Stage, a cartoon notable for its use of speech balloons.

=== 1731 ===
- William Hogarth paints A Harlot's Progress, a series of paintings which follow a sequential order.

=== 1735 ===
- William Hogarth paints A Rake's Progress, a series of paintings which follow a sequential order.

=== 1736 ===
- William Hogarth paints Four Times of the Day, a series of paintings which follow a sequential order.

=== 1747 ===
- William Hogarth paints Industry and Idleness, a series of paintings which follow a sequential order.

=== 1751 ===
- William Hogarth paints The Four Stages of Cruelty and Beer Street and Gin Lane, a series of paintings which follow a sequential order.

=== 1755 ===
- William Hogarth paints Humours of an Election, a series of paintings which follow a sequential order.

=== 1757 ===
- Mary and Matthew Darly create Now and Then, a cartoon with speech balloons and a before and after sequence.

=== 1766 ===
- Benjamin Franklin creates the political cartoon The Colonies Reduced, which makes use of a sequence and speech balloons.

=== 1773 ===
- Mary and Matthew Darly create Macaronies Drawn After The Life, a cartoon with a two-part sequence.

=== 1781 ===
- In The Netherlands, Jan Oortman and, from the 1790s on, assisted by his son Gerrit, make catchpenny prints with picture stories.

=== 1783 ===
- Joseph Franz von Göz publishes Leonardo und Blandine an adaptation of his play in pictures.
- Thomas Rowlandson publishes Two New Sliders for the State Magic Lantern

=== 1784 ===
- Thomas Rowlandson publishes The Loves of the Fox and the Badger, or The Coalition Wedding

=== 1790s ===
- In Sweden Carl August Ehrensvärd and Johan Tobias Sergel create sequential picture stories, depicting parties, drinking and sexuality. They are made for private use and only published later.

=== 1792 ===
- James Gillray draws the two-sequential cartoon French Liberty, British Slavery.

=== 1793 ===
- Richard Newton draws Progress Of A Player, which is an early narrative text comic.
- James Gillray draws the text comic John Bull's Progress.

=== 1794 ===
- Richard Newton draws Sketches In A Shaving Shop, an early text comic built around conceptual vignettes rather than a story. He also draws Progress Of A Woman Of Pleasure and Giving Up The Ghost, Or One Too Many, both text comics which follow a narrative.

=== 1795 ===
- Richard Newton draws Samples Of Sweethearts and Wives, Contrasted Husbands and Clerical Alphabet, early text comics built around conceptual vignettes rather than a story.

=== 1796 ===
- David Hess writes and illustrates Hollandia Regenerata, a satirical pamphlet which consists of a thematically connected series of cartoony illustrations, with text under the images.

=== 1797 ===
- James Gillray draws the two-panel cartoon The Tables Turn'd.

== 19th century ==
=== 1800 ===
- James Gillray publishes Democracy, or – a Sketch of the Life of Buonaparte, a satirical text comic about Napoleon Bonaparte which uses panels.

=== 1801 ===
- Pehr Nordquist creates a sequential picture-story, Päder Målare och Munthen.

=== 1807 ===
- Dutch poet Willem Bilderdijk makes an eight-page picture story/text comic, Hanepoot, for his nine-year-old son, although he does not publish it.

=== 1808 ===
- William Charles releases the picture story Tom, the Piper's Son.

=== 1810 ===
- François Aimé Louis Dumoulin publishes Voyages et aventures surprenantes de Robinson Crusoé, an adaptation in pictures of the novel.

=== 1812 ===
- Thomas Rowlandson's illustrations to William Combe's novel about Dr. Syntax are notable for following one central character throughout a series of humorous sequences. The character will be re-used in two sequel books, printed in 1820 and 1821, making him the first serialized cartoon character. He is also the first cartoon character to be published in episode format in a magazine and inspire merchandising.
- Hokusai publishes Hokusai Manga (Sketches by Hokusai), a series of illustrations that will have great influence on manga as a genre.

=== 1816 ===
- George Cruikshank publishes Gent, No Gent and Regent, a political cartoon poking fun at Prince George in three successive sequences.

=== 1818 ===
- Robert Branston makes a humoristic text comic: The Comical Cat.

=== 1819 ===
- Isaac Robert Cruikshank publishes the sequential illustration Every Man on His Perch, of Going to Hobby Fair.

=== 1822 ===
- James Catnach pays an unnamed engraver to copy the illustrations of the Cruikshanks for Pierce Egan's Life in London and publishes them on a broadsheet. He will publish two sequels.

=== 1825 ===
- June 11: First publication of The Glasgow Looking Glass (1825-1826), a British magazine that goes down in history as the first publication devoted entirely to comics and cartoons. In the same magazine William Heath publishes the pantomime comic History of a Coat, which is notable for having the first appearance of the cliffhanger To be continued.... Others comic from the same period by Heath are The Life of a Soldier; a Narrative and Descriptive Poem, An Essay on Modern Medical Education and A Happy New Year.

=== 1826 ===
- Isaac Robert Cruikshank publishes the sequential cartoon The National Pop-Shop in Threadneedle Street.

=== 1828 ===
- June 22: William Innell Clement publishes Hogarth's Harlot's Progress and Monkeyana, or the Gambler's Progress in columns with other drawings on a single page of his newspaper Bell's Life in London #330.
- August: Jean Ignace Isidore Gérard Grandville publishes Métamorphoses du Jour, an illustrated book which anthropomorphizes humans as animals.

=== 1830 ===
- November 4: First publication of the satirical journal La Caricature (1830-1843) by Charles Philipon, which will attract many French caricaturist and early prototypical comic artists. It will also inspire similar satirical magazines in other countries.

=== 1831 ===
- Charles Philipon, chief editor of the magazine La Caricature publishes a sequential cartoon, Les Poires by Honoré Daumier, which depicts French king Louis-Philippe I gradually transforming into a pear. The cartoon causes much upheaval from the royal court.
- June 24: George Goodger publishes for his partner William Innell Clement Gallery of 140 Comicalities, a magazine of four pages of drawings, including narrative sequences in columns.

=== 1832 ===
- December 1: The first issue of the French satirical magazine Le Charivari is published. It will offer pages for countless cartoonists, caricaturists, illustrators and comics artists over its century-run and only be disestablished in August 1937.

=== 1833 ===
- First publication of Histoire de Mr. Jabot by Swiss teacher and amateur artist Rodolphe Töpffer, eventually initiating a trend of "histoires en images" (picture-stories).

=== 1834 ===
- July 15: Charles Jameson Grant publishes Adventures of the Buggins's in three strips with speech balloons in Every Body's Album and Caricature Magazine #14.

=== 1836 ===
- George Cruikshank publishes Comic Alphabet, an illustration of the alphabet in a sequential narrative.
- Pieter van Loon publishes Spotprent Op De Plannen Tot De Oprichting Van Een Girobank, a satire in comic strip format on the girobank banking system.

=== 1837 ===
- Rodolphe Töpffer publishes Histoire de Mr. Vieux Bois
- Rodolphe Töpffer publishes Monsieur Crépin.

=== 1839 ===
- George Cruikshank's illustrations to William Ainsworth's novel Jack Sheppard make use of several successive illustrations to tell the story.
- Amédée de Noé, a.k.a. Cham, publishes the comics Mr. Lajaunisse and Mr. Lamélasse.

=== 1840 ===
- Rodolphe Töpffer publishes Monsieur Pencil.
- Rodolphe Töpffer publishes Le Docteur Festus
- Fritz von Dardel, publishes his earliest known comic strip.
- Amédée de Noé, a.k.a. Cham, publishes Deux Vieilles Filles Vaccinées à Marier.
- Edward Williams Clay creates This Is The House That Jack Built.

=== 1841 ===
- July 17: The British satirical magazine Punch is launched by Henry Mayhew and Ebenezer Landells. It will be a haven for many British caricaturists and prototypical comics.
- Rodolphe Töpffer's The Adventures of Mr. Oldbuck is published in the U.K.
- Amédée de Noé, a.k.a. Cham, publishes Un Génie Incompris (M. Barnabé Gogo).

=== 1842 ===
- Rodolphe Töpffer's The Adventures of Obadiah Oldbuck is published in the U.S.A.

=== 1843 ===
- Frenchman Richard De Querelles publishes Le Déluge à Bruxelles, the first comic book published in Belgium.
- Cancellation of the French satirical cartoons and comics magazine La Caricature

=== 1844 ===
- George Cruikshank publishes the picture novel The Bachelors Own Book Being Twenty Four Passages in The Life of Mr. Lambkin, the first English origin comic book.
- Fritz von Dardel, publishes Ett Frieri, the first Swedish comic strip.
- Amédée de Noé, a.k.a. Cham, publishes the comics Impressions de Voyage de Monsieur Boniface.

=== 1845 ===
- First publication of the German satirical magazine Fliegende Blätter, which will attract many German caricaturists and early comics artists.
- Heinrich Hoffmann publishes Der Struwwelpeter, a moralistic picture story aimed at children.
- Rodolphe Töpffer publishes Histoire d'Albert.
- Rodolphe Töpffer publishes Histoire de Monsieur Cryptogame.
- The Dutch illustrator Hilmar Johannes Backer publishes De Geschiedenis van Mijnheer Kardoes en Mejuffrouw Muizenschrik.

=== 1847 ===
- Gustave Doré publishes Les Travaux d'Hercule.
- Henry George Hine draws Mr. Crindle's Rapid Career Upon Town, based on a script by Albert Smith.
- Julius Kell writes a new German text for Rodolphe Töpffer's Histoire de Monsieur Cryptogame, which he translates into Fahrten Abenteuer Des Herrn Steckelbein.

=== 1848 ===
- February 5: Charles Philipon publishes the first issue of the French satirical comics and cartoons magazine Le Journal pour rire. It will run until 1855.
- Félix Nadar draws the comics Les Aventures Illustrées du Prince pour rire' (1848), Vie politique et littéraire de Viperin, journaliste et industriel (1848) and Vie publique et privée de mossieu Réac (1848–49).
- Carl Reinhardt's comic strip Meister Lapp und sein Lehrjunge Pips appears in Fliegende Blätter.

=== 1849 ===
- January 6: Dutch illustrator Christiaan Le Blansch creates the pantomime comic Politiek Gesprek Vóór de Verkiezingen, which is blatantly copied from an earlier cartoon which appeared in the German magazine Fliegende Blätter in the first half of 1848.
- George Cruikshank publishes The Preparatory School for Fast Men, a gag comic which makes use of speech balloons to tell a sequential story. The same year he and Horace Mayhew create the lengthy humor comic The Tooth-Ache.
- Gustave Doré draws the humoristic text comic Histoire d'une Invitation à la Campagne.
- John Leech creates Mr. Briggs, who will become a recurring character in his cartoons.
- Félix Nadar creates Ma Maison de Campagne et Mon Archtecte, which appears in L'Illustration.
- James A. and Donald F. Read publish Journey To The Gold Diggins By Jeremiah Saddlebags, which is the first picture story (or comic book) published in the United States.
- XOX publishes Outline History of an Expedition to California: Containing the Fate of the Get All You Can Mining Association, another early picture story published in the U.S.

=== 1850 ===
- January 12 - February 8: Louis Morel-Retz, a.k.a. Stop, draws Les Aventures de Monsieur Verdreau.
- August 3: Francisco Augusto Noguiera da Silva draws the text comic Aventuras sentimentais e dramáticas do senhor Simplício Baptista, which appears in the Portuguese magazine Revista Popular. It is signed with the name Flora and is probably work by Francisco Augusto Nogueira da Silva. This comic strip is, in fact, plagiarism of Stop's Les Aventures de Monsieur Verdreau.
- Gustave Doré draws the humoristic text comic Désagréments des animaux d'agrément.

=== 1851 ===
- Gustave Doré publishes Trois Artistes Incompris et Mécontents, Voyage en Allemagne and L'Homme Aux Cent Mille Écus.
- Alexander VerHuell draws the comic Zijn er zoo? and Zoo zijn er.

=== 1852 ===
- Gustave Doré draws the humoristic text comics Une Ascension au Mont Blanc, Les Eaux de Baden, Les Vacances du Collégien and Une Heureuse Vocation.
- Nadar creates M. Classique, En Ballon (a.k.a. Les Aventures de M. Barnichon L' Aéronaute) and En Omnibus for the magazine L'Eclair.
- Edward Williams Clay creates The Seven Stages Of The Office Seeker.

=== 1853 ===
- August–December: John McLenan creates the text comic How Mr. T Square Prepared His Picture for the Academy in The New York Journal.
- Richard Doyle publishes Brown, Jones and Robinson in Punch.
- Félicien Rops publishes the comic strip Les époux Van-Blague, making him one of the earliest Belgian comics artists.
- John Tenniel publishes the comic strip Peter Piper.

=== 1854 ===
- Félicien Rops publishes Le Juif errant et ferré.
- Gustave Doré publishes Histoire Pittoresque de la Sainte Russie.
- Fritz von Dardel, publishes Familjen Tutings Lustresa till Bomarsund.

=== 1855 ===
- September: John McLenan creates several text comics about Mr. Slim, in Harper's New Monthly Magazine.
- Cancellation of the French satirical illustrated magazine Le Journal pour rire.
- John Tenniel publishes the comic strip Mr. Spoonbill.

=== 1856 ===
- January 5: The first issue of the French satirical cartoons and comics magazine Journal amusant is published by Charles Philipon. It will run until December 1933.
- February 3: The first issue of the Belgian satirical magazine Uylenspiegel is published, where several Belgian caricaturists and prototypical comics artists will find room to publish their drawings. It will appear until 1863.
- Félicien Rops publishes Promenade au jardin zoologique.
- The first issue of the Dutch humor magazine Humoristisch Album is published. It will provide room for future comics artists and cartoonists like Jan Linse and J. Holswilder.
- Francisco Augusto Noguiera da Silva draws the text comic Index da Physiologia, which appears in the Portuguese magazine Asmodeu.
- Timoléon Lobrichon publishes Histoire de Mr. Tuberculus and Histoire de Mr. Grenouillet.

=== 1857 ===
- Der Staatshämorrhoidarius by Count Franz Pocci - the first comic book from Germany (republished from the magazine Fliegende Blätter, from 1845).
- Francisco Augusto Noguiera da Silva draws the text comic As quatro Luas do Matrimónio, which appears in the Portuguese magazine Jornal para Rír.
- Bertall publishes Défauts des Enfants for La Semaine des Enfants, until 1862.

=== 1858 ===
- Turmiolan Tommin elämäkerta (The Life Story of Pernicious Tommy), a Finnish temperance society publication - the first comic book drawn by a female artist, (Alexandra Frosterus-Såltin)
- Julius Kell's German translation of Rodolphe Töpffer's Histoire de Monsieur Cryptogame provides the basis for J.J.A. Goeverneur's Dutch translation Reizen en Avonturen van Mijnheer Prikkebeen.

=== 1859 ===
- Wilhelm Busch starts publishing various self-written and drawn picture stories for Fliegende Blätter.
- Fritz von Dardel, publishes Herrar Black & Smith på väg till Skandinavien.
- 'Franciszek Kostrzewski draws Jedynaczek's Story in 32 Pictures.

=== 1860 ===
- December: Henrique Fleiuss establishes the Brazilian humor and comics magazine Semana Ilustrada, with the recurring characters Dr. Semana, Negrinha and Moleque. It will run until 1875.

=== 1861 ===
- March 9: John McLenan creates the comic strip The Flight of Abraham in Harper's Weekly, a satirical comic starring Abraham Lincoln and notable for the use of speech balloons.
- Wilhelm Busch's picture story Metaphern der Liebe (Metaphor of Love) in Fliegende Blätter features the first instance of lightning bolt symbols in a character's eyes, to imply anger.
- Félicien Rops publishes M. Coremans Au Tir National, the earliest Belgian comic strip.

=== 1862 ===
- Friedrich Lossow draws the text comic Der Vergebliche Rattenjagd in Münchener Bilderbogen.
- Wilhelm Busch publishes Diogenes und die bösen Buben von Korinth (Diogenes and the Mean Kids from Korinthe) in Fliegende Blätter, which features the first known instance of characters being comically flattened.

=== 1863 ===
- The Belgian satirical magazine Uylenspiegel is disestablished.

=== 1864 ===
- Wilhelm Busch's picture story Die Rutschpartie (The Downhill Slide) is the first known example of a gag comic where a sled going downhill causes many people to get kicked on top of each other on the sled.
- Wilhelm Busch publishes Bilderpossen, his first comic book.

=== 1865 ===
- Wilhelm Busch draws Ein Neujahrskonzert (New Years' Concert), better known as Der Virtuos (The Virtuoso), a gag comic about a pianist, notable for its use of comedic exaggeration and movement lines.
- October: Wilhelm Busch publishes the picture story Max und Moritz, which becomes a huge success, with many translations. It will also inspire many gag comics.
- The first issue of the French satirical cartoons and comics magazine La Lune is published. It will run until 1867.

=== 1866 ===
- July 22: Tomás Padrò publishes Las Delicias de la Torre.
- Charles Keene publishes the text comic The Adventures of Miss Lavinia Brounjones, which is the first comic to star a female character.
- André Gill publishes the text comic L'Amateur de Violon: Étude Musicale.

=== 1867 ===
- October: The first episode of Wilhelm Busch's Hans Huckebein is serialized in the newspaper Über Land und Meer.
- November 17: André Gill publishes an offensive cartoon of Napoleon III in an issue of La Lune. The emperor has its chief editor, François Polo, fined and sentenced to two months of jail. La Lune is forced to close down afterwards.
- Wilhelm Busch's Die feindlichen Nachbarn oder die Folgen der Musik (The Villainous Neighbors, or Musical Consequences) is the first comic strip to comically contrast characters' actions in two rooms bordering one another.
- Charles H. Ross (text) and Émilie de Tessier publish the comic strip Ally Sloper.
- Léonce Petit publishes Les Mésaventures de M. Bêton (1867-1868).
- János Jankó creates a text comic named Hungarian Miska and German Miska. An old fairy tale about a common mule, which is one of the earliest Hungarian comics.

=== 1868 ===
- January 26: The first issue of La Lune's successor, L'Éclipse, is published. Within the same year this French satirical cartoons and comics magazine will suffer similar controversy.
- August 9: A cartoon by André Gill, Monsieur X...? mocks magistrates and leads to a court case which results in the publication being fined.

=== 1869 ===
- Angelo Agostini publishes As Aventuras de Nhô Quim, the first Brazilian comic strip in history.

=== 1870s (unspecified which year) ===
- Kobayashi Eitaku creates a scroll showing the decomposition of a female corpse in nine successive drawings.

=== 1870 ===
- Karel Klíč draws Die Friedensverhandlungen, a text comic ridiculing politicians Jules Favre and Otto von Bismarck.
- Wilhelm Busch publishes his picture story Sint Antonius of Padua, which is sued on 8 July by the public ministry of Offenburg for indecency and blasphemy. On 27 March 1871 the judge rules in Busch's favor.

=== 1871 ===
- March: First publication of the American satirical magazine Puck by Joseph Ferdinand Keppler. It will offer room for various cartoonists and comics artists.
- Léonce Petit publishes Histoires Campagnardes.

=== 1872 ===
- Wilhelm Busch publishes the picture stories Die fromme Helene (Devout Helena), Schnurrdiburr, oder die Bienen (Schnurrdiburr, of the Bees) and Bilder zur Jobsiade (Pictures of the Jobsiad).

=== 1873 ===
- Josep Lluís Pellicer's picture stories Una Pasión Desconocida, Por Un Coracero and Escenars Matritenses appear in the Spanish satirical magazine El Mundo Cómico.
- Francisco Cubas publishes the picture story A Buen Pagadar... in the Spanish satirical magazine El Mundo Cómico.

=== 1875 ===
- May 22: Rafael Bordalo Pinheiro creates Zé Povinho, the first Portuguese comics character.
- September 11: Livingston Hopkins publishes Professor Tigwissel's Burglar Alarm in The Daily Graphic, which is one of the earliest newspaper comic strips.
- November 28: The final issue of the Brazilian humor and comics magazine Semana Ilustrada is published.
- Wilhelm Busch publishes his Tobias Knopp picture stories trilogy.
- Charles Keene publishes the comic Our American Cousin in Europe, which makes use of both speech balloons and sequences.
- James Francis Sullivan's long-running comic strip The British Working Man makes its debut. It will run until 1901.

=== 1876 ===
- June: Cancellation of the French satirical cartoons and comics magazine L'Éclipse.

=== 1877 ===
- 6 October: Henri Berthelot launches the Canadian satirical weekly Le Canard, which will offer room to several Canadian cartoonists.

=== 1879 ===
- Palmer Cox publishes The Brownies, the first Canadian comic strip.
- Wilhelm Busch releases the picture story Fipps, Der Affe (Fipps, The Monkey).

=== 1880 ===
- January 3: The French satirical comics and cartoons magazine La Caricature is first published. It will run until 31 December 1904.

=== 1881 ===
- July: Arthur Burdett Frost's Our Cat Eats Rat Poison (later titled Fatal Mistake) is published.
- October 29: First publication of the American illustrated satirical magazine Judge.

=== 1882 ===
- December: First publication of the American newspaper Grit, a pipeline for popular comic strips.
- Wilhelm Busch publishes the picture story Plisch und Plum.

=== 1883 ===
- Angelo Agostini publishes As Aventuras de Zé Caipora.
- Albert Robida publishes the graphic novel Le Vingtième Siècle, which fantasizes how the 20th century will be and what it will look like.

=== 1884 ===
- May 3: The first issue of the British comics magazine Ally Sloper's Half Holiday is published. It will run until 9 September 1916. Between 1922 and 1923, 1948 and 1949 and 1976 and 1977 it will be briefly revived.

=== 1885 ===
- Political cartoonist Harold R. Heaton joins the Chicago Daily Tribune.

=== 1886 ===
- Illustrator Mecachis publishes the first issue of his illustrated humoristic magazine La Caricatura.
- Eduardo Sojo creates Don Quijote, a comic strip in silhouettes.

=== 1887 ===
- January: The first issue of the Norwegian illustrated children's magazine Norsk Barneblad is published.
- Albert Robida publishes the graphic novel La Guerre au Vingtième Siècle, which fantasizes what war in the 20th century will be and what it will look like.
- Jan Pieter Holswilder creates a pantomime comic named No. 13, Het Ongeluksnummer, which is published in the Dutch humor magazine Humoristisch Album.
- In Japan, the first translation of a Western children's book (and comic book) is released, Wilhelm Busch's 1866 picture story Max und Moritz.

=== 1889 ===
- January 12: Georges Colomb publishes the comics series La Famille Fenouillard (1889-1893) under the pen name Christophe.
- August: Victor T'Sas, A.K.A. Vias starts making illustrations and picture stories for the Belgian magazine Le Globe Illustré.

=== 1890 ===
- May 17: The first issue of the British comics magazine Comic Cuts is published. It will run until September 1953, after which it merges with Knockout.
- July 26: The first issue of Alfred Harmsworth's British comics magazine Illustrated Chips is published. It will run until 1953.
- Georges Colomb publishes the comics series Le Sapeur Camember (1890-1896) under the pen name Christophe.
- The Dutch Catholic teacher Johannes Franciscus Nuijens (Korporaal Achilles) publishes the satirical text comic Het Rapport der Defensiecommissie toegelicht en eenigszins uitgebreid door Korporaal Achilles (The Rapport of the Commission of Defense, explained and somewhat expanded by Korporaal Achilles).
- Albert Robida publishes the graphic novel Le Vingtième Siècle. La Vie Électrique, which fantasizes how 20th century life will be and look like.
- The first issue of the Dutch illustrated children's magazine Geïllustreerd Stuiversblad is published.

=== 1891 ===
- The Dutch Catholic teacher Johannes Franciscus Nuijens (Korporaal Achilles) publishes the political science fiction comic De Toekomststaat (Een Nachtmerrie Fin de Siècle). Visioenen en Droombeelden uit de 20ste eeuw (The Future State (A Nightmare at the End of the Century). Visions and Dreamscapes from the 20th Century)

=== 1892 ===
- March 16: The first issue of the Swedish illustrated children's magazine Kamratposten is published.
- April 4: Ramón Escaler creates an early comic strip with speech balloons for La Semana Cómica.
- June 1: Jimmy Swinnerton publishes The Little Bears (1892-1896), the first American comic strip, notable for having recurring characters.
- June 23: The Chicago Inter Ocean launches its own full colour comics supplement.
- July 30: The first issue of the British comics magazine Funny Wonder is published. It will run until 25 May 1901.

=== 1893 ===
- May 21: Joseph Pulitzer's newspaper New York World publishes the first comics page in colour, namely Walt McDougall's The Possibilities of the Broadway Cable Car. On the same day they also launch a comics supplement on Sundays, thus launching the Sunday funnies phenomenon.
- December 9: Georges Colomb publishes the comics series L' Idée Fixe du Savant Cosinus (1893-1899) under the pen name Christophe.
- December 23: Georges Colomb creates Les Malices de Plick et Plock (1893-1904) under the pen name Christophe.
- John Tenniel becomes the first cartoonist to be knighted.
- The Dutch Catholic teacher Johannes Franciscus Nuijens (Korporaal Achilles) publishes the political science fiction comic Klacht van een Onderwijzer over De Vrije & Orde Oefeningen op de Lagere School (Complaint from a Teacher about the Free & Disciplinary Exercises in Primary School).

=== 1894 ===
- April 29: Charles W. Saalburg creates The Ting-Lings, considered one of the earliest American comic strips.
- June 2: In one of the cartoons Richard F. Outcault draws for Truth the character who will later become The Yellow Kid can be spotted, though he is still nothing more but a background character and since the series is published in black-and-white nobody calls him by his name yet.
- June 16: Jack Butler Yeats's Chubb-Lock Holmes makes its debut.
- November 10: The first issue of the French satirical cartoons and comics magazine Le Rire is published.

=== 1895 ===
- May 5: Richard F. Outcault's cartoon series is published in the Pulitzer newspaper The New York World, where it receives the title Down in Hogan's Alley.

=== 1896 ===
- January 5: A colour episode of Richard F. Outcault's Hogan's Alley marks the first time the central character is depicted wearing a yellow gown, which gives him and the series the name The Yellow Kid.
- October 18: Newspaper owner William Randolph Hearst buys Richard F. Outcault away from Joseph Pulitzer's The New York World so that The Yellow Kid can instead appear in the new colour supplement The American Humorist of his newspaper The New York Journal. The series Hogan's Alley continues in The World but drawn by George Luks, while Outcault's version of Hogan's Alley in The American Humorist uses the different title McFadden's Row of Flats. This is the first widely publicized legal battle between two newspapers over a comic strip and a turning point in the history of the modern comics industry.
- October 25: The episode The Yellow Kid And His Phonograph of Richard F. Outcault's The Yellow Kid mark the first time speech balloons and a sequential narrative are used in the series. This is widely regarded as the starting point of the modern (American) comic strip.
- The first issue of the Dutch illustrated children's magazine Weekblad Voor De Jeugd is published. It will run until 1915.

=== 1897 ===
- January: The first issue of the French satirical cartoons and comics magazine Le Cri de Paris is published, which will run until the outbreak of World War II, in 1940.
- January 24: Victor T'Sas, A.K.A. Vias, prints a picture story in the Belgian magazine Le Patriote Illustré about the recent real-life visit of Muslim delegate Philippe Grenier to French Parliament.
- March 11: Albert Engström establishes the Swedish humor magazine Strix, which will become a hotspot for several cartoonists.
- May 30: Albert Engström's character Kolingen makes his debut in the magazine Strix, making him the oldest recurring Swedish comics character.
- November 21: J.B. Lowitz's The Captain Kiddis Kids debuts.
- December 12: The first episode of The Katzenjammer Kids by Rudolph Dirks appears in the Hearst newspaper New York Journal. It will become the longest-running comic strip of all time, only ending in 2006.
- December 18: In the second episode of Rudolph Dirks' The Katzenjammer Kids the boys' mother, Die Mamma, makes her debut.
- Homer Davenport publishes the text comic A Venetian Episode - How The Doves Did Davenport.

=== 1898 ===
- In Jimmy Swinnerton's The Little Tigers the character Mr. Jack makes his debut. He will have a spin-off comic later.
- January 23: The final episode of Richard F. Outcault's The Yellow Kid is published.
- February 26: Dan Leno's Comics Journal, a comics magazine created by British comedian Dan Leno, is the first celebrity comic. Leno writes his stories personally, while Tom Browne provides the illustrations.
- October 29: Arthur White creates Jungle Jinks for children's magazine The Playbox. It's the first funny animal comic strip in the United Kingdom and will run until 1947, albeit drawn by other artists, among them Mabel Francis Taylor.
- Benjamin Rabier draws a comic strip named Tintin-Lutin, which allegedly later inspires Hergé to create Tintin.

=== 1899 ===
- November 5: Ed Payne's long-running newspaper comic Billy the Boy Artist debuts. It will run until 1955.

== Deaths ==
=== 16th century ===
- August 9, 1516: Hieronymus Bosch, Dutch painter and prototypical comics artist (The Seven Deadly Sins and the Four Last Things, Death and the Miser, The Garden of Earthly Delights, The Haywain Triptych, The Last Judgment, Triptych of the Temptation of St. Anthony, Hell and the Flood), dies at age 65 or 66.
- 1524: Hans Holbein the Elder, German painter and prototypical comics artist (various religious works with sequential illustrated narratives), dies at age 63–64.
- September 9, 1525: Pieter Bruegel the Elder, Flemish painter and prototypical comics artist (Twelve Proverbs, Seven Wise and Seven Foolish Virgins), dies at age 39 or 44.
- 1531: Hans Burgkmair, German painter and woodcut artist (St. Croce, Wechselndes Glück), dies at age 57 or 58.
- 1542:
  - September 20, 1542: Erhard Schön, German painter and woodcut artist (Bauernhochzeit, Szenen aus dem Leben des Hl. Dominicus, Die Sechs furthereflichen geistlichen gaben, Narrenkäfig), dies at age 50 or 51.
- 1543: Hans Holbein the Younger, German painter and printer (Totentanz, A.K.A. Dance of Death), dies at age 45 or 46.
- 1553
  - October 16, 1553: Lucas Cranach the Elder, German painter and prototypical comics artist (various religious works with sequential illustrated narratives), dies at age 80–81.
- 1565:
  - May 14, 1565: Florian Abel, German graphic artist, sculptor and painter (made a sequential picture on a cenotaph devoted to Maximilian I of Austria), dies at an unspecified age.
- 1590: Frans Hogenberg, Flemish-German painter, engraver and cartographer (The Spanish Fury, Murder of Henry III of France), dies at age 54 or 55.
- 1592: Hans Rogel the Elder, German engraver and printer (Die Erscheinung weisser Kreuze über drei Kirchen in Konstantinopel, Riesenwalfisch bei Antwerpen), dies at age 59 or 60.

=== 17th century ===
- August 6, 1612: Hans Rogel the Younger, German engraver (Mord in Itzenhausen), dies at age 52.
- May 6, 1629: Otto van Veen, Dutch-Flemish painter and prototypical comics artist (De Bataafse Opstand), dies at age 72 or 73.
- August 5, 1630: Antonio Tempesta, Italian engraver, painter and prototypical comics artist (Life of St. Laurentius), dies at age 74 or 75.
- 1634: Lucas Schultes, German engraver (made a 1616 picture story about a real-life family murder in Bentaroda), dies at age 40 or 41.
- March 24, 1635: Jacques Callot, French painter and etcher, (Les Grandes Misères de la guerre), dies at age 42 or 43 from stomach cancer at the age.
- 1667: Jan Christoffel Jegher, Flemish woodcut artist (his woodcuts were used to make catchpenny prints with picture stories), dies at age 48 or 49.

=== 18th century ===
- 1704: Francis Barlow, British illustrator and prototypical comics artist (The Cheese of Dutch Rebellion, A True Narrative of the Horrid Hellish Popish Plot) dies at age 67 or 68.
- June 15, 1708: Romeyn de Hooghe, Dutch caricaturist, engraver, painter and sculptor (made political propaganda picture stories), dies at age 62.
- May 18, 1727: Jan van den Aveelen, Dutch illustrator and engraver (made sequential illustrations about topical events), dies at age 76 or 77.
- October 26, 1764: William Hogarth, British painter, illustrator, cartoonist and prototypical comics artist (A Just View of the British Stage, A Harlot's Progress, A Rake's Progress, Marriage à-la-mode, The Four Stages of Cruelty, Industry and Idleness, Four Times of the Day, Beer Street and Gin Lane, Humours of an Election), dies at age 66.
- January 25, 1780: Matthew Darly, British printseller and caricaturist (Now and Then, Macaronies Drawn After The Life), dies at an unknown age.
- 1788: Hendrik Numan, Dutch woodcut artist (made catchpenny prints with picture stories), dies at age 51 or 52.
- April 17, 1790: Benjamin Franklin, American inventor, politician, publisher, diplomat, writer, printer and cartoonist (Join or Die, The Colonies Reduced), dies at age 84.
- December 8, 1798: Richard Newton, British cartoonist and caricaturist (Sketches In A Shaving Shop, Samples Of Sweethearts and Wives, Progress Of A Player, Progress Of A Woman Of Pleasure, Contrasted Husbands, Clerical Alphabet, Giving Up The Ghost, Or One Too Many and Undertakers In At The Death), dies of tyfus at the age of 21.

== 1800 ==
- May 21: Carl August Ehrensvärd, Swedish painter and caricaturist who made some early autobiographical pantomime comics with sometimes erotic content, dies at age 55.

== 1805 ==
- November: Pehr Nordquist, Swedish comics artist (Päder Målare och Munthen), dies at age 34.

== 1807 ==
- Hermanus van Lubeek, Dutch woodcut artist (made catchpenny prints with picture stories), dies at age 36 or 37.

== 1811 ==
- April: Isaac Cruikshank, Scottish cartoonist (Female Opinions on Military Tactics, The Humours of Belvoir Castle - or the Morning After), dies of alcohol poisoning at age 47.

== 1814 ==
- February 26: Johan Tobias Sergel, Swedish comics artist (Prästen och Flickan), dies at age 74.

== 1815 ==
- James Gillray, British cartoonist (French Liberty, British Slavery, John Bull's Progress, The Tables Turn'd, Democracy, or a Sketch of the Life of Buonaparte), dies at age 57.

== 1819 ==
- November 13: Dirk van Lubeek, Dutch woodcut artist (made catchpenny prints with picture stories), dies at age 72.

== 1820 ==
- Specific date unknown: William Charles, Scottish-American cartoonist (Tom, the Piper's Son), dies at age 43 or 44.

== 1822 ==
- May 5: Gerrit Oortman, Dutch woodcut artist (made catchpenny prints with picture stories), dies at age 41.

== 1823 ==
- May 5: Jan Oortman, Dutch woodcut artist (made catchpenny prints with picture stories), dies at age 59.

== 1827 ==
- April 21: Thomas Rowlandson, British cartoonist, illustrator and comics artist (Two New Sliders For The State Magic Lantern, The Loves of the Fox and the Badger, or the Coalition Wedding, Johnny Newcome, Dr. Syntax), dies at age 70.
- Specific date unknown: Robert Branston, British engraver, illustrator and comics artist (The Comical Cat), dies at age 38 or 39.

== 1831 ==
- December 18: Willem Bilderdijk, Dutch poet and creator of an early unpublished comic (Hanepoot), dies at age 75.

== 1836 ==
- April 20: Robert Seymour, British caricaturist and cartoonist, commits suicide at the age of 38.

== 1840 ==
- April 7: William Heath, British caricaturist (History of a Coat), dies at age 46 or 47.

== 1843 ==
- April 11: David Hess, Swiss painter, illustrator, writer, politician and caricaturist (Hollandia Regenerata), dies at age 72.

== 1845 ==
- Hilmar Johannes Backer, Dutch illustrator and comics artist (De Geschiedenis van Mijnheer Kardoes en Mejuffrouw Muizenschrik), dies at age 41 or 45.

== 1846 ==
- June 8: Rodolphe Töpffer, Swiss comics artist (Histoire de Mr. Vieux Bois), dies at age 47.
- June 28: Richard de Querelles, French comic artist (Le Déluge à Bruxelles), dies at age 35.

== 1847 ==
- March 17: Jean Ignace Isidore Gérard Grandville, French illustrator, caricaturist and early comics artist (Métamorphoses du Jour), dies at age 43.

== 1848 ==
- Johann Hermann Detmold and Adolph Schroedter publish Herr Piepmeyer.

== 1849 ==
- April 18: Hokusai, Japanese illustrator, manga artist and painter, dies.

== 1850 ==
- Charles Jameson Grant, British illustrator, engraver and comics artist (Adventures of the Buggins's), dies at age 30.

== 1856 ==
- March 13: Isaac Robert Cruikshank, British cartoonist and caricaturist (Every Man on His Perch, of Going to Hobby Fair, The National Pop-Shop in Threadneedle Street), dies at age 66.
- March 17: Johann Hermann Detmold, German jurist, novelist, politician, artist and comics writer (Herr Piepmeyer), dies at age 48.

== 1857 ==
- December 31: Edward Williams Clay, American political cartoonist and comic artist (Lessons in Dancing, Life in Philadelphia, The Seven Stages of The Office Seeker, This Is The House That Jack Built), dies at age 58.

== 1861 ==
- April 14: Utagawa Kuniyoshi, Japanese painter, illustrator and comics artist, dies at age 63.

== 1864 ==
- October 29: John Leech, British caricaturist and illustrator (Mr. Briggs), dies at age 47.

== 1865 ==
- November 8: David Claypoole Johnston, American political cartoonist, dies at age 65.
- John McLenan, American illustrator, caricaturist and comics artist (Mr. Slim, The Flight of Abraham), dies at age 37–38.

== 1866 ==
- December 30: Victor Adam, French painter, illustrator, lithographer and comics artist (made early text comics), dies at age 66.

== 1867 ==
- April 2: Charles H. Bennett, British illustrator (made early text comics), dies at age 38.

== 1868 ==
- March 13: Francisco Augusto Noguiera da Silva, a.k.a. Flora, Portuguese illustrator and comics artist (Aventuras sentimentais e dramáticas do senhor Simplício Baptista, Index da Physiologia, As Quatro Luas do Matrimónio), dies at age 37.

== 1869 ==
- June 6: Alexander Cranendoncq, Dutch woodcut artist (made catchpenny prints with picture stories), dies at age 69.

== 1872 ==
- January 19: Friedrich Lossow, German painter, illustrator and comics artist (Der Vergebliche Rattenjagd), dies at age 34.
- May 26: Alfred Henry Forrester, better known as Alfred Crowquill, British illustrator and comics artist, dies at age 67.

== 1873 ==
- December 13: Pieter van Loon, Dutch graphic artist, illustrator and comic artist (Spotprent Op De Plannen Tot De Oprichting Van Een Girobank), dies at age 73.

== 1875 ==
- December 9: Adolf Schroedter, German graphic artist, painter and comics artist (Herr Piepmeyer), dies at age 70.

== 1877 ==
- April 16: Tomas Padró, Spanish painter, caricaturist, illustrator and comics artist (Las Delicias de la Torre), dies at age 37.
- August 11: Carl Reinhardt, German painter, caricaturist, illustrator and comics artist (Meister Lapp und sein Lehrjunge Pips), dies at age 59.

== 1878 ==
- February 1: George Cruikshank, British cartoonist and caricaturist (The Comic Alphabet, Jack Sheppard, Mr. Lambkin, The Preparatory School for Fast Men, The Tooth-Ache), dies at age 85.

== 1879 ==
- February 10: Honoré Daumier, French cartoonist, illustrator and graphic artist (Les Poires), dies at age 70.
- September 6: Amédée de Noé, a.k.a. Cham, French illustrator, cartoonist, caricaturist and comics artist, (Mr. Lajaunisse, Mr. Lamélasse, Deux Vieilles Filles Vaccinées à Marier, Un Génie Incompris (M. Barnabé Gogo), Impressions de Voyage de Monsieur Boniface), dies at age 61.

== 1882 ==
- March 24: Bertall, French illustrator, novelist, caricaturist, photographer and comics artist (Défauts des Enfants, Les Romans Populaires Illustrés), dies at age 61.
- November 15: Henrique Fleiuss, German-Brazilian painter, caricaturist, engraver and publisher (founder of the Brazilian humor magazine Semana Ilustrada), dies at age 58.

== 1883 ==
- December 10: Richard Doyle, British illustrator, caricaturist, cartoonist and comics artist (Brown, Jones and Robinson), dies at age 59.

== 1884 ==
- January 23: Gustave Doré, French illustrator (Les Travaux d'Hercule, Trois Artistes incompris et mécontents and Histoire Pittoresque de la Sainte Russie) dies at age 51.
- August 18: Léonce Petit: French illustrator, caricaturist and engraver (Histoires campagnardes, Les Mésaventures de M. Bêton), dies.

== 1885 ==
- May 1: André Gill, French illustrator, cartoonist, caricaturist and comics artist (L'Amateur de Violon), dies at age 44 in a mental asylum.

== 1886 ==
- October 10: Alain Humbert, French illustrator, caricaturist and comics artist (Boquillon), dies at age 51.
- November 5: Christiaan Le Blansch, Dutch illustrator, engraver and comics artist (Politiek Gesprek Vóór De Verkiezingen), dies at age 58.

== 1888 ==
- June 2: William Giles Baxter, British comics artist (continued Ally Sloper), dies at age 32 from TBC.

== 1890 ==
- 1890: Émilie de Tessier, French comics artist (Ally Sloper), dies at age 42 or 43.
- May 27: Kobayashi Eitaku, Japanese illustrator, painter and prototypical manga artist (Decomposition of the corpse of a courtisane), dies at age 47.
- August 20: Jan Holswilder, Dutch illustrator, painter, lithographer and comics artist (No. 13, het ongeluksnummer), dies at age 39.

== 1891 ==
- January 4: Charles Keene, British cartoonist and comics artist (The Adventures of Miss Lavinia Brounjones, Our American Cousin in Europe), dies at age 67.
- July 19: Ramón Escaler, Spanish illustrator and comics artist (created comics for La Semana Cómica), dies at age 30 or 31.

== 1892 ==
- June 9: Yoshitoshi Tsukioka, Japanese illustrator and prototypical comics artist, dies at age 53.
- Specific date unknown: Elemér Jankó, Hungarian illustrator and comic artist, dies at age 20.

=== 1893 ===
- February 13: Victor Armand Poirson, French illustrator (made picture stories for Le National Illustré), dies at age 34.

== 1894 ==
- February 19: Joseph Keppler, Austrian-American cartoonist, comics artist and founder of the satirical magazine Puck.
- September 20: Heinrich Hoffmann, German psychiatrist, novelist and illustrator (Der Struwwelpeter), dies at age 85.

== 1895 ==
- March 16: Henry George Hine, British painter, cartoonist and comics artist (Mr. Crindle's Rapid Career Upon Town), dies at age 83.
- September 15: Hector Berthelot, Canadian journalist, columnist, lawyer, publisher and cartoonist (founder of the satirical cartoon magazines Le Canard, Le Vrai Canard, Le Grognard, original author of the novel series Père Ladébauche, which was later adapted into a comics series by Joseph Charlebois), dies at age 53.

== 1896 ==
- March 29: János Jankó, Hungarian illustrator, caricaturist and comics artist (Gömböcz and Csukli, Hungarian Miska and German Miska. An old fairy tale about a common mule), dies at age 62.

== 1897 ==
- May 28: Alexander VerHuell, Dutch novelist, illustrator and comics artist (Zijn er zoo?, Zoo zijn er), dies at age 85.
- October 12: Charles Henry Ross, British comics writer and cartoonist (Ally Sloper), dies at age 62.

== 1898 ==
- July 29: Mecachis, Spanish caricaturist, illustrator and comics artist, dies at age 38 or 39.

== 1899 ==
- September 5: Louis Morel-Retz, a.k.a. Stop, French caricaturist, illustrator, cartoonist and comics artist (Les Aventures de Monsieur Verdreau), dies at age 74.
- October 4: Paul Léonnec, French illustrator and comics artist, dies at age 57.
