= Slave Compensation Act 1837 =

Act of the Parliament of the United Kingdom

- Act of Parliament
- Parliament of the United Kingdom
- Long title: An Act to carry into further Execution the Provisions of an Act for completing the full Payment of Compensation to Owners of Slaves upon the Abolition of Slavery.
- Citation: 1 & 2 Vict. c. 3
- Territorial extent: United Kingdom

Dates
- Royal assent: 23 December 1837
- Commencement: 23 December 1837 (Note: The Acts of Parliament (Commencement) Act 1793.)
- Repealed: 7 August 1874
Other legislation
Repealed by	Statute Law Revision Act 1874 (No. 2)
Relates to	Slavery Abolition Act 1833; Abolition of Slavery Act 1836

Status: Repealed

Text of statute as originally enacted

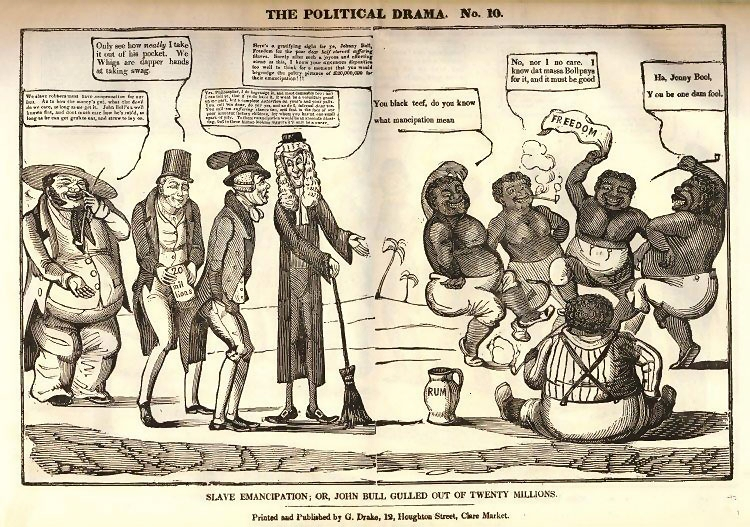
"Slave Emancipation; Or, John Bull Gulled Out Of Twenty Millions", by C.J. Grant, c. 1837

The Slave Compensation Act 1837 (1 & 2 Vict. c. 3) was an act of the Parliament of the United Kingdom, signed into law on 23 December 1837.

Together with the Slavery Abolition Act 1833 (3 & 4 Will. 4. c. 73), it authorized the Commissioners for the Reduction of the National Debt to compensate slave owners in the British colonies in the amount of approximately £20 million for the freeing of slaves. Based on a government census of 1 August 1834, more than 40,000 awards to slave owners were issued. Since some of the payments were converted into 3.5% government annuities, they lasted until 2015.

== History ==
After decades of campaigning, the Slavery Abolition Act 1833 (3 & 4 Will. 4. c. 73) was passed. The plantation owners in the Caribbean, represented by the London Society of West India Planters and Merchants (now the West India Committee), had opposed abolition. The 1837 act paid substantial amount of money constituting 40% of the Treasury’s tax receipts at the time to the former slave owners, but nothing to the liberated people.

The act empowered the Commissioners for the Reduction of the National Debt, under the direction of the Treasury, to either pay the compensation that was still owing to slave owners out of the West India Compensation Account, or to transfer a proportionate amount of 3.5% government annuities. The various acts of William IV relating to slave compensation were to be considered, as far as applicable, to apply to this act.

Slave owners were paid approximately £20 million in compensation in more than 40,000 awards for enslaved people freed in the colonies of the Caribbean, Mauritius and the Cape of Good Hope, according to a government census that named all owners as of 1 August 1834. This represented around 40 per cent of the British Treasury's annual spending budget, and has been calculated as equivalent to around £16.5bn in today's terms. Approximately half went to absentee landlords in the UK, while the rest went to slave-owners in Africa and the West Indies. The largest total amount paid in compensation was to Sir John Gladstone, 1st Baronet, father of prime minister William Gladstone, who was paid £106,769 (enough to purchase goods that would cost about £10.3m in 2021, or labour worth about £95m at 2021 prices) in compensation for 2,508 enslaved men, women and children across nine plantations that had been Gladstone's property before the passage of the 1833 Act.

Payments of the bonds to the descendants of creditors was only finalised in 2015 when the British Government decided to modernise the gilt portfolio by redeeming all remaining undated gilts. The long gap between this money being borrowed and the final repayment of any portion that may still have been outstanding was due to the type of financial instrument that was used, rather than the amount of money borrowed.

British historian Nicholas Draper, in his book The Price of Emancipation: Slave-Ownership, Compensation and British Society at the End of Slavery, states that "Nathan Rothschild and his brother-in-law Moses Montefiore led a syndicate underwriting the issue of three new series of securities to raise £15 million: we don’t know how much they distributed or sub-underwrote. A further £5 million was paid out directly in government stock".

== Legacy and evaluation ==
The Slavery Abolition Act 1833 (3 & 4 Will. 4. c. 73) contained provision for payments to slave owners in Cape of Good Hope, Mauritius, and the Virgin Islands as compensation for their loss of property in order to persuade them to allow the legislation to be passed. The Slave Compensation Act 1837 widened the compensation to cover the owner of any African slave in any colony. About a quarter of the compensation was paid in Reduced Annuities, which were quickly sold and the money sent to the claimants abroad. As a consequence, the financial crisis of the mid-1830s was worsened, causing distress and unemployment to working people in Britain.

The whole act was repealed by section 1 of, and the schedule to, the Statute Law Revision Act 1874 (No. 2) (37 & 38 Vict. c. 96), which came into force on 9 August 1844.

The Centre for the Study of the Legacies of British Slave-ownership was created in 2010 to research the effects of slavery on British history, including the Slave Compensation Act 1837. It incorporated a University College London project called Legacies of British Slave-ownership which aimed to list the individuals who received compensation. They estimate that 10–20% of Britain's wealthy can be identified as having had links to slavery, ranging in their level of connection. The centre has since been renamed the Centre for the Study of the Legacies of British Slavery, reflecting a change of emphasis towards the enslaved.

== See also ==
- Emancipation of the British West Indies
- Reparations for slavery
