= Karl Reinhardt =

Karl Reinhardt may refer to:

- Karl Reinhardt (bobsleigh), German Olympic bobsledder
- Karl Reinhardt (philologist) (1886–1958)
- Karl Reinhardt (mathematician) (1895–1941), mathematician

== See also ==
- Carl Reinhardt (1818–1877)
- Karl Reinhard (1761–1837)
