= Kobayashi Eitaku =

Japanese painter (1843–1890)

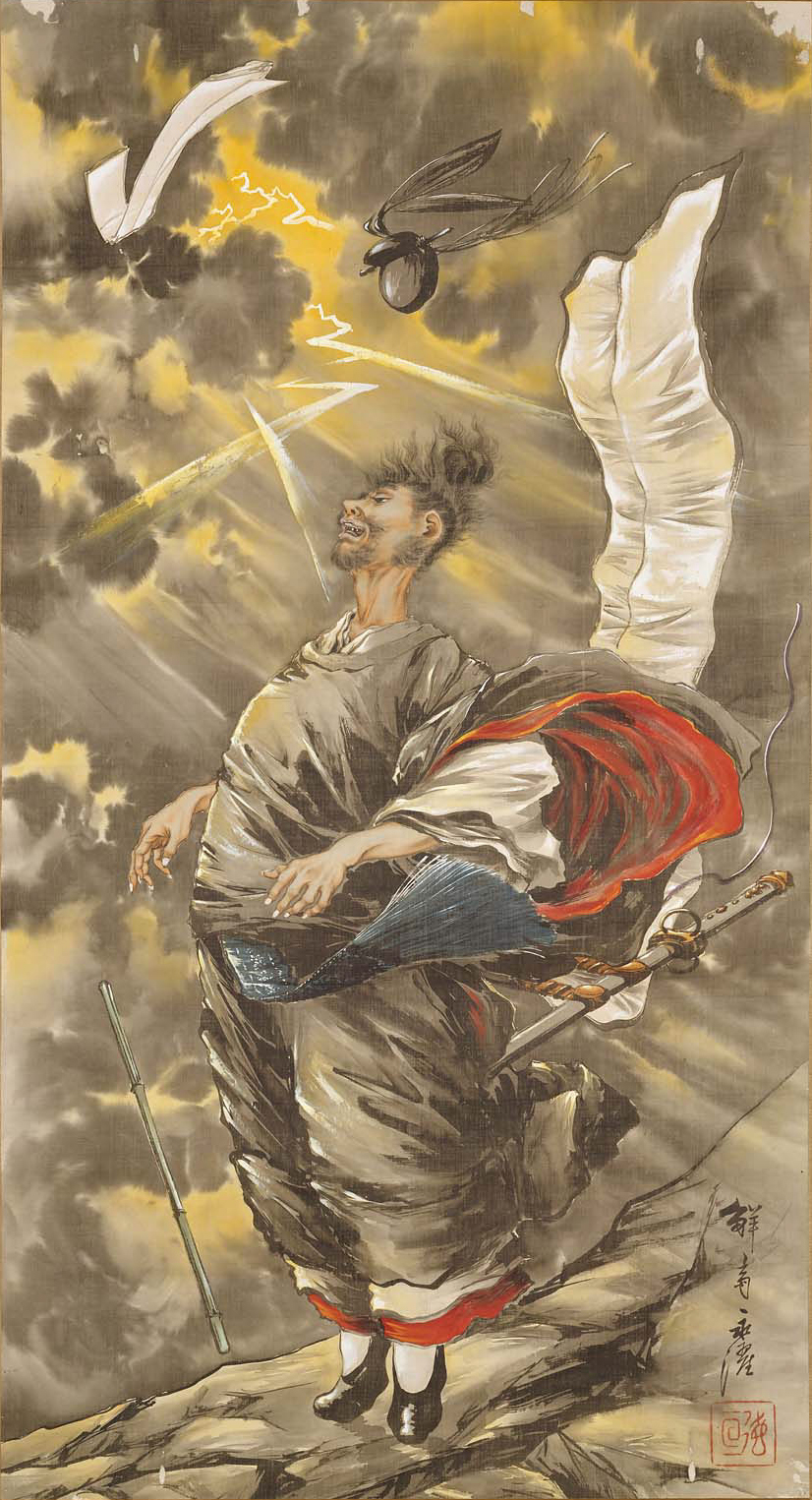
Hanging scroll painting of Sugawara Michizane Praying on Tenpai-zan, 1880

Kobayashi Eitaku (小林 永濯, 22 April 1843 – 27 May 1890) was a Japanese artist and illustrator specializing in ukiyo-e and nihonga.

== Biography ==
Eitaku was born 22 April 1843, a third son of Miura Kichisaburo, a fishmonger at Nihonbashi Uogashi. He became the adopted son of Kanō Eishin, and at the age of 12 or 13 he became an apprentice under the Kanō school painter Kanō Eitoku Tatsunobu. A few years later he started to work for Ii Naosuke of Ii clan in Hikone as an official painter, and was given a samurai status. Ii Naosuke was assassinated in 1860, after that Eitaku started travel through the country, and then settled in Nihonbashi.

After he left the Kanō school to produce ukiyo-e, it is said that the ukiyo-e painter Kawanabe Kyōsai took care of him. He studied different styles of painting, both Ming and Western; he studied ukiyo-e with Yoshitoshi and started to produce colourful prints after c. 1870. He also worked as an illustrator for several newspapers, including the ''Yokohama Mainichi Shimbun'', the ''Eiri Jiyū Shinbun'' and the ''Kakushu Shinbun Zukai no Uchi'', and created illustration for books, including the ehon Banbutsu Hinagata Gafu and Sensai Eitaku Gafu.

Eitaku's work long suffered the same low critical esteem in Japan as that of his contemporary, late-era ukiyo-e artists. It was valued more highly in the West—his painting Sugawara Michizane Praying on Tenpai-zan (道真天拝山祈禱の図 Michizane Tempaizan kitō no zu, 1880) won a place in the Museum of Fine Arts, Boston.

Eitaku's principal artistic output consisted of bunmei kaika-e prints depicting the changing face of Meiji-era Japan, in a manner similar to those of Kuniteru II; among his subjects was the Ryōunkaku, Tokyo's and Japan's first Western-style skyscraper, which he depicted in a series of woodblock prints.

== Gallery ==
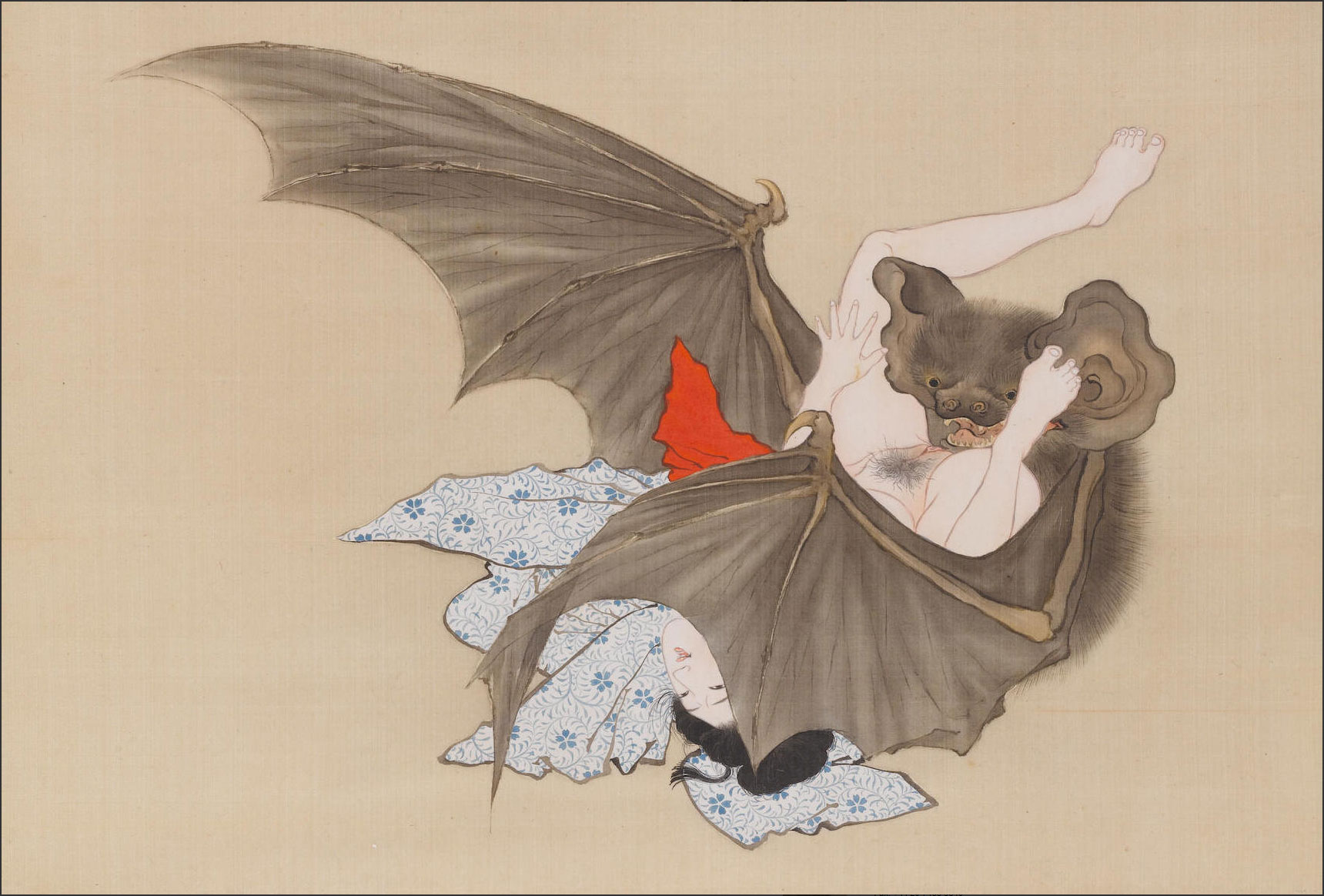

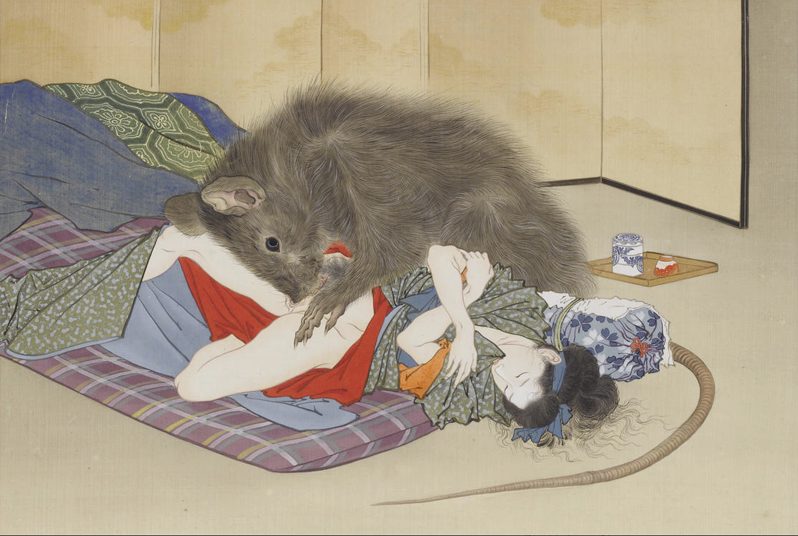

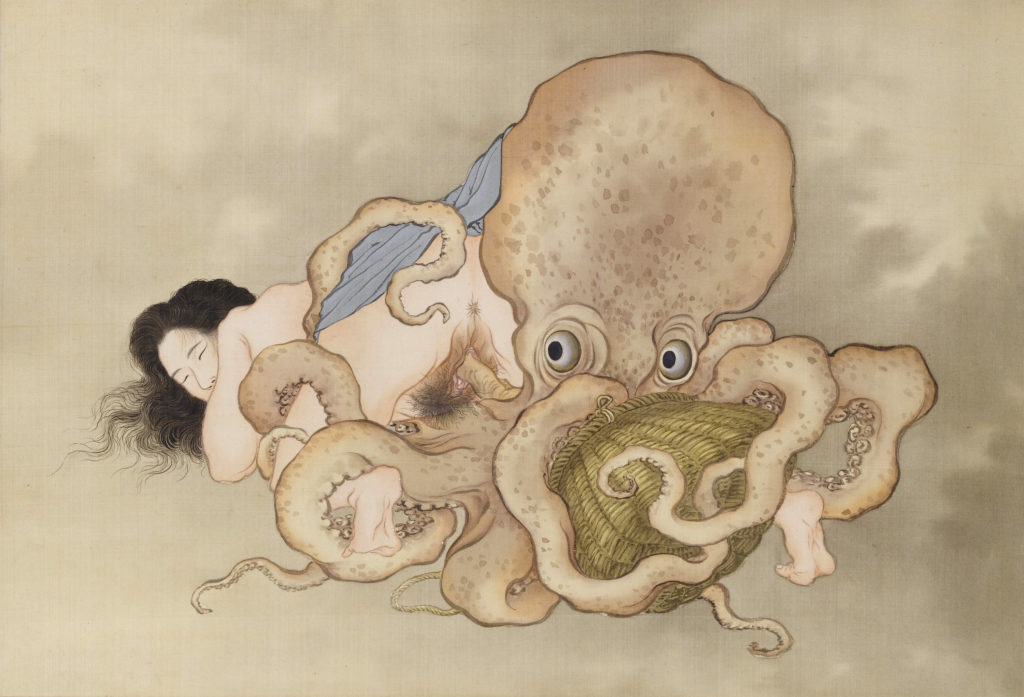

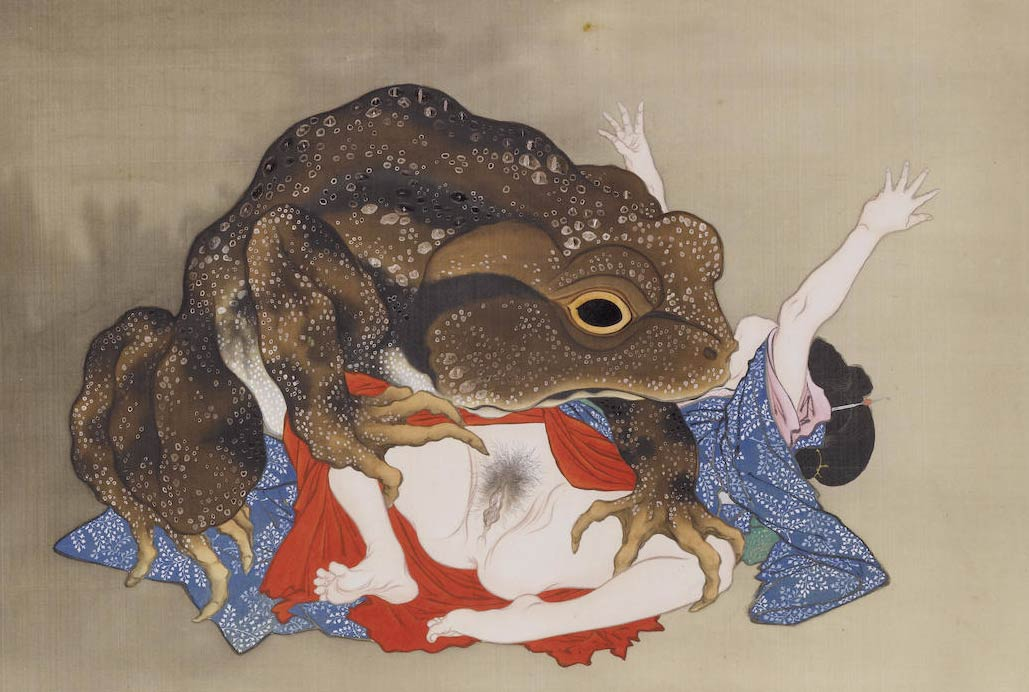

Battle of Tabaruzaka

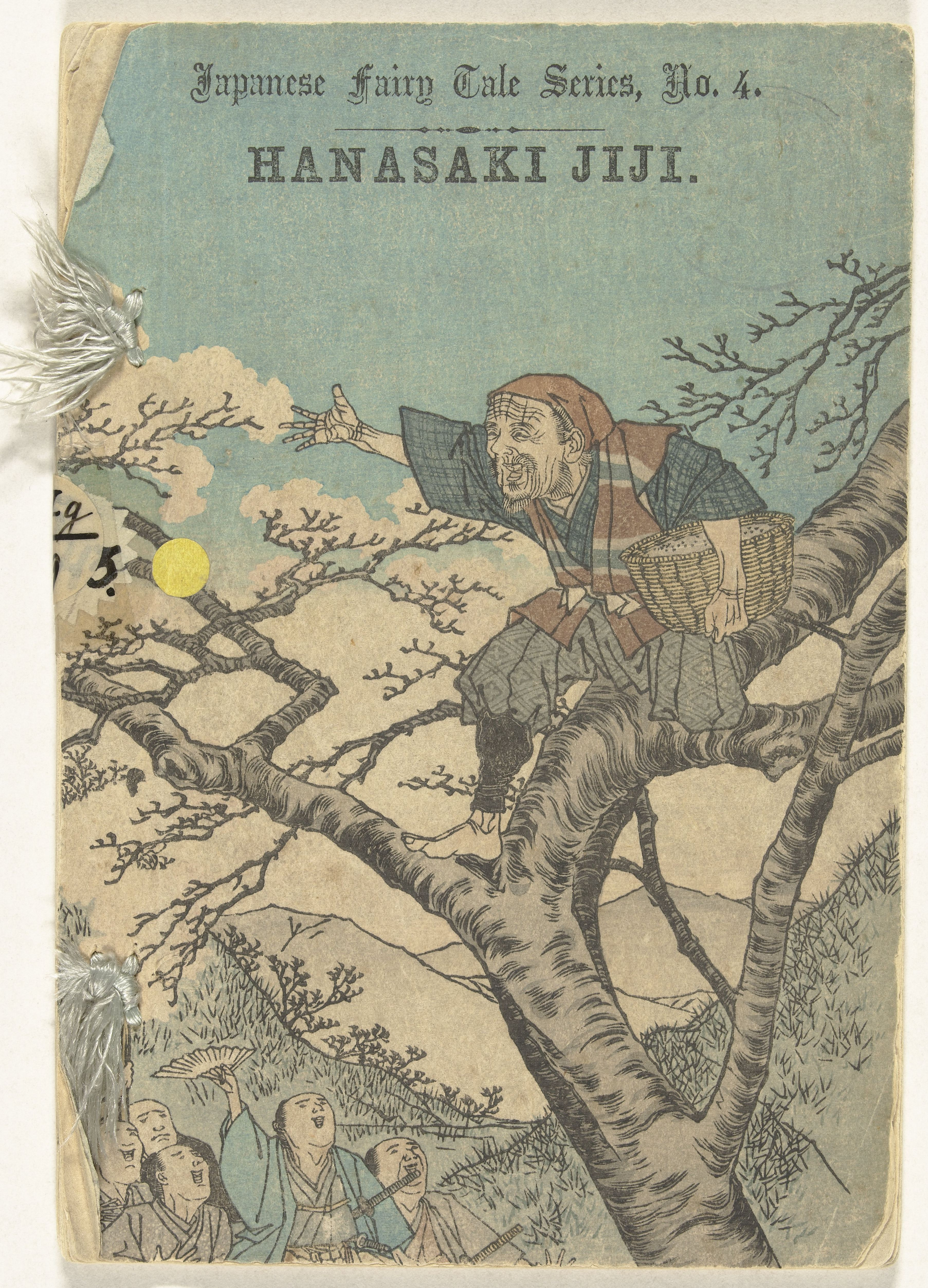
Cover of Hanasaki Jiji book

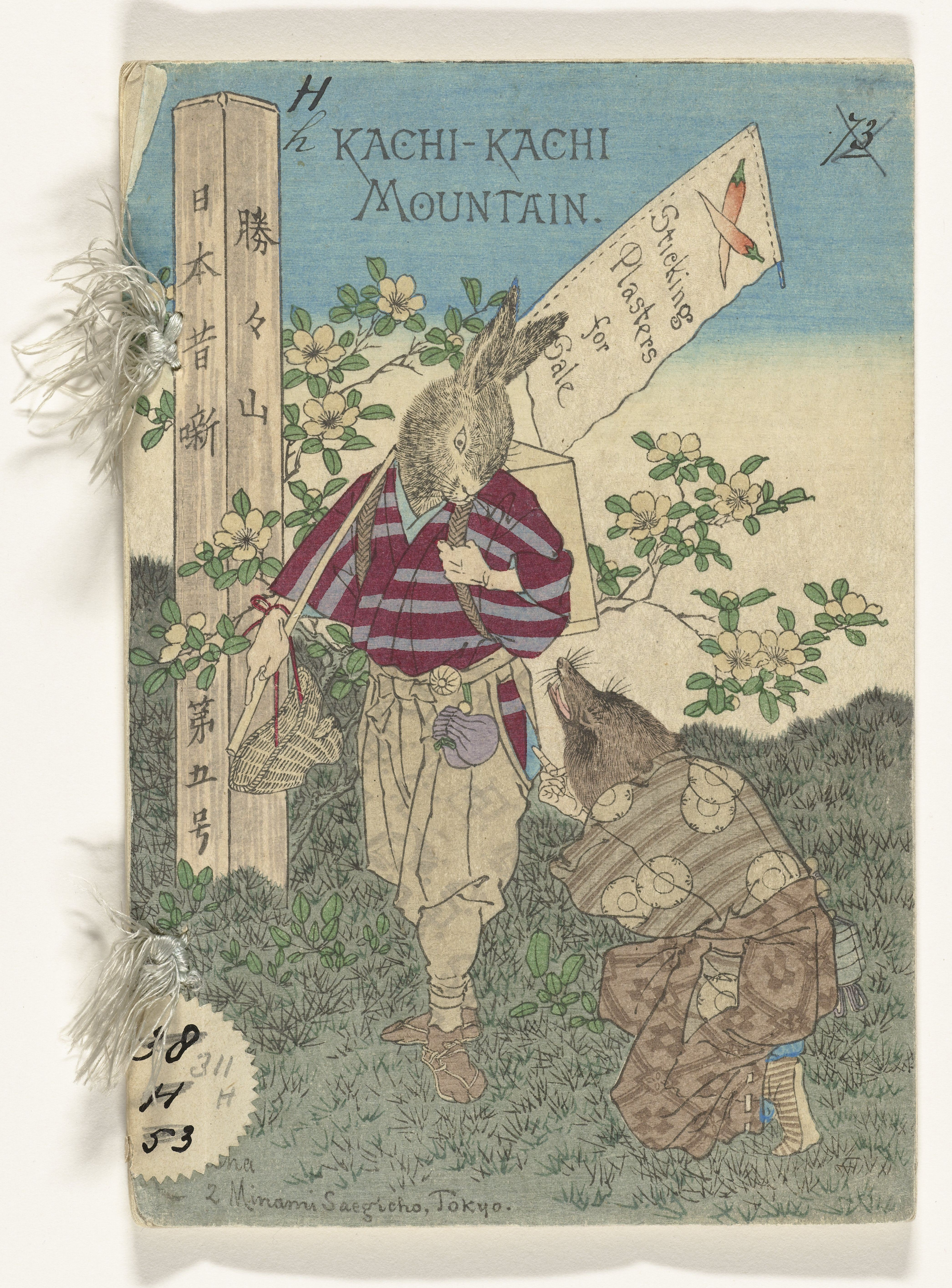
Cover of Kaki-kachi mountain book
