= Jan van den Aveelen =

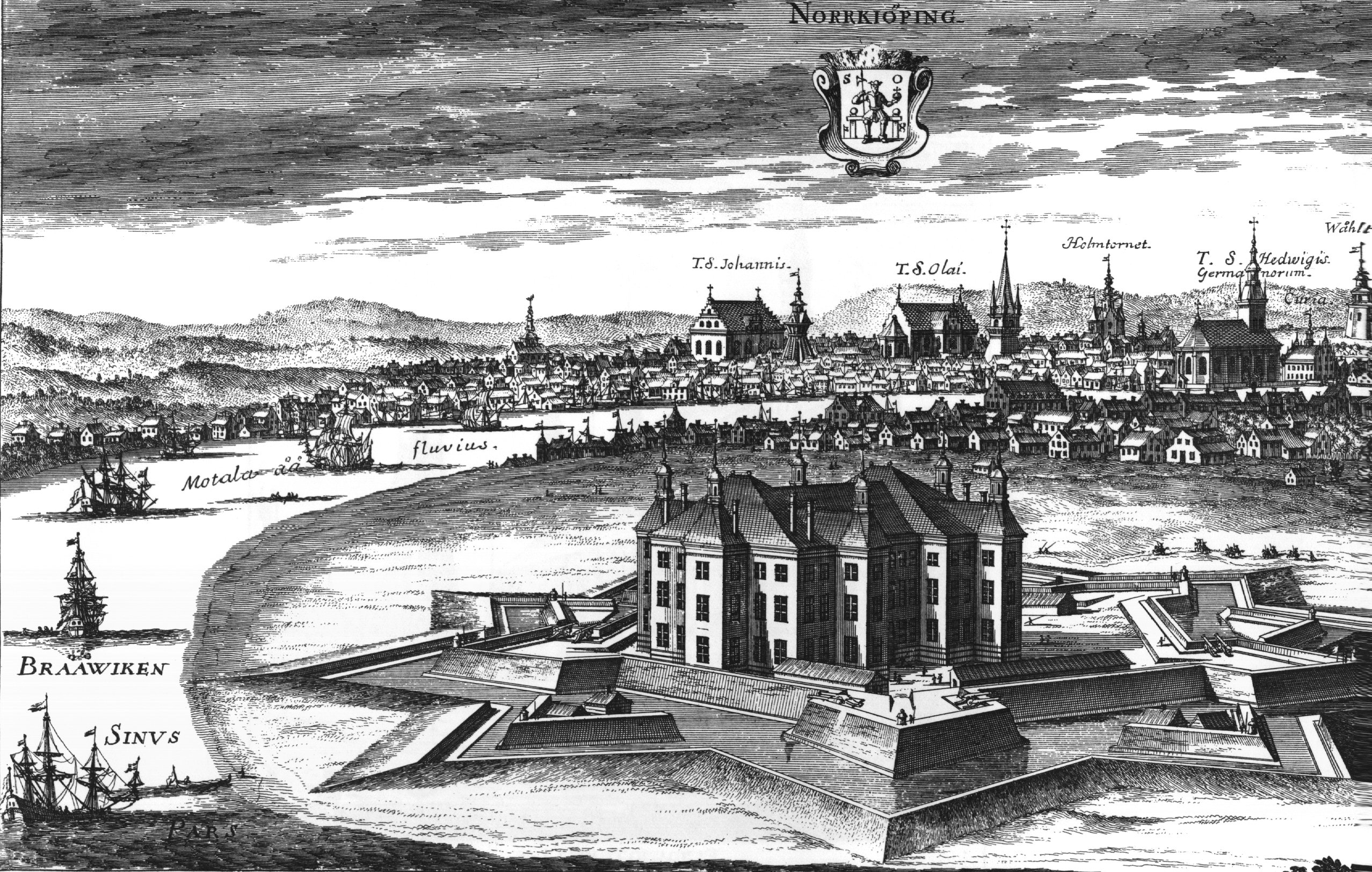
Engraving of Norrköping, Sweden, by Jan van den Aveele

Jan van den Aveele or Aveelen (c. 1650 - 18 May 1727) was a Dutch etcher and copper engraver.

Van den Aveele was born in Leiden, Dutch Republic. With compatriot Willem Swidde, he made engravings for Suecia Antiqua et Hodierna (Ancient and Modern Sweden) including depictions of public buildings and city scapes in Stockholm and other Swedish cities.

Some of his works make use of sequential illustrations, making him an early example of a prototypical comic artist.

Van den Aveele died in Stockholm, Sweden.
