= William Charles (cartoonist) =

American cartoonist

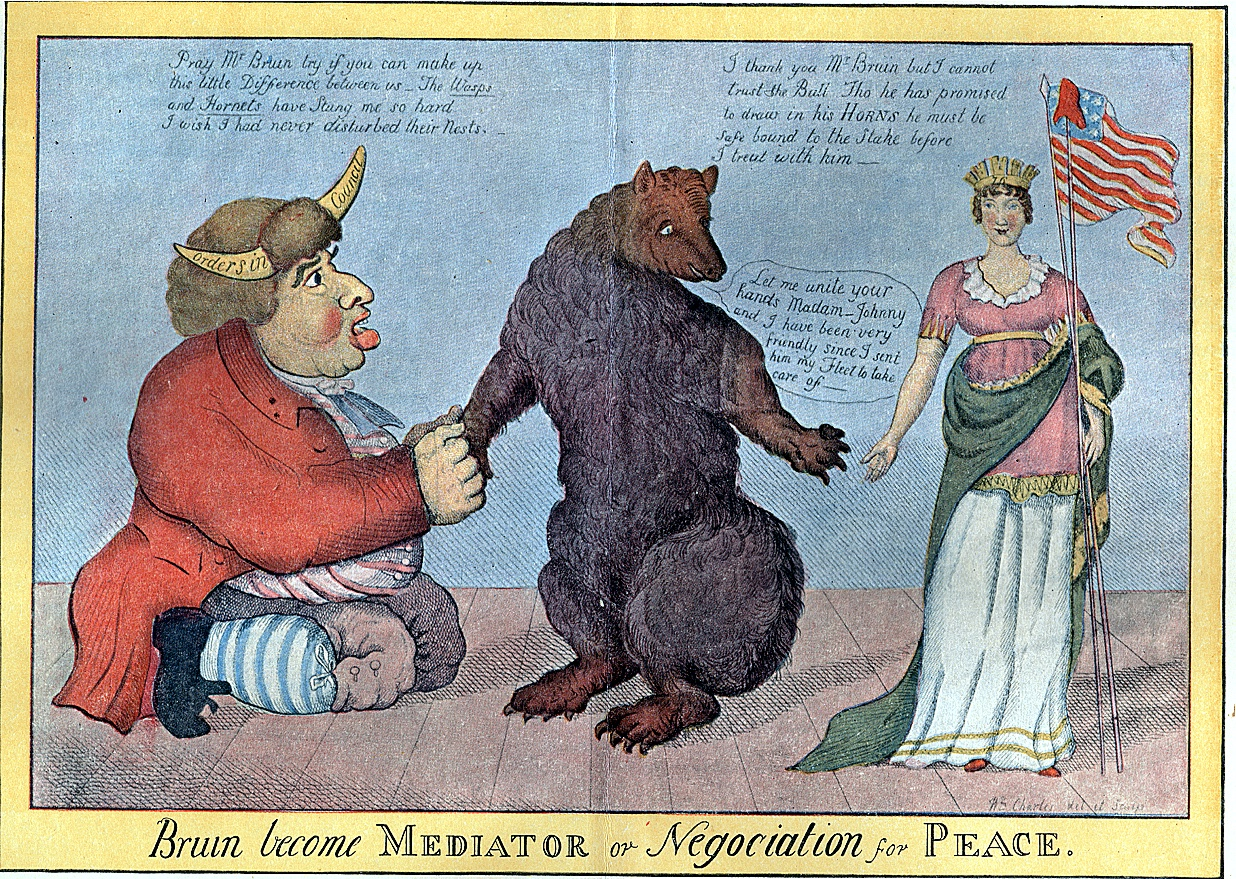
Bruin become Mediator or Negotiation for Peace c. 1813 by the artist

William Charles (1776–1820) was a Scottish-born engraver who emigrated to the United States and is now known best for his political cartoons, especially "The Hartford Convention or LEAP NO LEAP", perhaps the most widely printed illustration regarding that historic subject. He is also notable for being a pioneer in comics.

== Life and career ==
He was born in Edinburgh but little is known about his early life and training. Charles had published political caricatures in Edinburgh and London before immigrating to America. He worked extensively in New York and Philadelphia from about 1806 until his death.

"Charles ... must be regarded as an instrumental figure in transferring the techniques and vocabulary of the English caricaturists to an American context," according to Lorraine Welling Lanmon.

Satirical cartoons were his forte, but he also created landscapes and book illustrations. He worked in etching, line and stipple engraving, as well as aquatint.

"His work rarely reached significant artistic heights", Lanmon wrote in an article on Charles. He was "neither an expert draftsman nor an accomplished technician" although some of his works showed expertise in both draftsmanship and technique, she wrote.

His most well-known cartoons concern the War of 1812.

== Individual cartoons ==
=== Bruin Become MEDIATOR or Negotiation for PEACE ===
The cartoon (shown at the top of this article), was engraved by Charles in New York City in about 1813 and refers to the English-Russian War of 1812. Charles depicts John Bull (Britain), Columbia (the United States) and a bruin (the bear traditionally representing Russia).

Dialogue (from left to right):

John Bull: Pray Mr Bruin try if you can make up this little Difference between us-The Wasps and Hornets have Stung me so hard I wish I had never disturbed their Nests.

Bruin: Let me unite your hands Madam-Johny and I have been very friendly since I sent him my Fleet to take care of----

Columbia: I thank you Mr Bruin but I cannot trust the Bull. 'Tho he has promised to draw his HORNS he must be safe bound to the Stake before I treat with him.

=== The Hartford Convention or LEAP NO LEAP ===
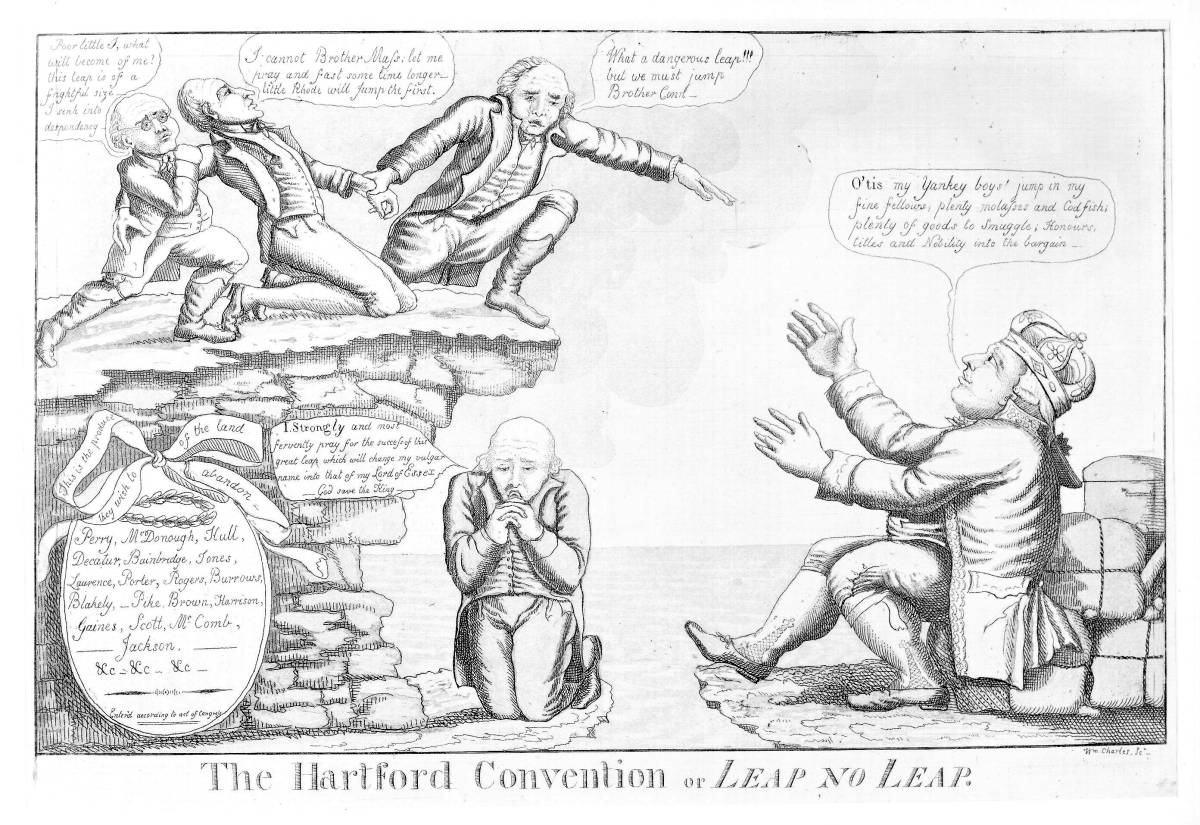
The Hartford Convention or LEAP NO LEAP by the artist

The 1814 cartoon attacks the Hartford Convention, a series of secret meetings New England Federalists held in December of that year. Charles caricatures radical secessionist leader Timothy Pickering and also depicts as characters the convention members Rhode Island, Massachusetts, and Connecticut, along with British King George III.

Pickering is shown on his knees in the center, saying: "I, Strongly and most fervently pray for the success of this great leap which will change my vulgar name into that of my Lord of Essex. God save the King." (Pickering lived in Essex County, Massachusetts.)

On a cliff above him, Massachusetts, pulls Rhode Island and Connecticut toward the edge.

Massachusetts says: What a dangerous leap!!! but we must jump Brother Conn.

Connecticut: I cannot Brother Mass; let me pray and fast some time longer—little Rhode will jump the first.

Rhode Island: Poor little I, what will become of me? this leap is of a frightful size—I sink into despondency.

On the right, George III calls: "O'tis my Yankey boys! jump in my fine fellows; plenty molasses and Codfish; plenty of goods to Smuggle; Honours, titles and Nobility into the bargain."

In the lower lefthand corner is a medallion inscribed with the names of Perry, McDonough, Hull, and other heroes of the War of 1812. The ribbon on the medallion reads, "This is the produce of the land they wish to abandon."

The cartoon, an etching, was published in Philadelphia by Samuel Kennedy in 1814. Charles signed the piece, "Wm Charles, Sc.[ulpsit]".

=== JOHNNY BULL and the ALEXANDRIANS ===
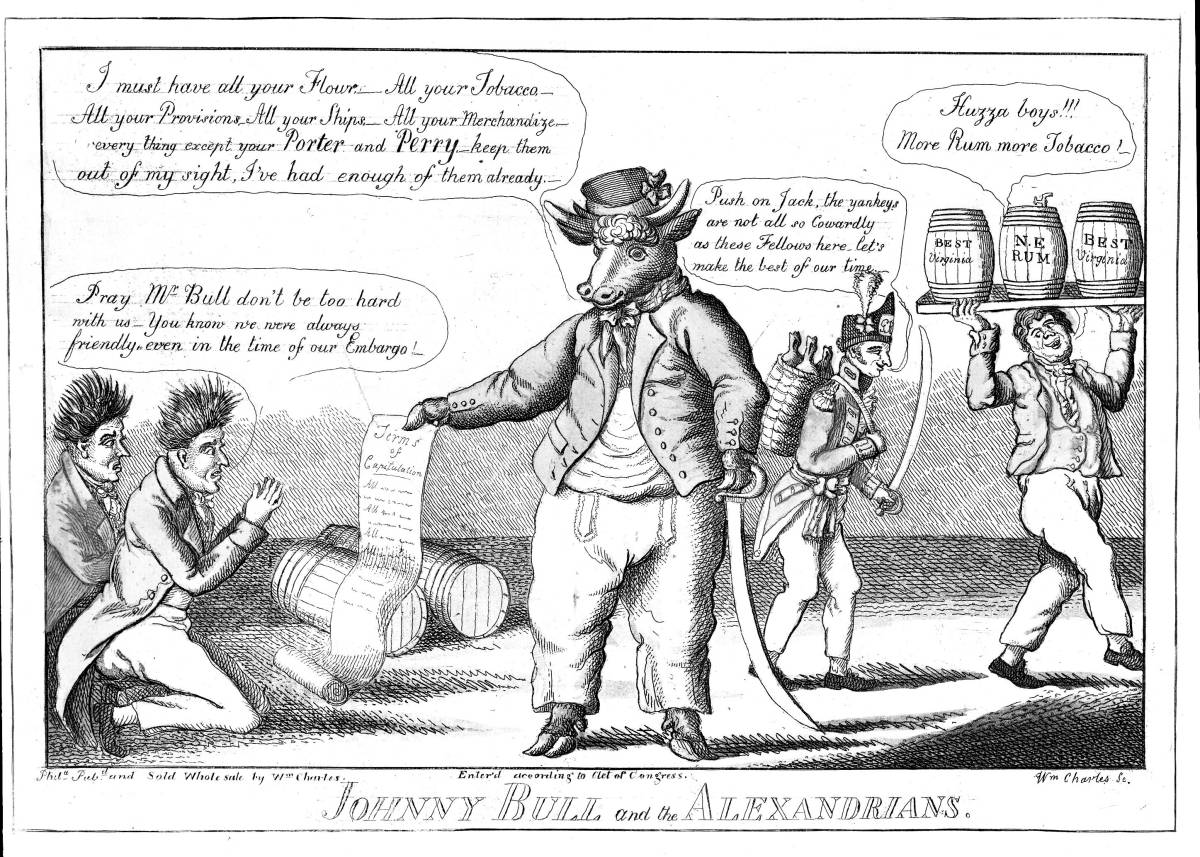
JOHNNY BULL and the ALEXANDRIANS (1814)

The British seized Alexandria, Virginia (across the Potomac from Washington, D.C. in 1814. Charles here ridicules the townspeople for their lack of serious resistance to the enemy.

Etching produced in Philadelphia. ("Pubd. and Sold... by Wm. Charles" and "Wm. Charles Sc.[ulpsit]".)

Description:

Johnny Bull (with the head of a bull): I must have all your Flour---All your Tobacco---All your Provisions---All your ships---All your Merchandize---Every thing except your Porter and Perry keep them out of my sight, I 've had enough of them already.---

Yankey (one of two, kneeling, on left): Pray Mr Bull don't be too hard with us--- you know we were always friendly, even in time of your Embargo!

British Soldier: Push on Jack, the yankeys are not all so cowardly as these Fellows here. Let's make the best of your time.---

Jack: Huzza Boys!!! More Rum more Tobacco!---

David Porter and Oliver Perry were American heroes of the War of 1812.

=== JOHN BULL and the BALTIMOREANS ===
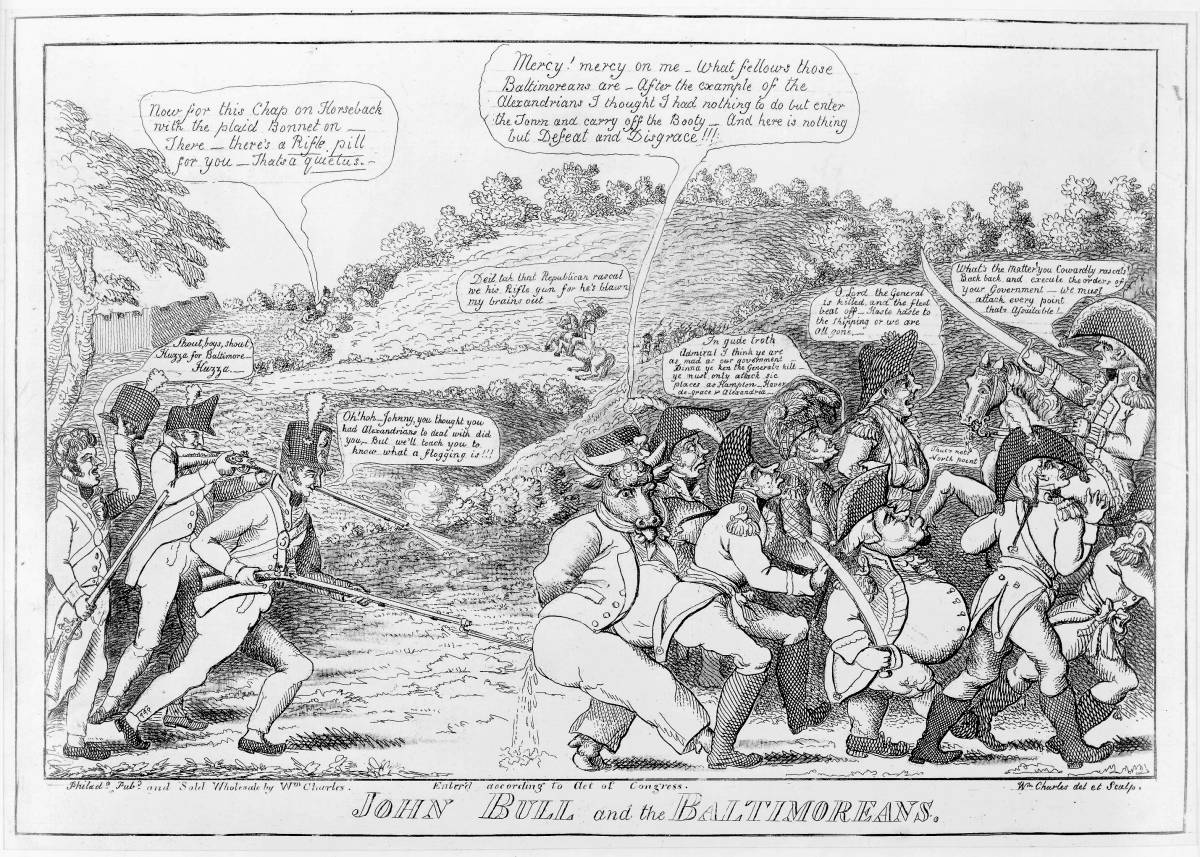
JOHN BULL and the BALTIMOREANS (1814)

The cartoon, an 1814 etching, with roulette work, was created in Philadelphia. ("Pubd. And sold ... by Wm. Charles")

The cartoon depicts the stiff resistance made in Baltimore to the British invaders (as opposed to the lack of resistance from Alexandria, Virginia, depicted above). Charles, despite being a native Scot, had no compunction in displaying Scots accents out of the mouths of the enemy in the dialogue here, perhaps for humorous reasons as well as accuracy.

Description:

American soldier prods John Bull (a bull in seaman's outfit) and says: "Oh! hoh! -- Johnny you thought you had Alexandrians to deal with did you -- But we'll teach you to know what a flogging is!!!"

John Bull: "Mercy! mercy on me -- What fellows those Baltimoreans are -- After the example of the Alexandrians I thought I had nothing to do but enter the Town and carry off the Booty -- And here is nothing but Defeat and Disgrace!!!"

On the right a mounted officer, possibly Admiral Cockburn urges the British to turn and fight: "What's the Matter! you Cowardly rascals! Back back and execute the orders of your Government --We must attack every point that's assailable!"

A Highlander replies: "In gude troth Admiral I think ye are as mad as our government Dinna ye ken the General's kilt -- ye must only attack sie places as Hampton, Havre de Grace, or Alexandria."

In the background an American sniper fires at mounted Scottish General Robert Ross.

Sniper: "Now for this Chap on Horseback with the plaid Bonnet on -- There -- there's a Rifle pill for you -- Thats a quietus."

Ross: "Deil [sic] tak that Republican rascal wi his Rifle gun for he's blawn my brains out."

== Other prominent works ==
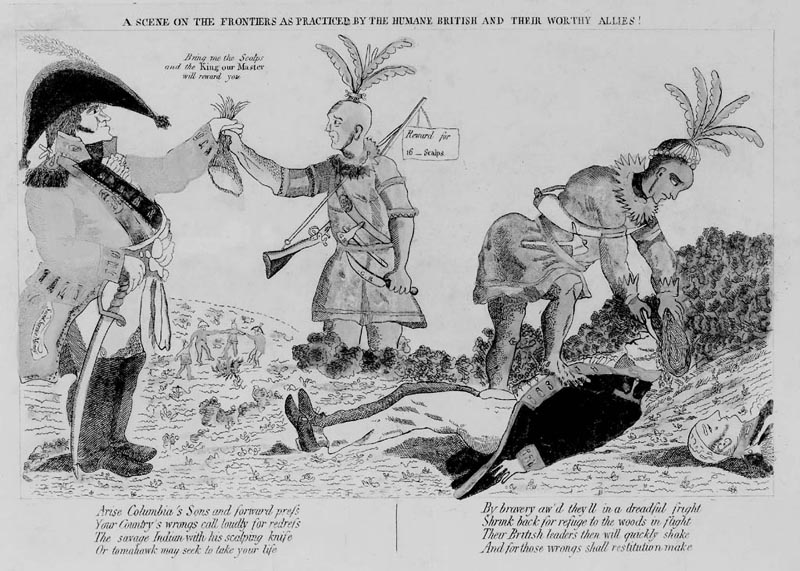
A Scene on the Frontiers as Practiced by the Humane British and Their Worthy Allies! (1812) Philadelphia

- John Bull making a new Batch of Ships to send to the Lakes (1814)—Philadelphia, "Pubd. And sold ... by Wm. Charles"
- Democracy - against the - Unnatural Union. Trial Octr. 14th 1817 (1817)—Possibly done in Philadelphia. Etching, with roulette work, "Designed and Executed by one who has neither place nor pension" Satirical, partisan take on the gubernatorial election in Pennsylvania between William Findlay and Joseph Heister.
