= Henry George Hine =

English landscape painter and comic illustrator

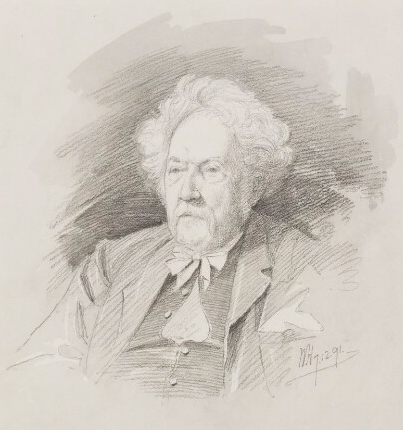
Henry George Hine, 1891, by Walker Hodgson

Henry George Hine VPRI, very often referred to as H.G. Hine (15 August 1811–16 March 1895) was an English landscape painter, mostly in watercolour, and in the early part of his career, comic illustrator.

South Downs Pastures, watercolour, Birmingham Museums Trust

His career was long, with new paintings exhibited in London exhibitions for 65 years. His mature style concentrated on wide views of the South Downs in his native Sussex, "noted for the[ir] delicacy and subtlety". Typically, few features beyond the gently curving hills are shown.

== Early life and landscape painting ==
Born at Brighton, Sussex, on 15 August 1811, he was the youngest son of William Hine, from Hampshire, by his marriage with Mary Roffey. His father was at one time coachman to Hester Thrale, and then a coachmaster in Brighton. He taught himself to draw and paint, and was encouraged by a neighbouring vicar who had water-colours by Copley Fielding.

Agglestone near Swanage, watercolour, 1870, Victoria and Albert Museum

Hine painted for some years in Sussex on sea-pieces and coastal scenes, then went to London and was apprenticed as a draughtsman to Henry Meyer. On leaving Meyer he went to Rouen and remained there about two years. He returned, first to Brighton, then to London, where he became a professional wood engraver, and in 1841 extended his practice to drawing on the wood for illustrated journals.

He usually signed his paintings as "HG Hine" (or sometimes just used "HGH") and often dated them. In 1863 Hine was elected an associate of the Institute of Painters in Water-colours, and exhibited St. Paul's from Fleet Street. He was elected a full member in 1864, and exhibited in the following year two Dorset subjects. From that time onwards he was a regular contributor to the exhibitions at the Institute, of which he was the vice-president from 1888 to 1895.

After his marriage in 1840, Hine spent most of his life in London or the northern suburbs; he lived in Highgate from 1856 to 1868, and in Hampstead from 1868 for the rest of his life. Several of his water-colours were exhibited at the Institute in the year of his death, which took place at Rosslyn Hill, Hampstead, on 16 March 1895. He was buried on the western side of Highgate Cemetery.

The following July the Fine Art Society in London held a memorial exhibition, which was reviewed favourably, as far away as the Glasgow Herald.

== Works ==
Eastbourne Beach, watercolour, 1873, Victoria and Albert Museum

Bible Bottom, near Lewes, 1881, Victoria and Albert Museum

Hine's style was based on that of Copley Fielding, who he knew well. By 1830, from Brighton, he contributed to London exhibitions, sending six pictures to the Royal Academy and 12 to the Suffolk Street Gallery between then and 1851. In 1856 he had three water-colours at Suffolk Street, and in 1859 an oil painting, Smugglers waiting for a Lugger, attracted attention at the Academy.

Hine's pictures included: Lewes from the Town Mill, On the Downs near Lewes, Swanage Bay, Cliffs at Cuckmere, In Cowdray Park, Haymaking, Corfe Castle, Moonlight, Shoreham, and Fittleworth Common. Some of these were sent in 1878 to the Paris Exhibition.

His paintings are in many British museums, with several in the Victoria and Albert Museum. Other groups are in Aberystwyth University School of Art Museum and Galleries, Eton College, Birmingham and the National Museum Cardiff. There is one, Pevensey Bay, Sussex, 1868 in the Yale Center for British Art, and another in the Art Institute of Chicago. His printed illustrations are in many libraries.

In 2003 the Towner Art Gallery in Eastbourne held an exhibition called "Henry George Hine, 1811-1895 : The South Downs in watercolour" with a catalogue (33pp) by Christopher Newall.

== As illustrator ==
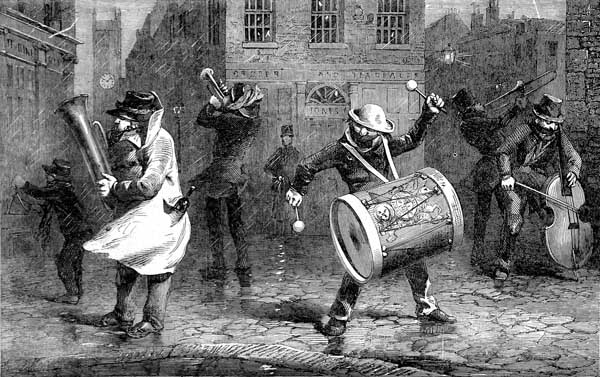
The Waits at Seven Dials (Christmas street musicians), December 1853, Illustrated London News

Ebenezer Landells engaged Hine as a contributor to Punch, the first number of which had been published on 17 July 1841. Hine's first contribution appeared in September, and he continued to work for Punch till 1844. He and William Newman were the main regular artists on the staff, before John Leech took the lead. At the end of 1844 Hine withdrew from the staff of Punch and contributed to several short-lived rival publications (Puck, The Great Gun, Joe Miller the Younger, and The Man in the Moon) and the Illustrated London News. In The Man in the Moon he created a comic strip, Mr. Crindle's Rapid Career Upon Town (1847), scripted by journalist Albert Smith. After a time he concentrated again on landscape painting.

Hine contributed small black comic sketches and cartoons to Punch. He also illustrated the first Punch's Almanac. A notable contribution was the sheet of Anti-Graham Wafers, an attack upon the home secretary, Sir James Robert Graham, who had private correspondence opened in 1844.

== Family ==
In 1840 Hine married Mary Ann Eliza, daughter of James Egerton, a coach-master. They had a family of eleven daughters and four sons. Two of his sons were Harry Hine, a member of the Institute of Painters in Water-colours, and William Egerton Hine, art master at Harrow School.

== Notes ==
Artworks by or after Henry George Hine at the Art UK site
