= Catchpenny print =

Cheap printed image from Europe or the New World, 15th–18th century

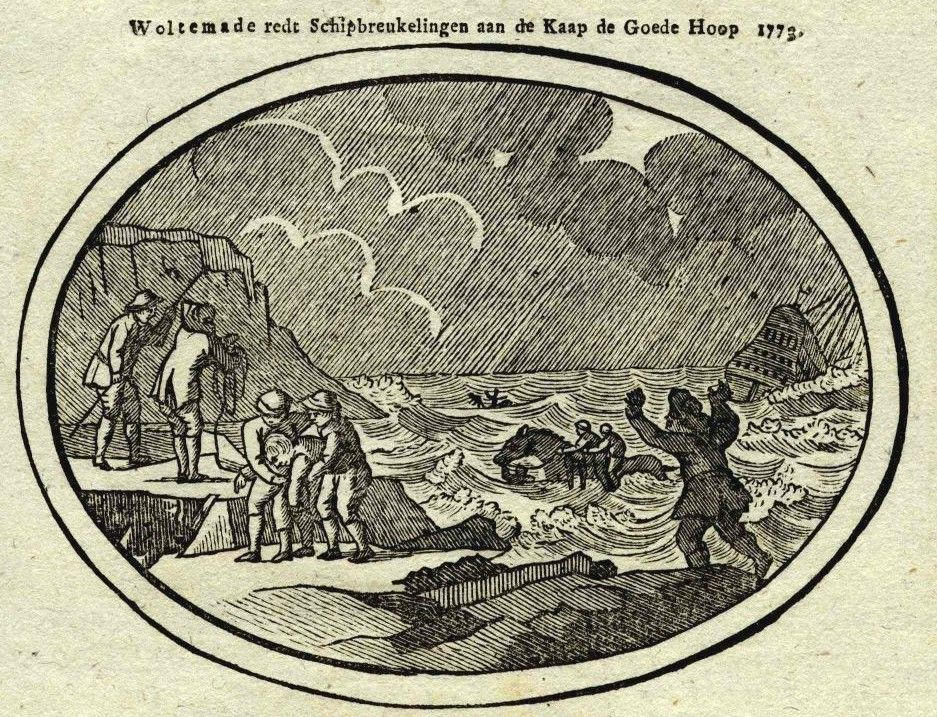
A catchpenny print depicting the rescue of Jonge Thomas's crew in Table Bay

Catchpenny print (Dutch centsprent) is the name given to a type of cheap, mass-produced sheets printed on one side and illustrated with simple images, that were sold in the Netherlands in the eighteenth and nineteenth centuries.

The catchpenny prints can be regarded as source material for research of text and language; of the daily life of our ancestors plying trades (that have disappeared), children's games, transport, fashion, role patterns, housing and housekeeping; tilling the land, poverty and wealth; of values and standards and pedagogical views and of image with illustration techniques and styles. They are also regarded as predecessors to the modern-day comic strip.

== List of centsprent artists ==
- Alexander Cranendoncq
- Jan Christoffel Jegher
- Pieter van Loon
- Dirk & Hermanus van Lubeek
- Hendrik Numan
- Jan & Gerrit Oortman
- Herman Roozen (makes modern-day versions of centsprenten)

== Image Gallery ==
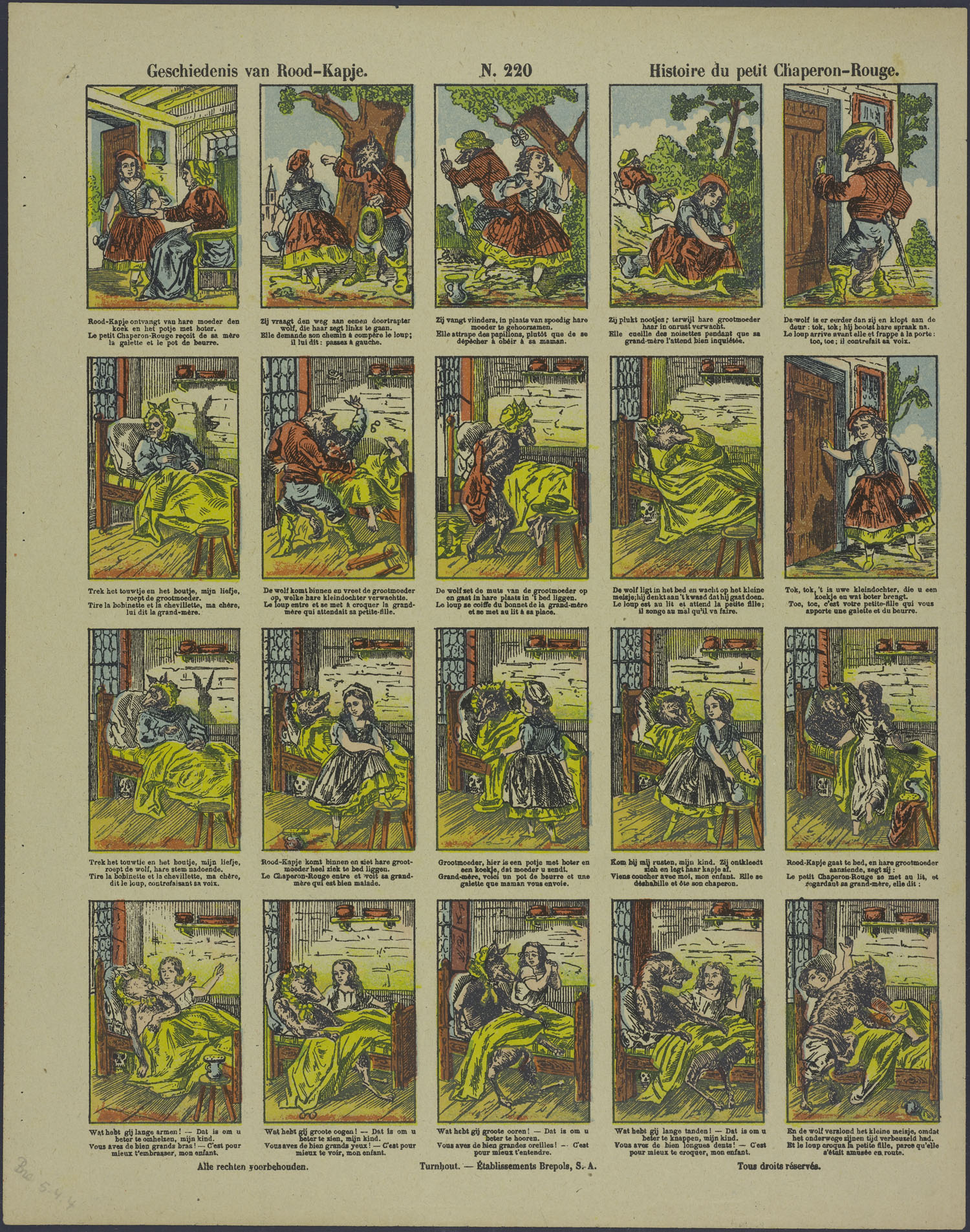
The Story of Little Red Riding Hood

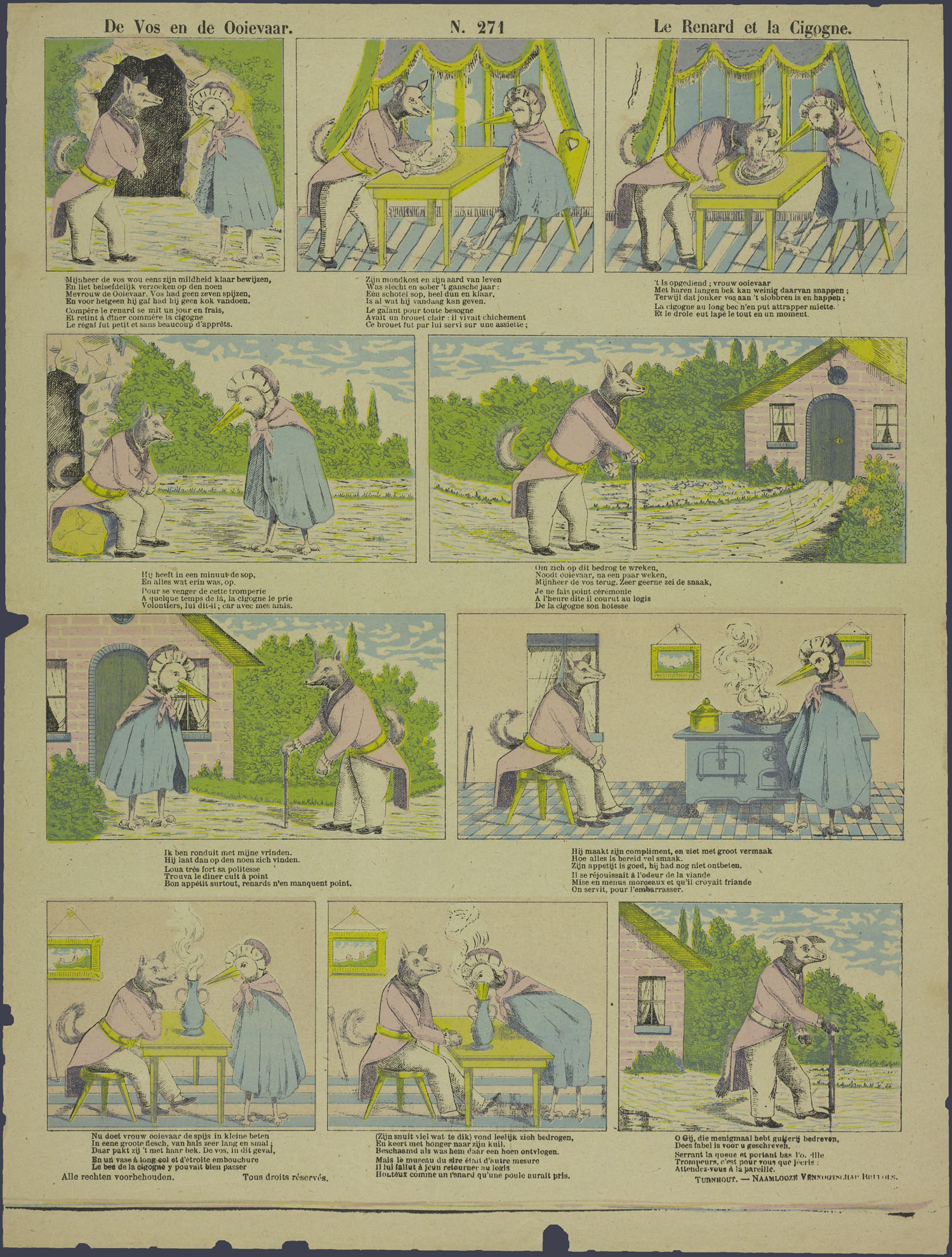
The Fox and the Stork

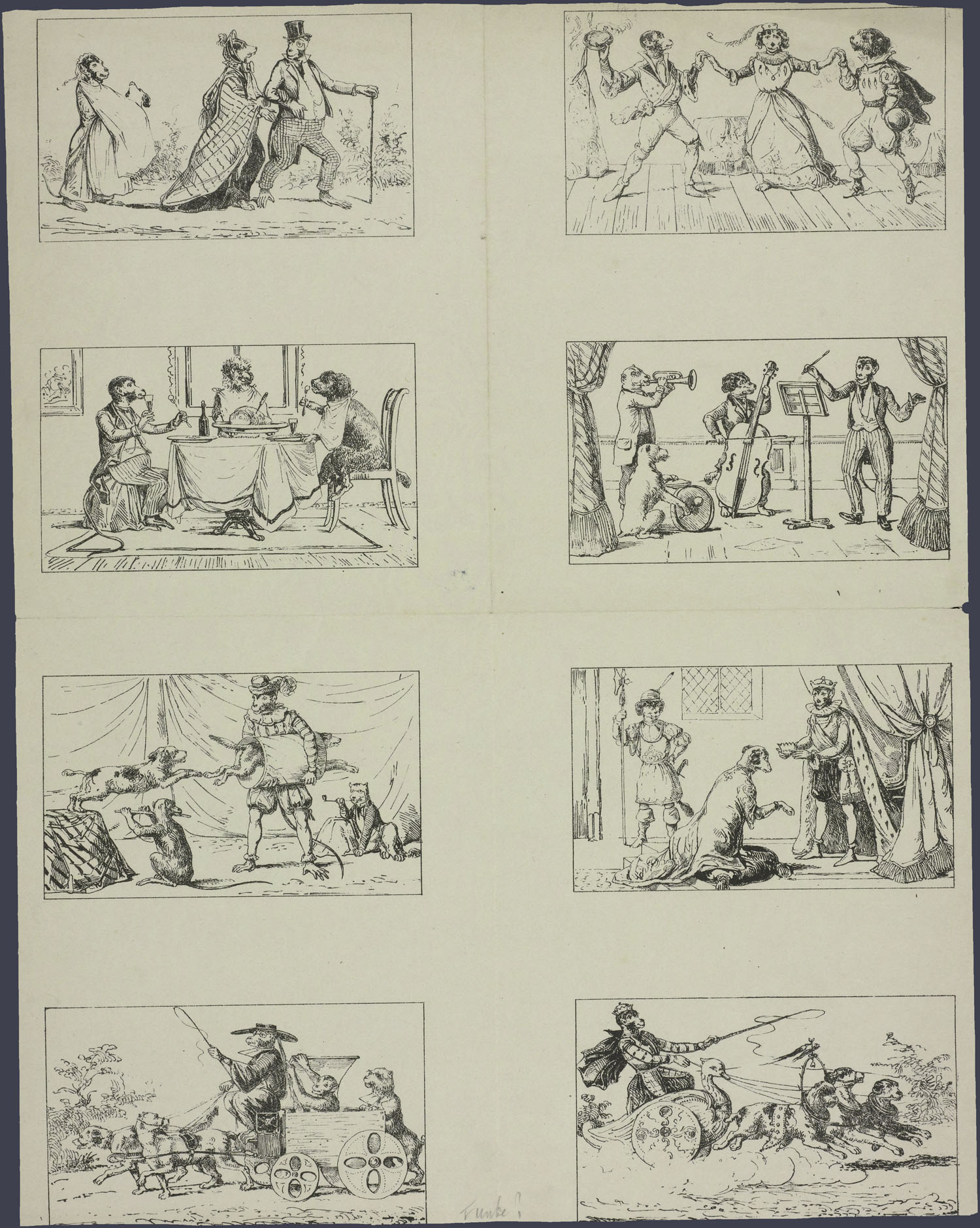
Monkeys and dogs

== See also ==
- Épinal print
