= Joseph Franz von Goez =

Austrian artist (born 1754)

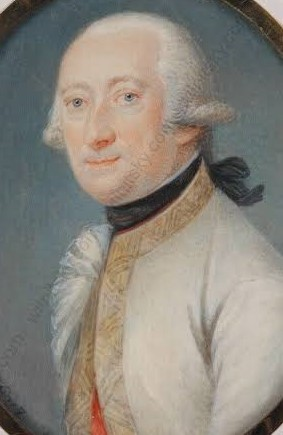
- Portrait of Goez from 1790
- Born: 28 February 1754; Sibiu, Wallachia
- Died: 16 September 1815 (aged 61); Regensburg, Electorate of Bavaria
- Occupations: Lawyer, artist, illustrator and portraitist

Joseph Franz von Goez (28 February 1754 – 16 September 1815) was an Austrian lawyer, artist, illustrator and portraitist active in Vienna in the mid-18th century. He was nicknamed "The German Hogarth" for his caricatures. Goez is credited with creating the first ever graphic novel, with his authorship of Lenardo und Blandine: Ein Melodram Nach Bürger (English: 'Lenardo and Blandine: A melodrama based on Bürger'), published in 1783. This was an illustrated storybook of a play Goez had written and produced based on a poem by Gottfried August Bürger.

== Life ==
Goez was born in Sibiu, Wallachia in 1754.

Goez began his professional career as a lawyer in Vienna. In 1779, he decided to pursue an art career. He worked as a portraitist for some time before moving to Munich, Germany. In 1783, Goez wrote and produced a play based on the dramatic ballad Lenardo und Blandine (English: 'Lenardo and Blandine') by Gottfried August Bürger. In response to the success of his dramatisation of Lenardo und Blandine, Goez developed an illustrated version of the story. This publication is now regarded as the first graphic novel.

In 1785, he published Exercises in the Imagination of different Characters and Human Forms.

Joseph Franz von Goez continued creating portraits and illustrations, living in Germany for the remainder of his life. His most renowned work is of important public figures, such as Pope Pius VI and Gustav III, King of Sweden. He moved to Regensburg in 1801, living there until his death on 16 September 1815.
