= John McLenan =

American cartoonist

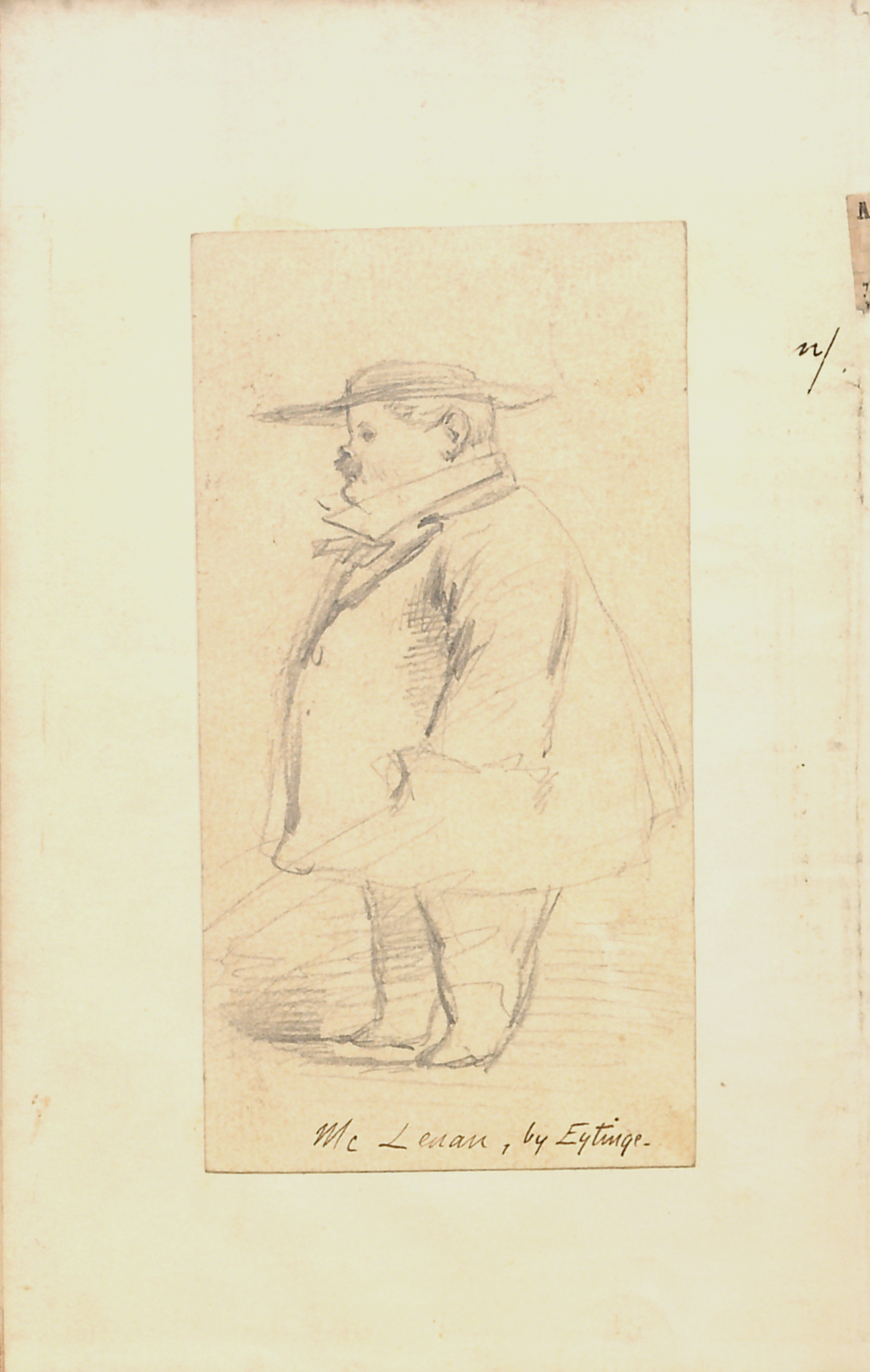
- McLenan by Sol Eytinge Jr.
- Born: 1827; United States
- Died: 1865 (aged 37–38); United States
- Known for: A Tale of Two Cities (illustrations); Great Expectations (illustrations)
- Style: Illustration, caricature

John McLenan (1827–1865) was an American illustrator and caricaturist. Active from 1852 to 1865, his works include illustrations of Charles Dickens' A Tale of Two Cities and Great Expectations for Harper's Weekly (1859 - 1861) and illustrations for two Wilkie Collins novels. Author Sinclair Hamilton wrote of McLenan

Discovered by DeWitt C. Hitchcock working in a pork-packing establishment in Cincinnati and making drawings on the tops of barrels, McLenan became one of the most prolific of our [i. e., America's] early illustrators. . . . . He was also well known as a comic draftsman. His work will bear comparison with the best of his time.

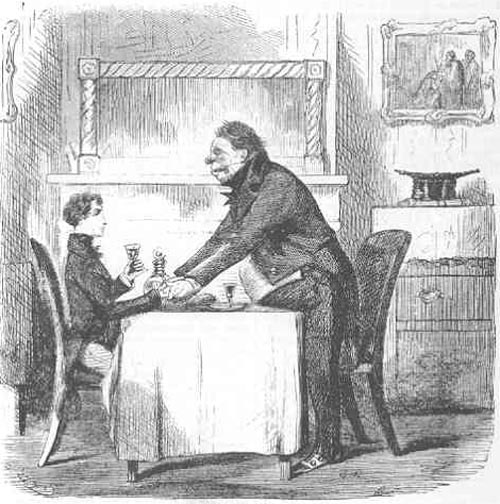
"And may I--May I--?"

Some of his cartoons make use of the text comics format, making him a pioneer in comics.
