= Carl Reinhardt =

German painter

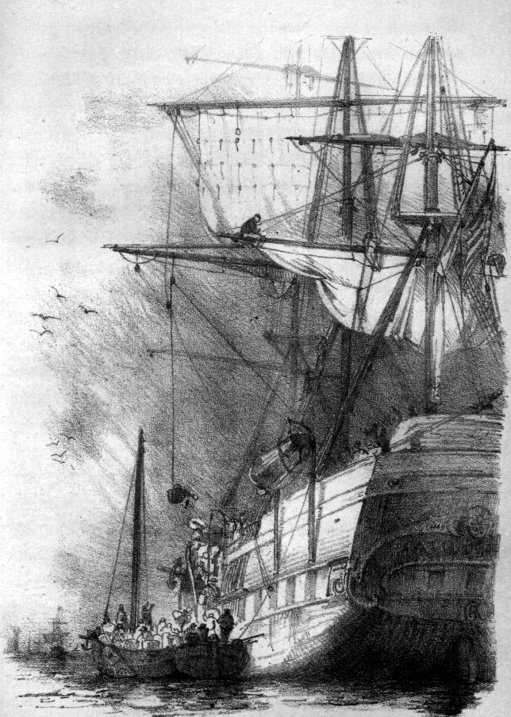
- The Ship, Illustration by Carl Reinhardt in To America! by Friedrich Gerstäcker
- Born: April 25, 1818; Leipzig, Germany
- Died: 1877; Radebeul, Germany
- Education: Johan Christian Dahl, Albert Zimmermann
- Known for: painting, drawing, writing, caricature
- Notable work: The Fifth of May, 1866-1868 From Hamburg to Heligoland, 1959; Schultze and Müller at the Paris World Fair, 1867; Talking Animals, 1854; Tin-the-hohn-se, a natural history of white slaves, 1878 various others

Carl August Reinhardt (also referred to as Karl Reinhardt; born 25. April 1818 in Leipzig, Germany; died 11. August 1877 in Radebeul, Germany) was a German writer, painter, graphic artist, and caricaturist.

== Life ==
Reinhardt studied art in Leipzig, Dresden, and Munich, under the tutelage of Johan Christian Dahl and Albert Zimmermann, among others. During the 1840s and 1850s, he lived a bohemian wandering life as a landscape painter, author, and caricaturist. During this time, he contributed to the well-known magazines Kladderadatsch, Die Gartenlaube, and Illustrirte Zeitung.

In 1848, Reinhardt contributed to the Fliegende Blätter, in an issue titled "Meister Lapp and his apprentice Pips." The original issue was incomplete, and a complete version appeared in an 1851 book version published by Braun & Schneider. Reinhardt helped pioneer the comics genre in Deutscher Bilderbogen für Jung und Alt, which was inspired by the Munich Bilderbogen.

Reinhardt made his living illustrating books. Some of his best-known lithographs appear in volumes 2-4 of To America! by Friedrich Gerstäcker, published in 1855.

By the 1860s, Reinhardt had made a name for himself, but years of hard living had taken a toll on his health. Ill and still poor, he moved to Dresden and tried his hand at being an author, playwright, and journal editor (Der Calculator an der Elbe). In 1877, he opened an eponymous tavern in Radebeul. The tavern survived Reinhardt's death, known under the abbreviated name "Zum Calculator."

== Work ==
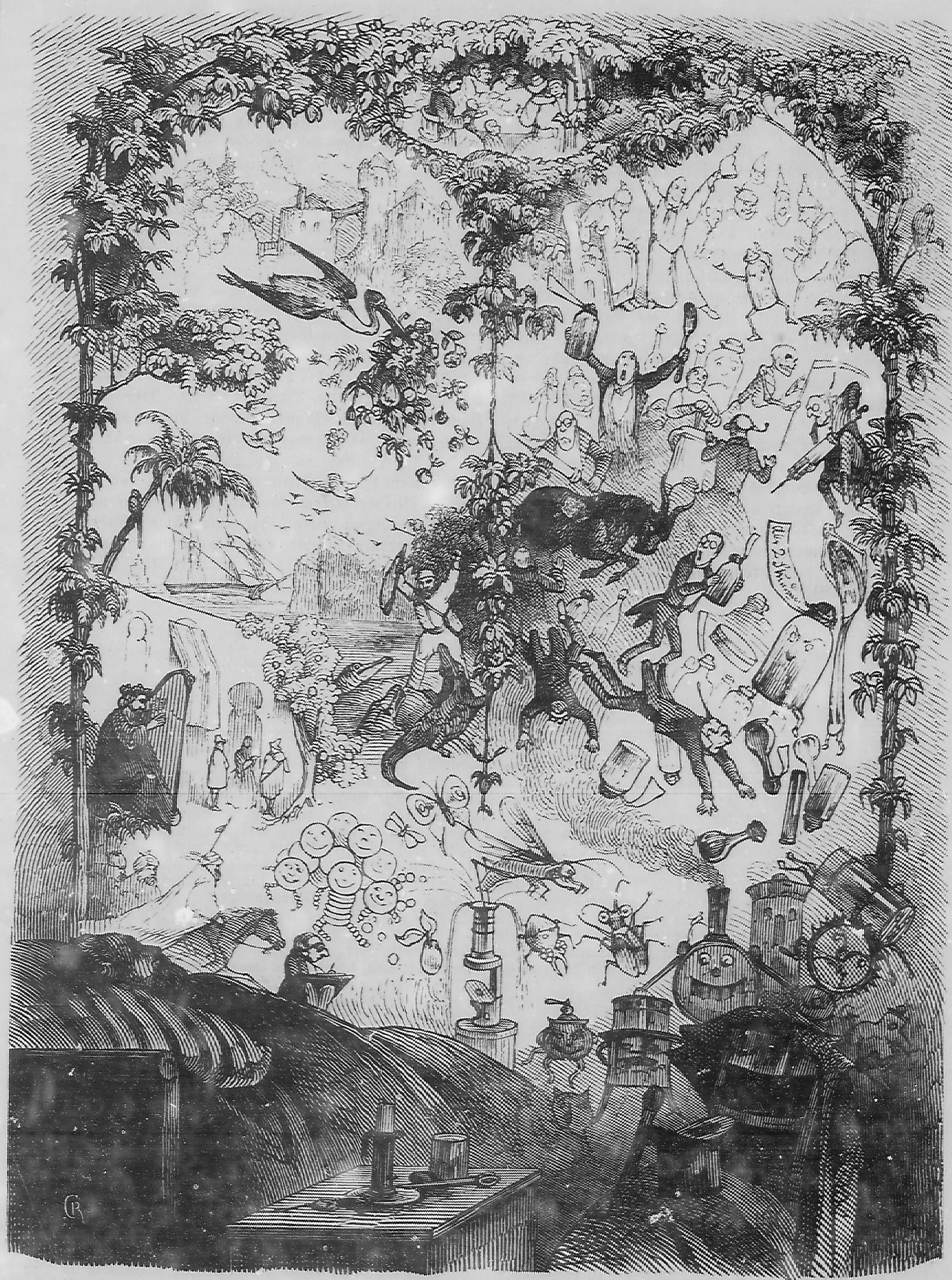
Die Gartenlaube (1853) b 573

Monographs

- Der fünfte May. Wigand, Leipzig 1866-1868.
- Von Hamburg nach Helgoland. Broschek, Hamburg 1959.
- Schultze und Müller auf der Weltausstellung in Paris. Schäfers, Leipzig 1867
- Sprechende Tiere. 1854., reprint Glassbrenner, Adolf. Carlsen, Kopenhagen 1966
- TIN-THE-HOHN-TSE. Naturgeschichte der weissen Sclaven. Bruchmann, Stuttgart 1878

Fliegende Blätter

- 172 (1848): Meister Lapp und sein Lehrjunge Pips

Deutsche Bilderbogen

- Nr. 7: Lob der edlen Musica
- Nr. 8: Grad aus dem Wirthshaus
- Nr. 39: Der Hase in der Stadt
- Nr. 52: Eine Morithat
- Nr. 96: Ein Sonntagsvergnügen
- Nr. 137: Der Bauer in der Stadt
- Nr. 156: Im schwarzen Wallfisch zu Askalon
- Nr. 165: Ein harter Vater
