= C.J. Grant =

British artist and illustrator

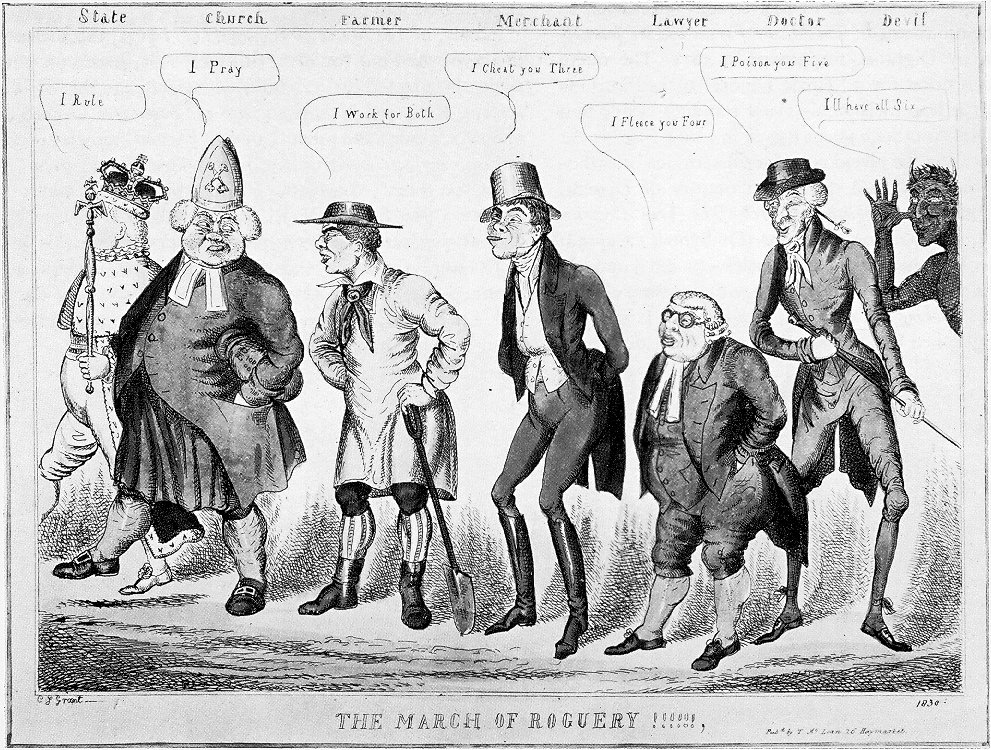
"The March of Roguery", an 1830 caricature by C. J. Grant.

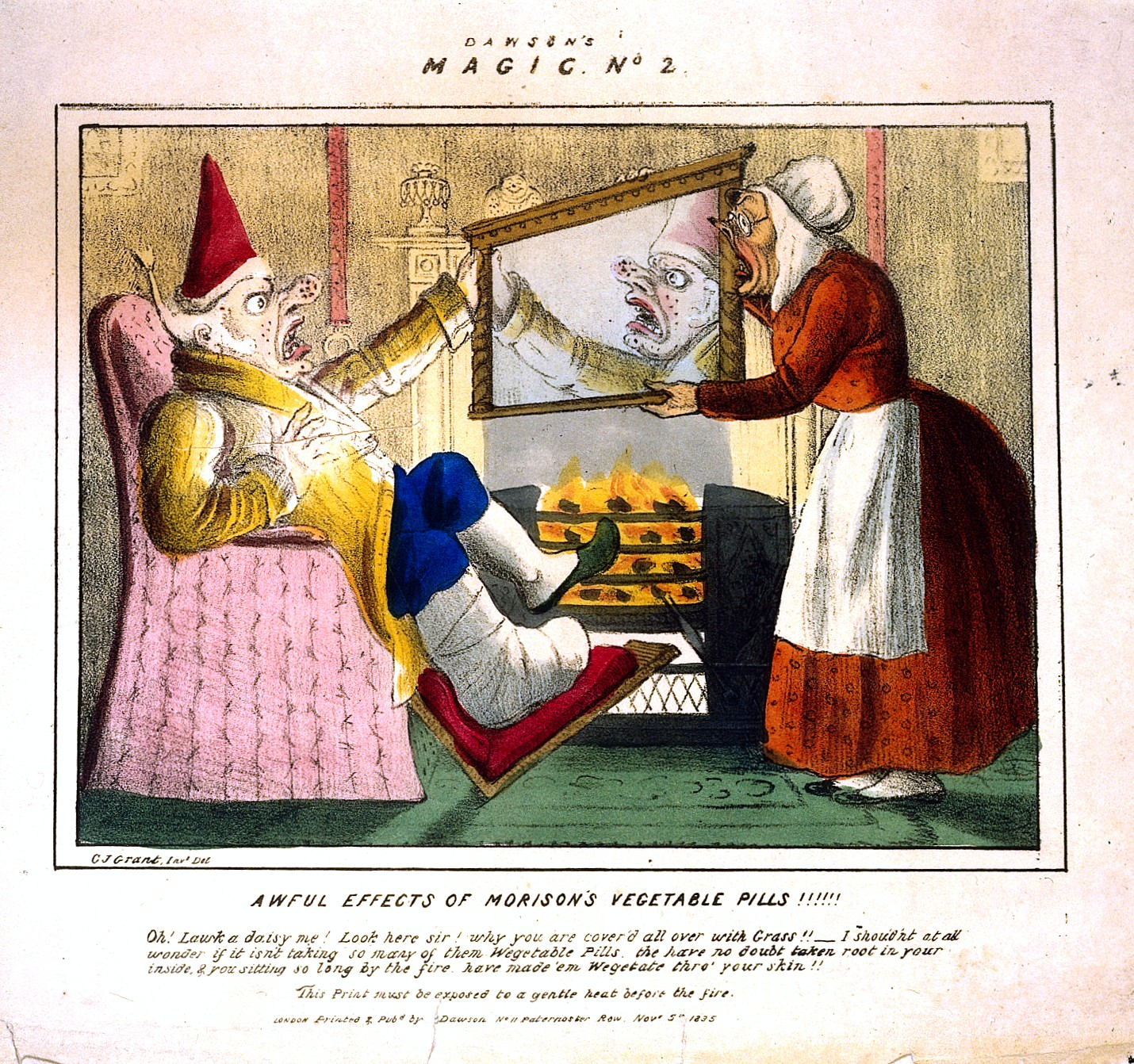
Awful effects of Morison's vegetable pills! by C.J. Grant

C.J. Grant (fl. 1830–1852), known as Charles Jameson Grant, was a British artist and illustrator, chiefly remembered for his work as an engraver of political caricatures during the mid-1830s. His most remarkable work was The Political Drama (1833–1836), a series of 131 wood-engraved political satires expressing the views of the Radical movement and attacking the conduct of the Whig and Tory factions for failing to introduce more democratic constitutional reforms. He would go on to produce woodcuts for several Chartist newspaper titles during the late-1830s and early-1840s but his career appears to have entered a period of decline thereafter. His last known print was published in 1852 and it is possible that he died shortly thereafter. He typically signed his prints "C.J. Grant" or "C.J.G."

== Biography ==
Little is known about C.J. Grant's life and even his full name remains something of a mystery. Although commonly referred to as Charles Jameson Grant today, this interpretation of his initials comes from a source published some twenty years after his career came to an end and it is not corroborated by any evidence from Grant's own lifetime. As there are no records of anyone named Charles Jameson Grant living in or around London during the first half of the nineteenth century, it is possible that the middle name 'Jameson' was adopted in place of a more conventional set of forenames such as 'Charles James' or 'Charles John'.

A Charles James Grant was baptised at the church of St George the Martyr in Southwark on 3 July 1803. The approximate date of birth and baby's mother's name correlate with C.J. Grant's entry in the 1841 census, which lists him as a 37 year-old engraver living with a 66 year-old woman named Sarah Grant. If Grant spent his formative years in south London then this perhaps explains how he managed to establish an early connection with the Lambeth-based caricaturist William Heath. The discovery of Grant's personal guard book of prints in the 1990s revealed that he produced a number of caricatures for Heath which the latter then published and passed off as his own work. The exact nature of the relationship between the two artists is difficult to determine but it seems likely that it came to an end by the spring of 1831, as by that time Grant had begun openly pirating copies of Heath's work for other publishers.

Grant also pursued a parallel career as a writer of pantomimes and popular theatre. In 1830 he fell into a public dispute with the noted stage entertainer and clown Signor Paulo after publishing a letter in The Morning Advertiser newspaper in which he accused Signor Paulo of plagiarising one of his scripts. Signor Paulo strenuously denied the accusation and wrote back to say that he had only agreed to read Grant's script out of respect for a mutual friend and that he found it "totally destitute of the indispensable requisites of entertainments of that description." A theatrical connection would explain the many dramatic reference which appear in Grant's prints, including most notably The Political Drama, which includes numerous references to plays that were being performed on the London stage at the time of their publication.

Further evidence that Grant possessed a disputatious temper can be found in the following notice which appeared in the caricature The Political Drama No. 110: "C.J.G. takes this opportunity of informing the inhabitants of Paris, and its vicinity, that he has no connexion [sic] in his capacity as artist, with one Gabriel Shire Tregear, publisher, of London, for some time past, and solemnly prays he may never again." Tregear had been one of Grant's principle publishers during the early part of his career but by 1835 the relationship had clearly come to an acrimonious end for reasons that remain unknown.

By 1840 Grant's fortunes were waning and in a letter written in that year he is said to have plaintively referred to himself as "an obscure object in the background" of London's publishing trade. The London census returns record him living in shared accommodation with an older woman who was likely to have been his mother in a small courtyard located just off Gray's Inn Road in the year 1841. He may also have been the Charles John Grant who is listed as a 'lithographic printer' working on nearby St Chad's Row in a London trade directory of 1839, but if that was the case then venture was evidently short-lived as the address was occupied by a new owner less than four years later.

Grant's last known print was published in 1852. The records for the New Burial Ground Bermondsey indicate that a Charles James Grant was interred there in 1854 and it's therefore possible that the caricaturist died within a few years of his final publication. This would be consistent with the speculative claim made by one historian who wrote that the drying up of his career meant that Grant was likely to have come "to a miserable and poverty-stricken end in Dickens's London."
