= Pieter Gillis =

Peter Giles
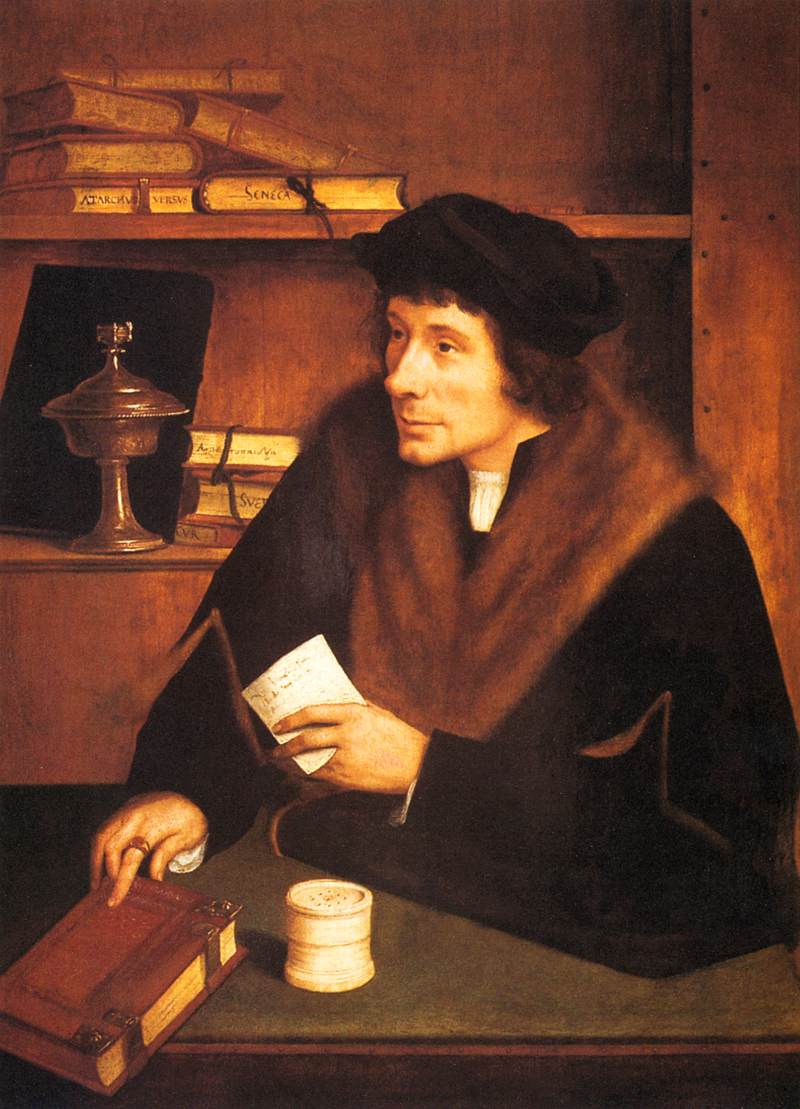
- Born: 28 July 1486; Antwerp
- Died: 6 or 11 November 1533 (aged 47); Antwerp
- Other names: Petrus Ægidius, Peter Giles, Peter Gilles, Pierre Gilles
- Occupation: magistrate of Antwerp
- Known for: friendship with Sir Thomas More and Erasmus
- Spouse(s): Cornelia Sandrien, Maria Denis Adriaensdochter, Kathelijne Draeckx

Pieter Gillis (28 July 1486 – 6 or 11 November 1533), known by his anglicised name Peter Giles, the gallicized Pierre Gilles and sometimes the Latinised Petrus Ægidius, was a humanist, printer, and secretary to the city of Antwerp in the early sixteenth century. He is most famous as a friend and supporter of Desiderius Erasmus and Thomas More. He seemed to have recommended the painter Hans Holbein the Younger to the court of England, where Thomas More received him delighted.

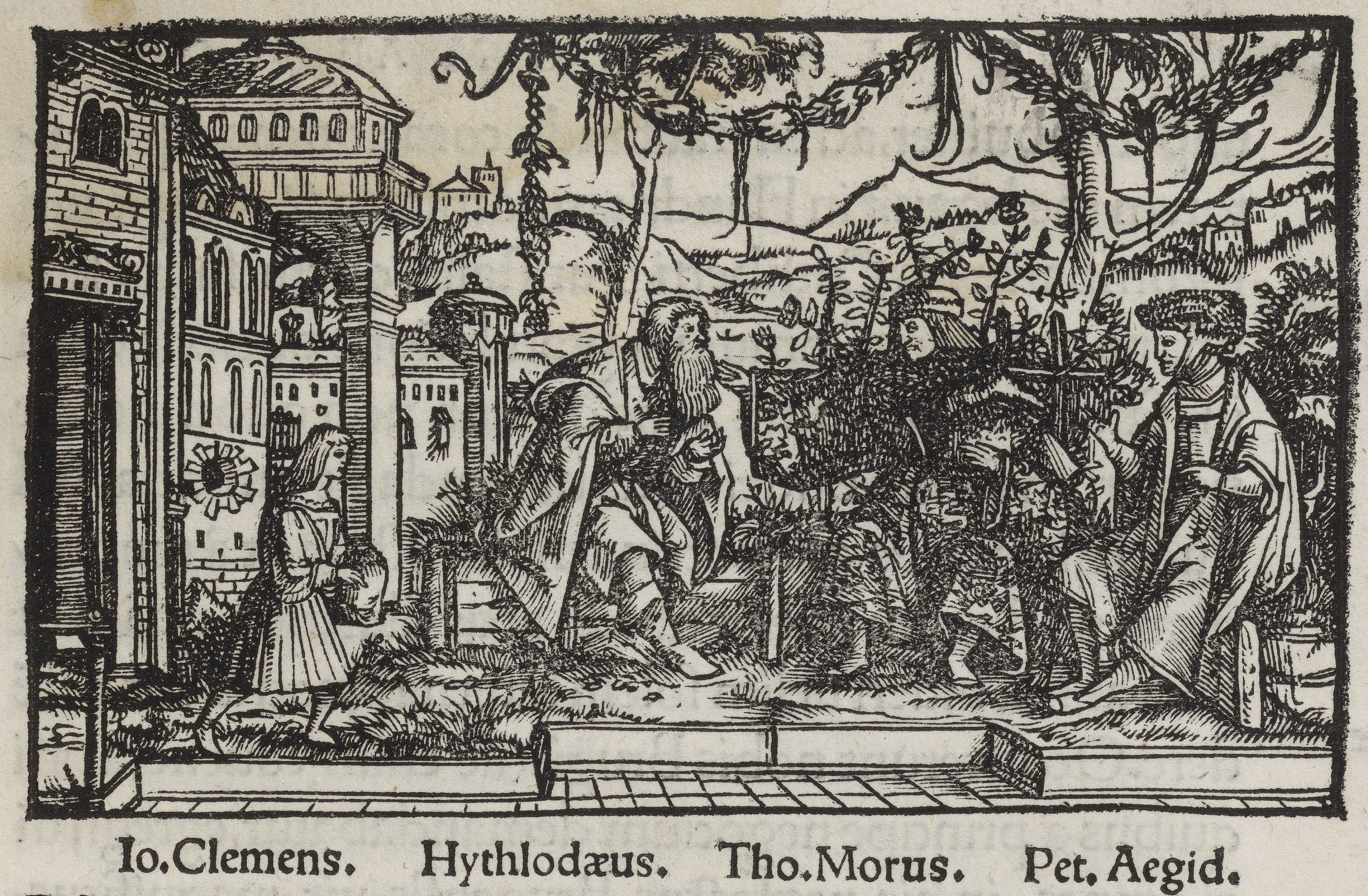
Pieter Gillis as Pet. Aegid. talks with Thomas More, Raphael Hythlodæus and another character in an illustration by Ambrosius Holbein for Utopia.

Thomas More's Utopia, although fictional, includes Pieter Gillis as a character in Book I. More dedicated Utopia to Gillis, who may have designed the Utopian alphabet. They first met when diplomatic business brought More and Cuthbert Tunstall to Antwerp.
