= Hans Holbein =

Hans Holbein may refer to:

- Hans Holbein the Elder (c. 1460–1524), German painter
- Hans Holbein the Younger (c. 1497–1543), German-Swiss artist and printmaker, considerably more famous than his father
