= Grey Passion =

Painting series by Hans Holbein the Elder

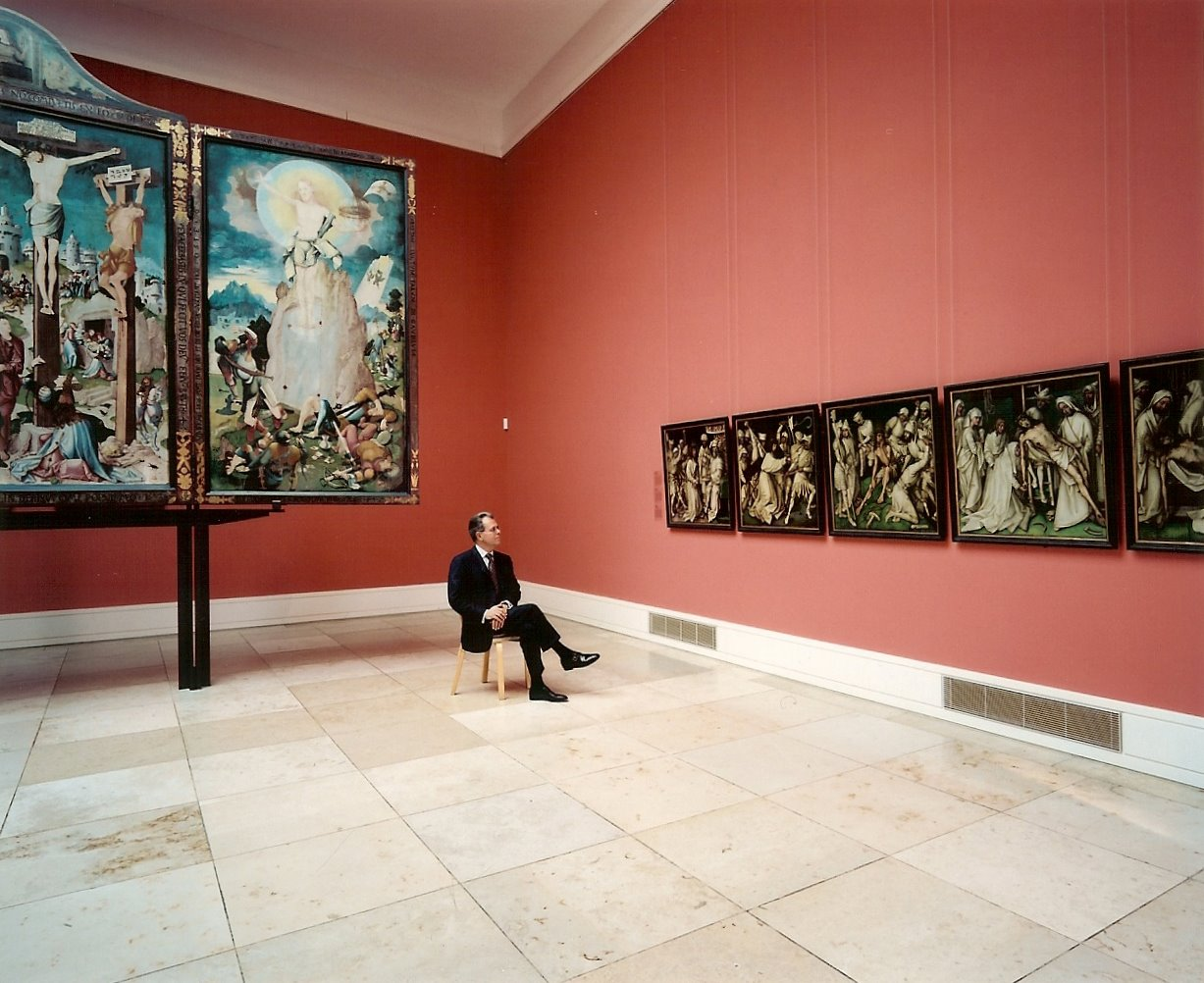

The Grey Passion is a series of paintings by Hans Holbein the Elder (1465–1524). Executed between 1494 and 1500, it comprises twelve panels illustrating the Passion of Christ; Holbein's monochrome palette is almost entirely grey. The paintings were purchased by the Staatsgalerie Stuttgart, the Stuttgart State Art Gallery in Germany. The State Art Gallery acquired the altarpiece in 2003 for 12 million euros. The restoration of the artworks lasted three years and cost 450 thousand euros.

== Painting ==
The series is considered one of the most important of Holbein's works. The Grey Passion was part of an altar painting, a triptych; its centerpiece was a sculpture by Gregor Erhart (c. 1470 – 1540), now lost, and the wings each contained the six paintings.

The Grey Passion was painted during Holbein's so-called Augsburg period, when he lived in Augsburg. In theme and treatment it is inspired by works of artists such as Dirk Bouts, the Master of Frankfurt, and Martin Schongauer. The aspect of this work that was different, and which is entirely specific to this work, is the grisaille painting style in which almost all colours were omitted except for shades of grey. Some reds and greens are used, while the underlying sketches were made with a silver pencil. The palette used by Holbein in the Grey Passion is unparalleled throughout European altar painting - the monochrome grey perhaps symbolises a theme detached from this world. Hans Holbein the Elder followed the example of Jan van Eyck and Hans Memling and their circle, who had experimented with painting in grisaille.

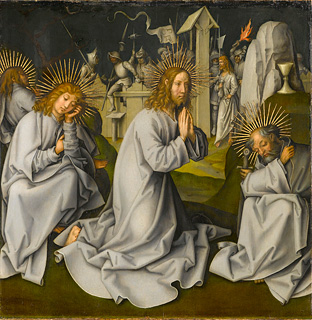
Christ on the Mount of Olives

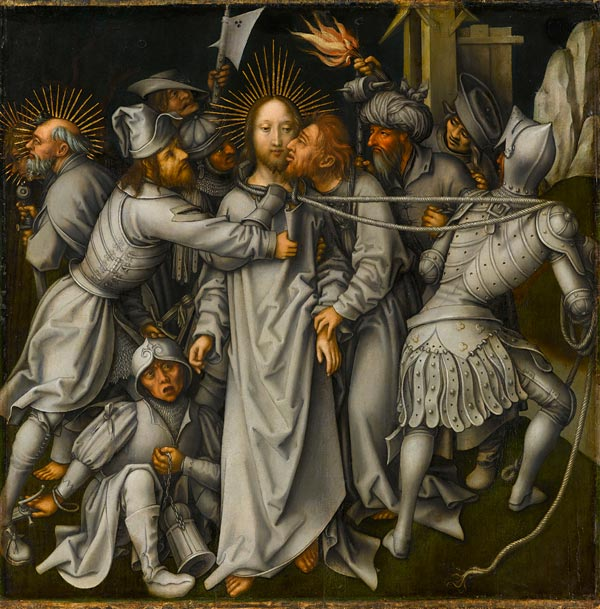
The kiss of Judas

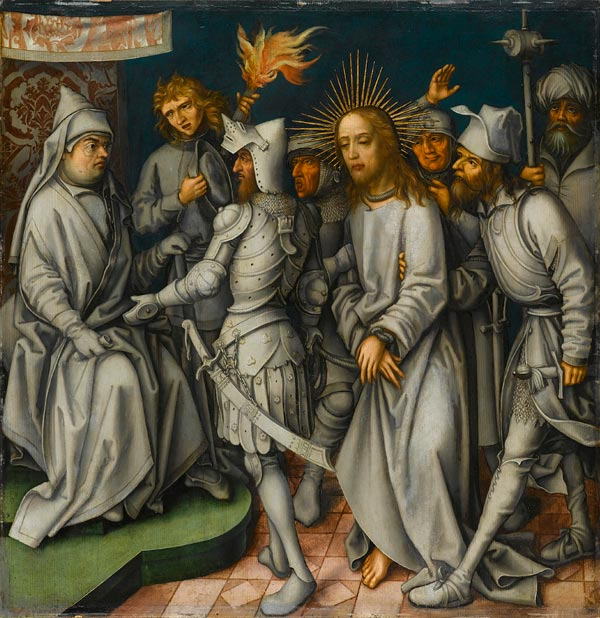
In front of the High Priest

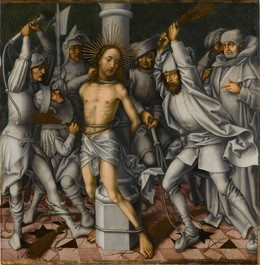
Flagellation of Christ

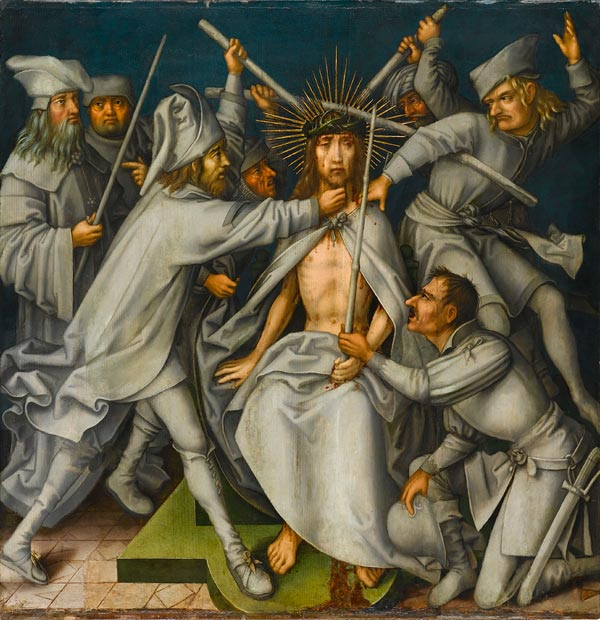
The crown of thorns

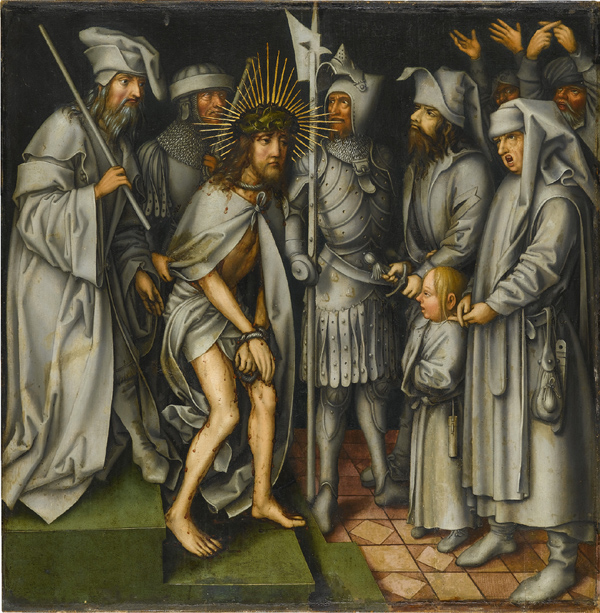
Ecce Homo

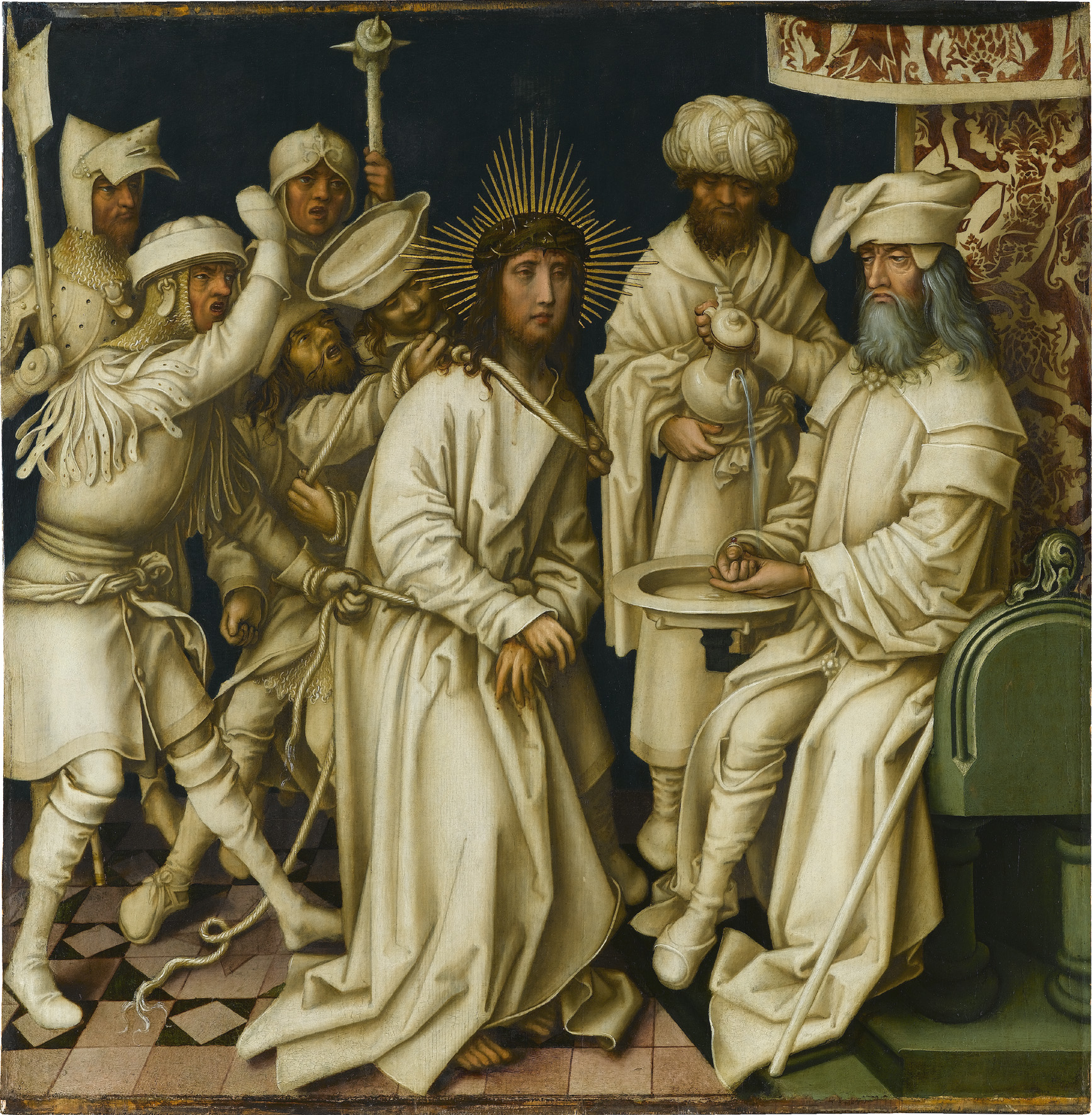
Pontius Pilate washing his hands

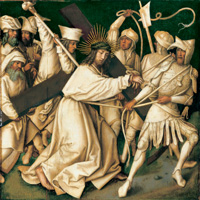
Carrying the cross

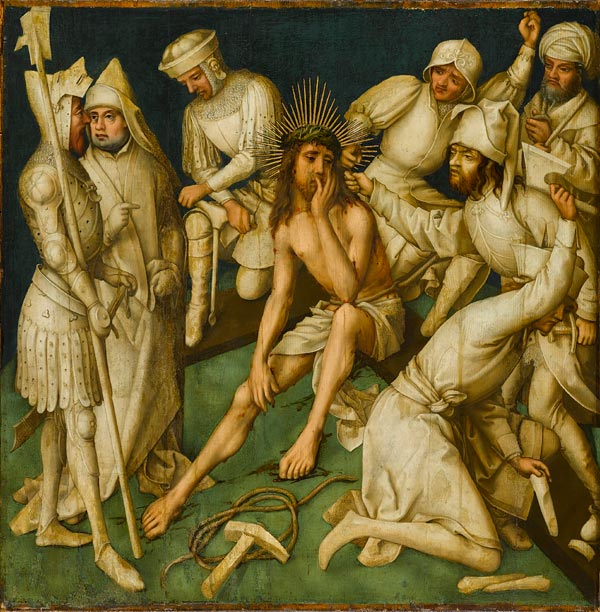
Christ in silence

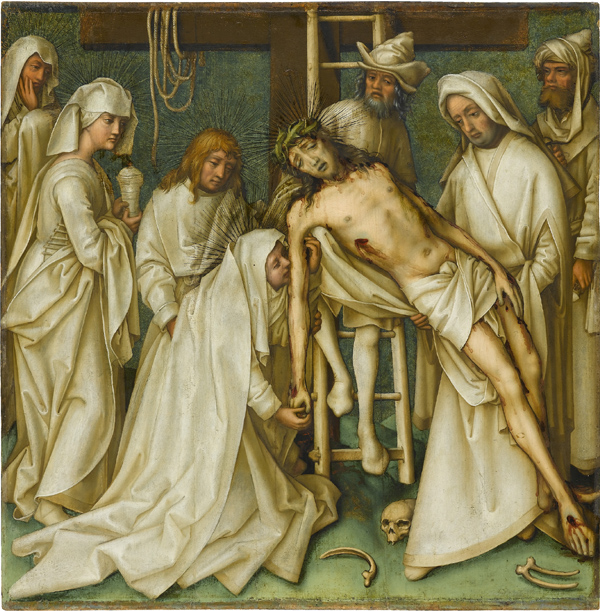
Descent from the Cross

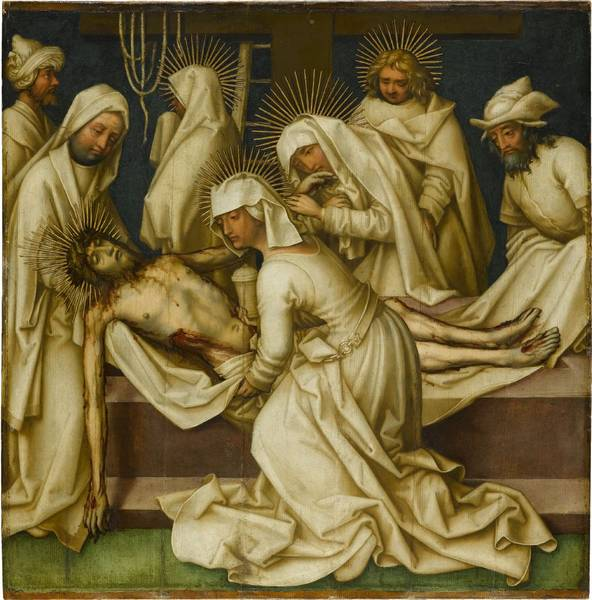
Lamentation of Christ

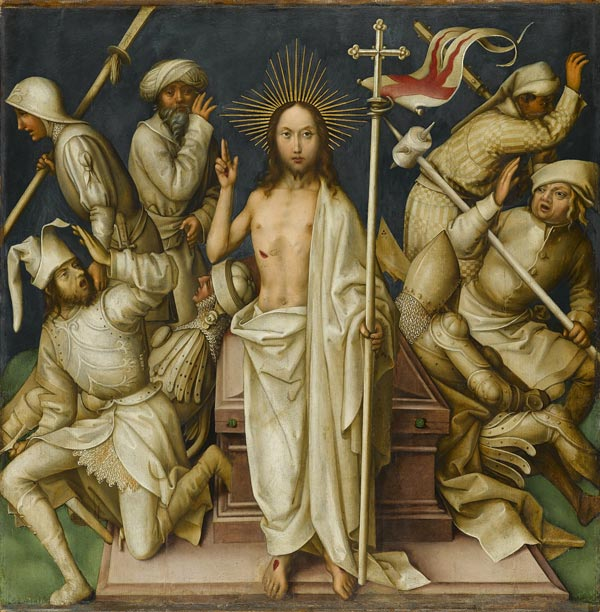
Resurrection

== External video ==
External videos
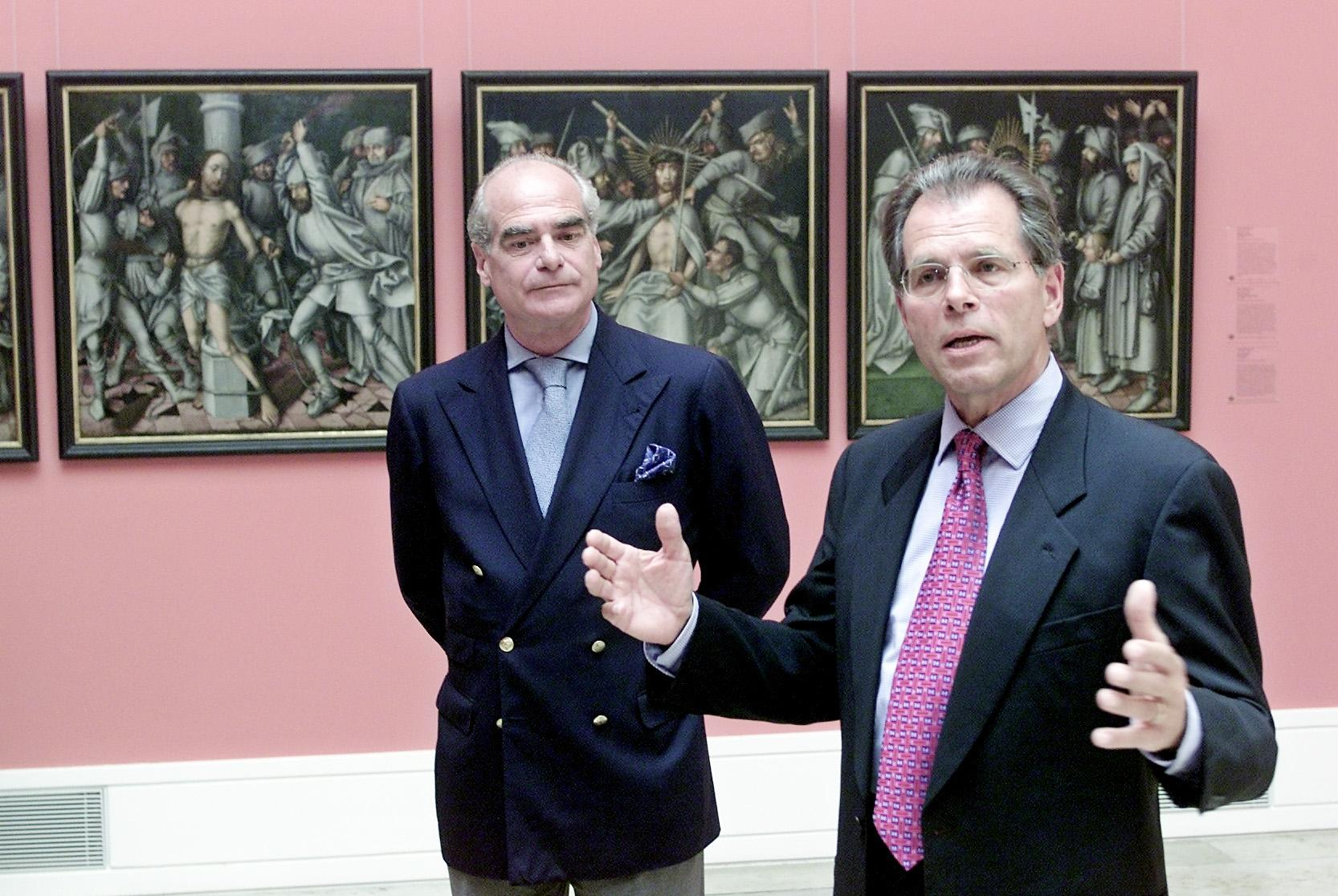
- Video Hans Holbein the Elder's The Grey Passion

- See an external video about Grey Passion
