= Utopian language =

Fictional language in Thomas More's book

Utopian
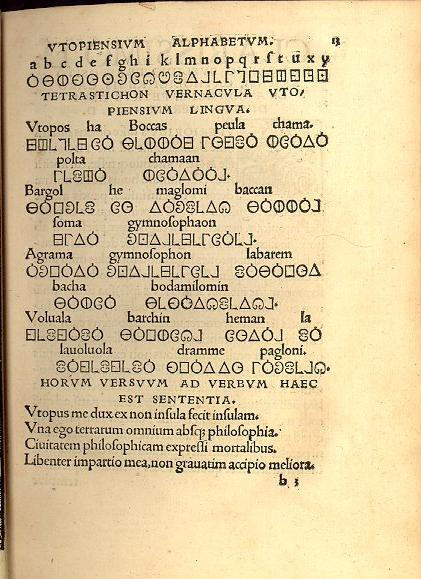
- The Utopian quatrain and its Latin translation in the 1518 edition of Utopia
- Created by: Thomas More, Pieter Gillis
- Date: 1516
- Setting and usage: Utopia (book)
- Purpose: Constructed language: Utopian
- Writing system: Utopian alphabet
- Sources: Influenced by Greek, Latin, and Hebrew

Official status
- Official language in: Utopia

Language codes
- ISO 639-3: qto (unofficial)
- Glottolog: None
- IETF: art-x-utopian (unofficial)

The Utopian language is the language of the fictional land of Utopia, as described in Thomas More's Utopia. A brief sample of the constructed language is found in an addendum to More's book, written by his friend Peter Giles. Pretending to be factual, the book does not name the creator of the language; both More and Giles have been alternately credited, with Giles often thought to have designed the alphabet.

== Grammar ==
Although some words in Utopian show different forms corresponding to different cases in the Latin translation, there is no evidence of a consistent relationship between form and meaning, as can be seen from the following comparison of the nominal, pronominal, and adjectival case forms:

	Singular	Plural
Nominative	Vtopos, Boccas, bargol, he Ūtopus, dux, ūna, ego	
Accusative	hā, chamāan, āgrama, gymnosophon mē, insulam, civitātem, philosophicam	heman, paglōni mea, meliōra
Ablative	chama, gymnosophāon insulā, philosophiā	
Dative		bōdamilōmin mortālibus
Genitive		māglōmi, baccan terrārum, omnium

There are only four verbs in the Utopian poem, and these also show no evidence of a correspondence between form and function:

	1st person	3rd person
Present	barchin, dramme impartiō, accipiō	
Perfect	labarembacha expressī	polta fēcit

== Writing system ==
Utopian has its own 22-letter alphabet, with letters based on the shapes of the circle, square, and triangle. These correspond almost exactly to the 23-letter Roman alphabet used in the 16th century, lacking only z. The letters f, k, q, and x, though assigned Utopian equivalents, do not occur in the given text. There are several errors in the text (for example, the first word is given as utopos in Latin script, but as similar-looking stoqos in Utopian script).

== Examples ==
The only extant text in Utopian is a quatrain written by Peter Giles in an addendum to Utopia:

Vtopos ha Boccas peu la chama polta chamaan.
Bargol he maglomi baccan ſoma gymno ſophaon.
Agrama gymnoſophon labarembacha bodamilomin.
Voluala barchin heman la lauoluola dramme pagloni.

It is translated literally into Latin as:

Vtopus me dux ex non insula fecit insulam.
Vna ego terrarum omnium absque philosophia
Ciuitatem philosophicam expressi mortalibus
Libenter impartio mea, non grauatim accipio meliora.

This, in turn, is translated into English as follows:

The commander Utopus made me into an island out of a non-island.
I alone of all nations, without philosophy,
have portrayed for mortals the philosophical city.
Freely I impart my benefits; not unwillingly I accept whatever is better.

Armed with these translations, it is possible to deduce the following vocabulary:

Vocabulary of the Utopian Language
Utopian	Latin	English
agrama	ciuitatem	city (accusative; cf. Sanskrit grāmam, village)
baccan	omnium	of all
barchin	impartio	I impart
bargol	una	one, the only
boccas	dux	commander
bodamilomin	mortalibus	for the mortals
chama	insulā	from (the/an) island (ablative)
chamaan	insulam	island (accusative)
dramme	accipio	I receive
gymnosophaon	philosophiā	from philosophy (ablative)
gymnosophon	philosophicam	philosophical (accusative)
ha	me	me
he	ego	I
heman	mea	(those which are) mine
la	non	not
larembacha	expressi	I have represented (perfect)
lauoluola	grauatim	unwillingly (la + voluala)
maglomi	terrarum	of the lands
pagloni	meliora	those which are better; better things
peu	ex	from, out of
polta	fecit	(he) has made (perfect)
soma	absque	without
uoluala	libenter	freely, willingly
Vtopos	Vtopus	Utopus (mythical founder of Utopia)

In accordance with 16th-century typographical custom, the letters V and u are a casing pair, not distinct letters: V was the capital form and u the lower case. V~u represented a consonant or vowel depending on position, similar to y in modern English (e.g. nymph vs yellow). Analysis of the metre of the verse shows that the reader was expected to read Vtopos as 'Utopos', uoluala as 'volvala' and lauoluola as 'lavolvola'.

More's text also contains Utopian "native" terms for Utopian concepts.
