= Portrait of a Woman (Hans Holbein the Elder) =

Painting by Hans Holbein the Elder

- French: Portrait de Femme, German: Bildnis einer Frau
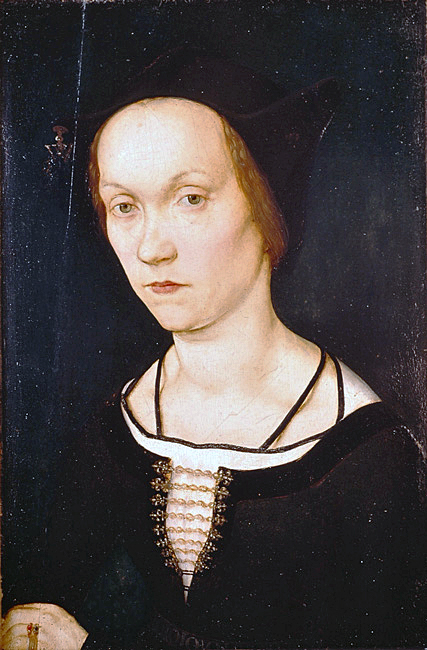
- Artist: Hans Holbein the Elder
- Year: c. 1515
- Medium: oil paint on panel
- Movement: Northern Renaissance; Portrait painting
- Subject: a middle-aged woman
- Dimensions: 31 cm × 21 cm (12 in × 8.3 in)
- Location: Unterlinden Museum, Colmar
- Accession: 1980

Portrait of a Woman is a c. 1515 oil painting by the German artist Hans Holbein the Elder. It is now in the Unterlinden Museum in Colmar, France. Its inventory number is 80.1.1. In the 19th century, the painting used to belong to count Karol Lanckoroński, of Vienna. In 2016, it was the only painting by Holbein the Elder owned by a public collection in France.

This portrait was painted towards the end of the artist's life. The depicted woman's identity is unknown.
