= Ralph Robinson (humanist) =

English scholar (1520–1577)

Ralph Robinson (1520–1577) was an English scholar and man of letters. He is best known for his English translation of Sir Thomas More's Utopia, originally written in Latin in 1516.

== Life ==
Robinson was educated at Stamford School, Lincolnshire and Corpus Christi College, Oxford. At school he was a contemporary of William Cecil later Lord Burghley, Lord High Treasurer of England and chief adviser to Queen Elizabeth I, and the foreword of his translation, which is dedicated to Burghley, alludes to their school-days together.

He graduated B.A. in 1540, and was elected fellow of his college Corpus on 16 June 1542. In March 1544 he supplicated for the degree of M.A. Coming to London, he obtained the livery of the Goldsmiths' Company, and a small post as clerk in the service of his early friend, Cecil. From a poor background, he was long hampered by the poverty of the rest of his family.

== Utopia translation ==
Robinson's translation Utopia was originally published in 1551, with a second, revised, edition published in 1556. The book was published by Abraham Veal, at the sign of the Lamb in St. Paul's Churchyard, in 1551. The second edition appeared without the dedicatory letter. The third edition is dated 1597, and the 'newly corrected' fourth of 1624 is dedicated by the publisher, Bernard Alsop, to Cresacre More. Subsequent translators were Gilbert Burnet (1684) and Arthur Cayley (1808).

From the section Of Lawes Not Made According to Equitie:

But let us consider those thinges that chaunce daily before our eyes. First there is a great number of gentelmen, which can not be content to live idle themselves, lyke dorres, of that whiche other have laboured for: their tenauntes I meane, whom they polle and shave to the quicke, by reisyng their rentes (for this only poynte of frugalitie do they use, men els through their lavasse and prodigall spendynge, hable to brynge theymselfes to verye beggerye) these gentlemen, I say, do not only live in idlenesse themselves, but also carrye about with them at their tailes a great flocke or traine of idle and loyterynge servyngmen, which never learned any craft wherby to gette their livynges. These men as sone as their mayster is dead, or be sicke themselfes, be incontinent thrust out of dores. For gentlemen hadde rather keepe idle persones, then sicke men, and many times the dead mans heyre is not hable to mainteine so great a house, and kepe so many serving men as his father dyd. Then in the meane season they that be thus destitute of service, either starve for honger, or manfullye playe the theves. For what would you have them to do? When they have wandred abrode so longe, untyl they have worne thredebare their apparell, and also appaired their helth, then gentlemen because of their pale and sickely faces, and patched cotes, will not take them into service. And husbandmen dare not set them a worke, knowynge wel ynough that he is nothing mete to do trewe and faythful service to a poore man wyth a spade and a mattoke for small wages and hard fare, whyche beynge deyntely and tenderly pampered up in ydilnes and pleasure, was wont with a sworde and a buckler by hys syde to jette through the strete with a bragginge loke, and to thynke hym selfe to good to be anye mans mate.
