= Utopia (book) =

1516 book by Thomas More

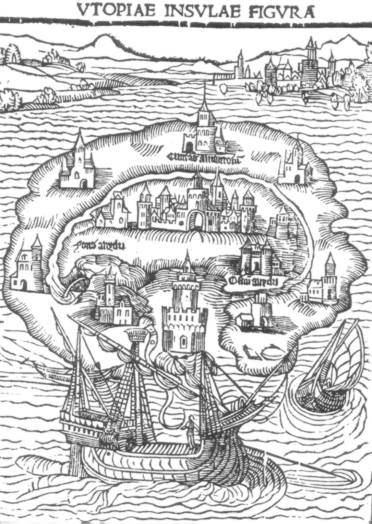
- Illustration for the 1516 first edition of Utopia
- Author: Thomas More
- Original title: Libellus vere aureus, nec minus salutaris quam festivus, de optimo rei publicae statu deque nova insula Utopia
- Translators: Ralph Robinson; Gilbert Burnet
- Illustrator: Ambrosius Holbein
- Language: Latin
- Genre: Political philosophy, satire
- Publisher: More
- Publication date: 1516
- Publication place: Habsburg Netherlands
- English publication date: 1551
- Media type: Print
- Pages: 359
- OCLC: 863744174
- Dewey Decimal: 335.02
- LC Class: HX810.5 .E54
- Preceded by: A Merry Jest
- Followed by: Latin Poems
- Original text: Libellus vere aureus, nec minus salutaris quam festivus, de optimo rei publicae statu deque nova insula Utopia at Latin Wikisource
- Translation: Utopia at Wikisource

Utopia (Latin: Libellus vere aureus, nec minus salutaris quam festivus, de optimo rei publicae statu deque nova insula Utopia, "A truly golden little book, not less beneficial than enjoyable, about how things should be in a state and about the new island Utopia") is a work of fiction and socio-political satire by Thomas More (1478–1535), written in Latin and published in 1516 and revised in 1518. The book is a frame narrative primarily depicting a fictional island society and its religious, social and political customs. Many aspects of More's description of Utopia are reminiscent of life in monasteries.

== Title ==
The title De optimo rei publicae statu deque nova insula Utopia literally translates to "Of a republic's best state and of the new island Utopia."

It is variously rendered as any of the following:

- On the Best State of a Republic and on the New Island of Utopia
- Concerning the Highest State of the Republic and the New Island Utopia
- On the Best State of a Commonwealth and on the New Island of Utopia
- Concerning the Best Condition of the Commonwealth and the New Island of Utopia
- On the Best Kind of a Republic and About the New Island of Utopia
- About the Best State of a Commonwealth and the New Island of Utopia

The first created original name was even longer: Libellus vere aureus, nec minus salutaris quam festivus, de optimo rei publicae statu deque nova insula Utopia. This translates to, "A truly golden little book, no less beneficial than entertaining, of a republic's best state and of the new island Utopia."

Utopia is derived from the Greek prefix "ou-" (οὔ), meaning "not", and topos (τόπος), "place," with the suffix -iā (-ίᾱ) that is typical of toponyms; the name literally means "nowhere", emphasizing its fictionality. In early modern English, Utopia was spelled "Utopie", which is today rendered Utopy in some editions.

In fact, More's very first name for the island was Nusquama, the Latin equivalent of "no-place", but he eventually opted for the Greek-influenced name.

In English, Utopia is pronounced the same as Eutopia (the latter word, in Greek Εὐτοπία [Eutopiā], meaning "good place," contains the prefix εὐ- [eu-], "good", with which the οὔ of Utopia has come to be confused in the English pronunciation). That is something that More himself addresses in an addendum to his book: Wherfore not Utopie, but rather rightely my name is Eutopie, a place of felicitie. (Note: Felicitie means "happiness".)

== Contents ==
=== Preliminary matter ===
The first edition contained a woodcut map of the island of Utopia, the Utopian alphabet, verses by Pieter Gillis, Gerard Geldenhouwer, and Cornelius Grapheus, and Thomas More's epistle dedicating the work to Gillis.

=== Book 1: Dialogue of Counsel ===
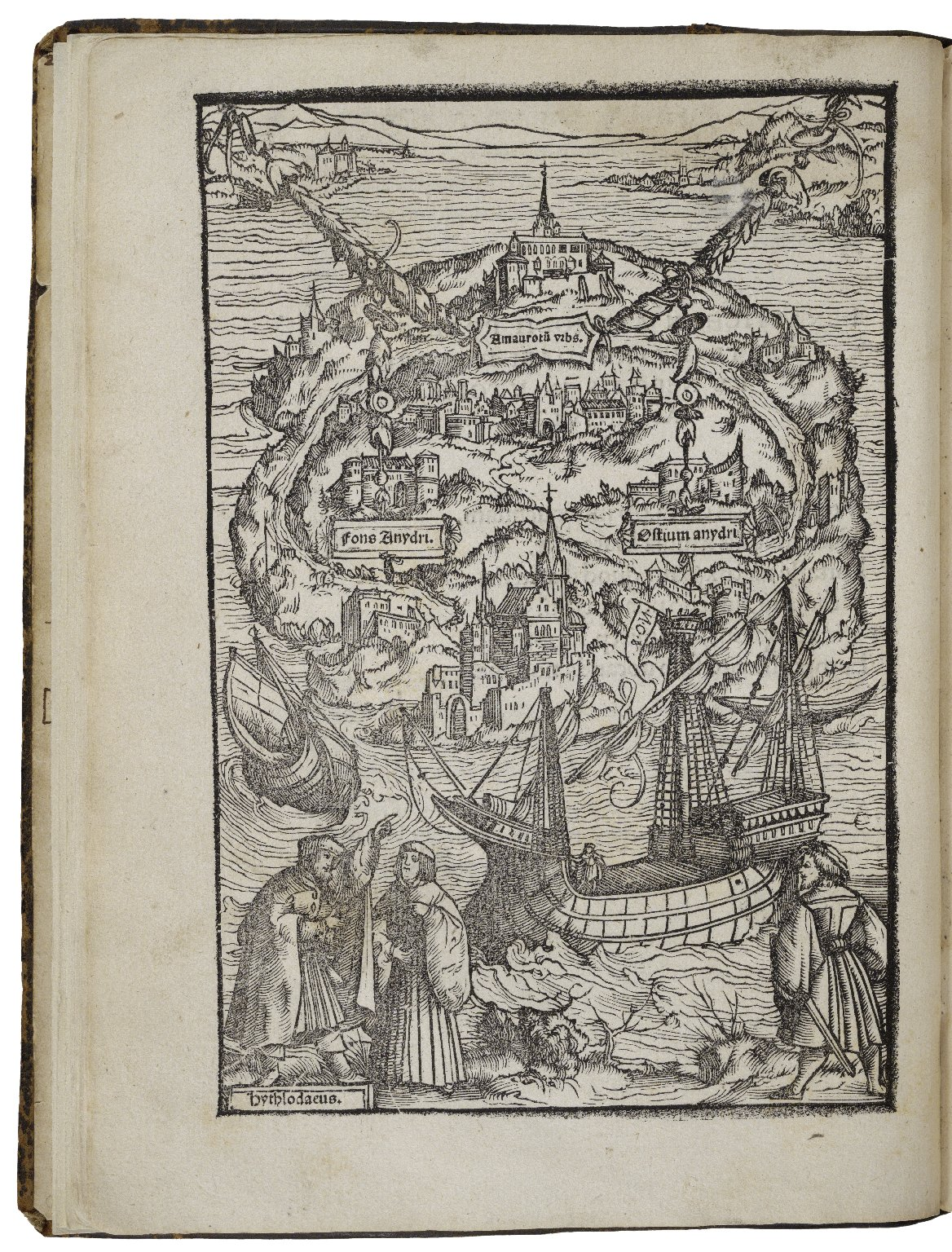
A woodcut by Ambrosius Holbein, illustrating a 1518 edition. In the lower left, Raphael describes the island Utopia.

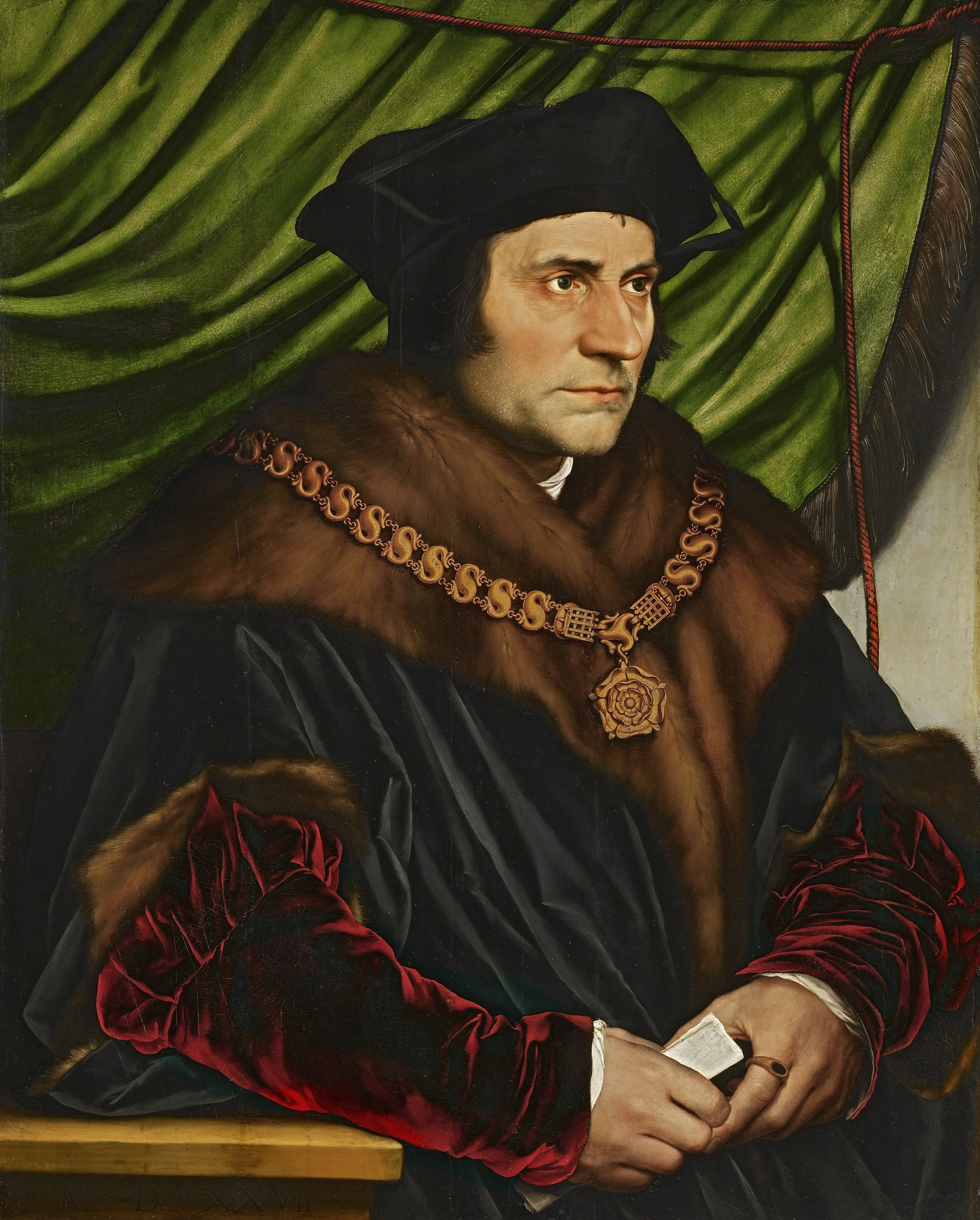
Sir Thomas More

The work begins with written correspondence between Thomas More and several people he had met in Europe: Peter Gilles, town clerk of Antwerp, and Hieronymus van Busleyden, counselor to Charles V. More chose those letters, which are communications between actual people, to further the plausibility of his fictional land. In the same spirit, the letters also include a specimen of the Utopian alphabet and its poetry. The letters explain the lack of widespread travel to Utopia; someone had coughed during the announcement of its exact longitude and latitude. The first book tells of the traveller Raphael Hythlodaeus, to whom More is introduced in Antwerp, and it also explores the subject of how best to counsel a prince, a popular topic at the time.

The first discussions with Raphael allow him to discuss some of the modern ills affecting Europe such as the tendency of kings to start wars and the subsequent loss of money on fruitless endeavours. He also criticises the use of execution to punish theft by saying that thieves might as well murder whom they rob, to remove witnesses, if the punishment is going to be the same, the abstract principle being "never to make it safer to follow out an evil plan than to repent of it." He lays most of the problems of theft on the practice of enclosure, the enclosing of common land, and the subsequent poverty and starvation of people who are denied access to land because of sheep farming.

More tries to convince Raphael that he could find a good job as a royal advisor, but Raphael says that his views are too radical and would not be listened to. Raphael sees himself in the tradition of Plato: he knows that for good governance, kings must act philosophically. He, however, points out:

Plato doubtless did well foresee, unless kings themselves would apply their minds to the study of philosophy, that else they would never thoroughly allow the council of philosophers, being themselves before, even from their tender age, infected and corrupt with perverse and evil opinions.

More seems to contemplate the duty of philosophers to work around and in real situations and, for the sake of political expediency, work within flawed systems to make them better, rather than hoping to start again from first principles.

... for in courts they will not bear with a man's holding his peace or conniving at what others do: a man must barefacedly approve of the worst counsels and consent to the blackest designs, so that he would pass for a spy, or, possibly, for a traitor, that did but coldly approve of such wicked practices.

=== Book 2: Discourse on Utopia ===
Utopia
- Utopia location
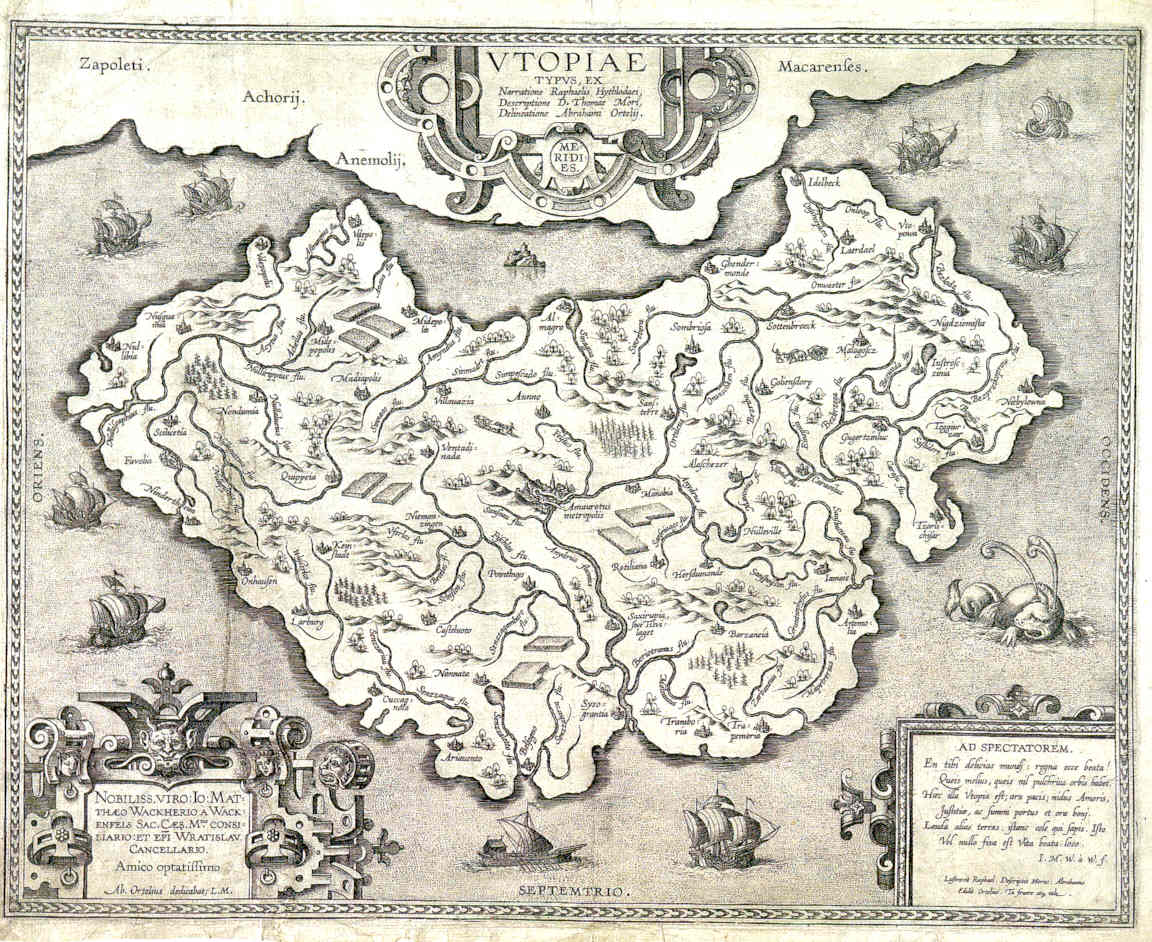
- Map by Ortelius, ca. 1595
- Created by: Thomas More
- Genre: Utopian fiction

In-universe information
- Other name: Abraxa (former name)
- Type: Republic/elective monarchy
- Ruled by: Prince (a.k.a. ademus)
- Location: New World
- Locations: Amaurot (capital), Anyder River

Utopia is placed in the New World and More links Raphael's travels with Amerigo Vespucci's real life voyages of discovery. He suggests that Raphael is one of the 24 men that Vespucci says he left for six months at Cabo Frio, Brazil in his Four Voyages of 1507. Raphael then travels further and finds the island of Utopia, where he spends five years observing the customs of the natives.

According to More, the island of Utopia is

…two hundred miles across in the middle part, where it is widest, and nowhere much narrower than this except towards the two ends, where it gradually tapers. These ends, curved round as if completing a circle five hundred miles in circumference, make the island crescent-shaped, like a new moon.

The island was originally a peninsula but a 15-mile wide channel was dug by the community's founder King Utopos to separate it from the mainland. The island contains 54 cities. Each city is divided into four equal parts. The capital city, Amaurot, is located directly in the middle of the crescent island.

Each city has not more than 6000 households, each family consisting of between 10 and 16 adults. Thirty households are grouped together and elect a Syphograntus (whom More says is now called a phylarchus). Every ten Syphogranti have an elected Traniborus (more recently called a protophylarchus) ruling over them. The 200 Syphogranti of a city elect a Prince in a secret ballot. The Prince stays for life unless he is deposed or removed for suspicion of tyranny.

People are redistributed around the households and towns to keep numbers even. If the island suffers from overpopulation, colonies are set up on the mainland. Alternatively, the natives of the mainland are invited to be part of the Utopian colonies, but if they dislike them and no longer wish to stay, they may return. In the case of underpopulation, the colonists are recalled.

There is no private property on Utopia, with goods being stored in warehouses and people requesting what they need. There are also no locks on the doors of the houses, and the houses are rotated between the citizens every ten years. Agriculture provides the most important occupation on the island. Every person is taught it and must live in the countryside, farming for two years at a time, with women doing the same work as men. Similarly, every citizen must learn at least one of the other essential trades: weaving (mainly done by the women), carpentry, metalsmithing and masonry. There is deliberate simplicity about the trades; for instance, all people wear the same types of simple clothes, and there are no dressmakers making fine apparel. All able-bodied citizens must work; thus, unemployment is eradicated, and the length of the working day can be minimized. The people have to work only six hours a day although many willingly work for longer. More does allow scholars in his society to become the ruling officials or priests, people picked during their primary education for their ability to learn. All other citizens, however, are encouraged to apply themselves to learning in their leisure time.

Although the Utopians view labor as dignified and mutually beneficial, labor is not ideologically attached to a citizen's happiness, status, or worth. The pursuit of happiness, which the Utopians think is the ultimate purpose of life, is accomplished during leisure time. The purpose of leisure time is to experience "true and natural pleasure," which is felt through pleasures of the mind and pleasures of the body. Pleasures of the mind include attending lectures, pursuing intellectual studies, and practicing spiritual virtues. Utopians define practicing spiritual virtues as “living according to nature,” which is viewed as one of the greatest pleasures, as they believe God created them for this purpose. Pleasures of the body are then divided into two categories. The first is the resolve of the body's physical needs; for example, eating when hungry, drinking when thirsty, scratching an itch, having children, and “something that excites our senses with a hidden but unmistakable force,” like music. This is seen as true and natural pleasure as long as there is not an overindulgence in their actions. The second type of pleasure is inherent in good health.

The Utopian philosophy of leisure and pleasure is closely tied to their ideas about religion. These ideas are united by reason, since the Utopians use reason to justify all of their societal practices. There are several religions on the island: moon-worshippers, sun-worshippers, planet-worshippers, ancestor-worshippers and monotheists, but each is tolerant of the others. Only atheists are despised (but allowed) in Utopia, as they are seen as representing a danger to the state: since they do not believe in any punishment or reward after this life, they have no reason to share the communistic life of Utopia and so will break the laws for their own gain. They are not banished, but are encouraged to talk out their erroneous beliefs with the priests until they are convinced of their error. Raphael says that through his teachings Christianity was beginning to take hold in Utopia. The toleration of all other religious ideas is enshrined in a universal prayer all the Utopians recite.

...but, if they are mistaken, and if there is either a better government, or a religion more acceptable to God, they implore His goodness to let them know it.

Slavery is a feature of Utopian life, and it is reported that every household has two slaves. The slaves are either from other countries (prisoners of war, people condemned to die, or poor people) or are the Utopian criminals. The criminals are weighed down with chains made out of gold. Gold is part of the community wealth of the country, and fettering criminals with it or using it for shameful things like chamber pots gives the citizens a healthy dislike of it. It also makes it difficult to steal, as it is in plain view. As a whole, wealth holds little importance and is good only for buying commodities from foreign nations or bribing the nations to fight each other. Slaves are periodically released for good behaviour. Jewels are worn by children, who finally give them up as they mature.

Other significant innovations of Utopia include a welfare state with free hospitals, euthanasia permissible by the state, priests being allowed to marry, divorce permitted, premarital sex punished by a lifetime of enforced celibacy and adultery being punished by enslavement. Meals are taken in community dining halls and the job of feeding the population is given to a different household in turn. Although all are fed the same, Raphael explains that the old and the administrators are given the best of the food. Travel on the island is permitted only with an internal passport, and any people found without a passport are, on the first occasion, returned in disgrace. After a second offence, they are placed in slavery. In addition, there are no lawyers. The law is made deliberately simple such that all Utopians will understand it, thus no one should be in doubt of what is right and wrong.

Wives are subject to their husbands, and husbands are subject to their wives, although women are mostly restricted to conducting household tasks. Only few widowed women become priests. While all are trained in military arts, women confess their sins to their husbands once a month. Gambling, hunting, makeup and astrology are all discouraged in Utopia. The role allocated to women in Utopia might, however, have been seen as being more liberal from a contemporary point of view.

Utopians do not like to engage in war. If they feel countries friendly to them have been wronged, they will send military aid, but they try to capture, rather than kill, enemies. They are upset if they achieve victory through bloodshed. The main purpose of war is to achieve what over which, if they had achieved already, they would not have gone to war. However, other scholars point to an apparent inconsistency of Utopian principles of war by considering their willingness to take neighboring territory by force when the Utopian population is in need of geographical expansion.

Privacy is not regarded as freedom in Utopia; taverns, ale houses and places for private gatherings are nonexistent, for the effect of keeping all men in full view, so they are obliged to behave well.

After Raphael's description of Utopia, he returns to the conversation with More and Giles to make a final comment on pride. He believes every commonwealth could function like Utopia if people could give up their pride. He ends this monologue with:

“Pride measures her advantages not by what she has but by what others lack. Pride would not condescend even to be made a goddess, if there were no wretches for her to sneer at and domineer over... Pride is a serpent from hell that twines itself around the hearts of men... Pride is too deeply fixed in human nature to be easily plucked out.”

Finally, More is alone and reflecting on the conversation. He says he does not agree with every aspect of Utopian society, but he admires it and wishes other societies would be more like Utopia.

== Framework ==
The story is written from the perspective of More himself. That was common at the time, and More uses his own name and background to create the narrator. The book is written in two parts: "Book one: Dialogue of Council," and "Book two: Discourse on Utopia."

The first book is told from the perspective of More, the narrator, who is introduced by his friend Peter Giles to a fellow traveller named Raphael Hythloday, whose name translates as "expert of nonsense" in Greek. In an amicable dialogue with More and Giles, Hythloday expresses strong criticism of then-modern practices in England and other Catholicism-dominated countries, such as the crime of theft being punishable by death, and the over-willingness of kings to start wars.

Book two has Hythloday tell his interlocutors about Utopia, where he has lived for five years, with the aim of convincing them about its superior state of affairs. Utopia turns out to share many of the features of (what would come to be called) a socialist state.

== Interpretation ==
One of the most troublesome questions about Utopia is Thomas More's reason for writing it. Most scholars see it as a comment on or criticism of 16th-century Catholicism since the evils of More's day are laid out in Book I and in many ways apparently solved in Book II. However, other scholars point to the fact that many of the solutions of Book II contradict those beliefs actually held by More the author, who never advocated for the truth of a perfect Utopian society. Instead, it is likely that the fictional island was simply a progressive step away from the world in which he lived.

Raphael's sentiments in Book I can be read as anti-monarchist, reflective of the internal debate that More later grappled with. England had recently (1513) conquered the region of Tournai in modern-day Belgium, and Henry VIII was adopting increasingly imperialist and absolutist statements in his contentious letters with Pope Leo X, which alarmed several of his courtiers. More, who lived nearby and visited Tournai at the time, responded in Book II with the ideal of a republic: "an elected prince, hedged by a council of Syphogrants, in order to make tyranny impossible;" without any notion of sovereignty.

Recent scholarship has also attempted to provide a new way in which to explore the questions surrounding More's intent by shedding light on the complicated ways in which Utopia handles the humanist principles that had grown popular by the 16th century. Building on the earlier work of J.H. Hexter, who argued that Utopia is to be read as an example of More's critique of Christian humanism, modern scholars have suggested that Utopia is actually an example of More's criticism of the humanist principles advanced by his contemporary and friend, Erasmus. Classical scholar Giulia Sissa claims that Hythloday is a parody of Erasmus further arguing that Utopia was meant more as a satirization of Erasmus' In Praise of Folly which Utopia does seem to mimic structurally. This, along with other implicit details of Utopia, present an argument against the notion that Utopia was meant to be understood as More's suggestion of a serious political theory. However, the understanding of Utopia as a parody of Erasmus is perhaps made more complicated when considered alongside the fact that Erasmus is known to have read the second book of Utopia prior to its publication and was even inspired to write a poem to be included in the work.

Also, the puzzle is that some of the practices and institutions of the Utopians, such as the ease of divorce, euthanasia and both married priests and female priests, seem to be polar opposites of More's beliefs and the teachings of the Catholic Church of which he was a devout member. Another often cited contradiction, as noted by scholars, including Leland Miles, is that of the religious tolerance of Utopia contrasted with his alleged persecution of Protestants as Lord Chancellor. Similarly, the criticism of lawyers comes from a writer who, as Lord Chancellor, was arguably the most influential lawyer in England, but who had championed the introduction of the new legal principle of equity into English law. It can be answered, however, that as a pagan society Utopians had the best ethics that could be reached through reason alone; or that officers of the Crown, as servants of the law and King, must do things they personally disagree with; or that More changed from his early life to his later when he was Lord Chancellor.

One highly influential interpretation of Utopia is that of the intellectual historian Quentin Skinner. He has argued that More was taking part in the Renaissance humanist debate over true nobility, and that he was writing to prove the perfect commonwealth could not occur with private property. Crucially, Skinner sees Raphael Hythlodaeus as embodying the Platonic view that philosophers should not get involved in politics, but the character of More embodies the more pragmatic Ciceronian view. Thus, the society Raphael proposes is the ideal that More would want. However, without communism, which he saw no possibility of occurring, it was wiser to take a more pragmatic view.

Quentin Skinner's interpretation of Utopia is consistent with the speculation that Stephen Greenblatt made in The Swerve: How the World Became Modern. There, Greenblatt argued that More was under the Epicurean influence of Lucretius's On the Nature of Things and the people that live in Utopia were an example of how pleasure has become their guiding principle of life. Although Greenblatt acknowledged that More's insistence on the existence of an afterlife and punishment for people holding contrary views were inconsistent with the essentially materialist view of Epicureanism, Greenblatt contended that it was the minimum conditions for what the pious More would have considered as necessary to live a happy life.

Another complication comes from the Greek meanings of the names of people and places in the work. Apart from Utopia, meaning "Noplace," several other lands are mentioned: Achora meaning "Nolandia", Polyleritae meaning "Muchnonsense", Macarenses meaning "Happiland," and the river Anydrus meaning "Nowater". Raphael's last name, Hythlodaeus means "dispenser of nonsense" or "well-learned in nonsense" surely implying that the whole of the Utopian text is 'nonsense'. Additionally the Latin rendering of More's name, Morus, is similar to the word for a fool in Greek (μωρός). It is unclear whether More is simply being ironic, an in-joke for those who know Greek, seeing as the place he is talking about does not actually exist or whether there is actually a sense of distancing of Hythlodaeus' and the More's ("Morus") views in the text from his own. Irony was one of the "characteristic rhetorical devices" that More utilized, leading scholars to question the extent of his usage.

The name Raphael, though, may have been chosen by More to remind his readers of the archangel Raphael who is mentioned in the Book of Tobit (3:17; 5:4, 16; 6:11, 14, 16, 18; also in chs. 7, 8, 9, 11, 12). In that book the angel guides Tobias and later cures his father of his blindness. While Hythlodaeus may suggest his words are not to be trusted, Raphael meaning (in Hebrew) "God has healed" suggests that the name Raphael may signal that this character's message is that which can open the eyes of the reader to what is true. The suggestion that More may have agreed with the views of Raphael is given weight by the way he dressed; with "his cloak... hanging carelessly about him", a style that Roger Ascham reports that More himself was wont to adopt. Furthermore, more recent criticism has questioned the reliability of both Gile's annotations and the character of "More" in the text itself. Claims that the book only subverts Utopia and Hythlodaeus are possibly oversimplistic.

In Humans and Animals in Thomas More’s Utopia, Christopher Burlinson argues that More intended to produce a fictional space in which ethical concerns of humanity and bestial inhumanity could be explored. Burlinson regards the Utopian criticisms of finding pleasure in the spectacle of bloodshed as reflective of More's own anxieties about the fragility of humanity and the ease in which humans fall to beast-like ways. According to Burlinson, More interprets that decadent expression of animal cruelty as a causal antecedent for the cruel intercourse present within the world of Utopia and More's own. Burlinson does not argue that More explicitly equates animal and human subjectivities, but is interested in More's treatment of human-animal relations as significant ethical concerns intertwined with religious ideas of salvation and the divine qualities of souls.

In Indian Givers: How the Indians of the Americas Transformed the World, Jack Weatherford asserts that Native American societies played an inspirational role for More's writing. The early British and French settlers in the 1500 and 1600s were relatively shocked to see how the Native Americans moved around so freely across the untamed land, not beholden by debt, "lack of magistrates, forced services, riches, poverty or inheritance". Arthur Morgan hypothesized that Utopia was More's description of the Inca Empire, although it is implausible that More was aware of them when he wrote the book.

In Utopian Justifications: More’s Utopia, Settler Colonialism, and Contemporary Ecocritical Concerns, Susan Bruce juxtaposes Utopian justifications for the violent dispossession of idle peoples unwilling to surrender lands that are underutilized with Peter Kosminsky's The Promise, a 2011 television drama centered around Zionist settler colonialism in modern-day Palestine. Bruce's treatment of Utopian foreign policy, which mirrored European concerns in More's day, situates More's text as an articulation of settler colonialism. Bruce identifies an isomorphic relationship between Utopian settler logic and the account provided by The Promise’s Paul, who recalls his father's criticism of Palestinians as undeserving, indolent, and animalistic occupants of the land. Bruce interprets the Utopian fixation with material surplus as foundational for exploitative gift economies, which ensnare Utopia's bordering neighbors into a subservient relationship of dependence in which they remain in constant fear of being subsumed by the superficially generous Utopians.

== Historical context ==
Utopia began while More was an envoy in the Low Countries in May 1515. More started by writing the introduction and the description of the society that would become the second half of the work, and on his return to England, he wrote the "dialogue of counsel." The work was completed in September 1516 and was given to Desiderius Erasmus. In the same year, it was printed in Leuven under Erasmus's editorship, and after revisions by More, it was printed in Basel in November 1518. It was not until 1551, sixteen years after More's execution, that it was first published in England as an English translation by Ralph Robinson. As noted in a study by David Weil Baker, which was discussed by William T. Cotton, there was a second translation by Ralph Robinson in 1556. Gilbert Burnet's translation of 1684 is probably the most commonly cited version.

During the English Renaissance, many writers and scholars (including More) had a deep interest in ancient Greek and Roman literature. As a result, many English scholars identified with Humanist philosophy, a school of thought drawing from antiquity that is interested in the individual human experience, human potential, and the power of logic and reason. More's Humanist ideas and knowledge of texts from antiquity, specifically Plato, is a widely accepted influence of More's socialist society in Utopia. The intended audience for Utopia would have been More's intellectual peer group, a society of Northern Renaissance Humanists.

Raphael and More's debate in Book I about the duty of philosophers likely mirrors issues that More himself was contemplating in his real life. In Thomas More on Statesmanship, Gerard Wegemer writes that during More's time lecturing under the direction of William Grocyn, More was forced to "confront all the hopes and dreams of the Renaissance, at a time when [More] was trying to decide whether he should work in the city or leave that city to join a monastery." Additionally, More spent several years as a Carthusian monk, followed by working as a reader at Furnival's Inn for three years, all the while contemplating his commitment to a lifetime of active service to the commonwealth or contemplative service to the Church.

More also worked for a brief time as an English merchant during the infancy of England's participation in the European capitalist market. More saw first-hand the effects that the rising demand for wool had on farm workers, such as people getting expelled from their land, increasing poverty, and rising crime rates. Karl Kautsky theorizes that this caused More to develop a critical attitude toward capitalism, reflected in the socialist ideals of Utopia.

Despite being written over a decade before, critics have drawn connections between Utopia and More's service as Lord Chancellor to King Henry VIII. Christopher Warner argues in the article "Sir Thomas More, Utopia, and the Representation of Henry VIII" that it "reflects very well on Henry that the author of such a persuasive case against entering a king's service would agree to enter into his." As Lord Chancellor, More certainly encountered the very issues that Raphael raises, facing pressure from Henry VIII to support annulling his marriage to Catherine of Aragon and assuming the role of supreme head of the Church of England. More's staunch opposition ultimately resulted in him falling out of favor with Henry VIII, until his execution in 1535.

Historian Joanne Paul notes that More's sentiments on common and private property in Utopia also appear in his Letter to a Monk, written three years later. He writes, "God showed great foresight when he instituted all things in common," because "corrupt moral nature cannot cherish what is private without detriment to what is common." More argues that private interests inherently distract from "the service of the common good," a theme he would continue to explore throughout his other writings.

The work seems to have been popular, if misunderstood, since the introduction of More's Epigrams of 1518 mentions a man who did not regard More as a good writer. They were published with Utopia's third edition but later reworked.

== Influence ==
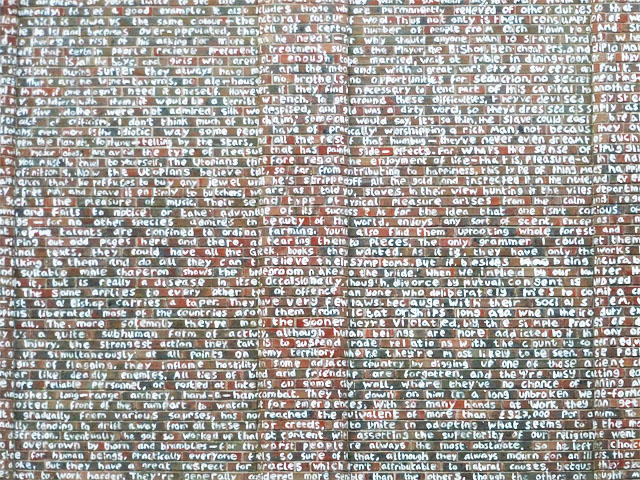
Text from Utopia painted on a brick wall in Norwich, England

The word 'utopia', invented by More as the name of his fictional island and used as the title of his book, has since entered the English language to describe any imagined place or state of things in which everything is perfect. The antonym 'dystopia' is used for hypothetical places of great suffering or injustice, including systems that present or market themselves as utopian but actually have terrible other sides to them.

Although he may not have directly founded the contemporary notion of what has since become known as Utopian and dystopian fiction, More certainly popularised the idea of imagined parallel realities, and some of the early works that owe a debt to Utopia must include The City of the Sun by Tommaso Campanella, Description of the Republic of Christianopolis by Johannes Valentinus Andreae, New Atlantis by Francis Bacon and Candide by Voltaire.

Utopian socialism was used to describe the first concepts of socialism; connections can be drawn between Marx's writings and the ideas presented in Utopia. Similarly to More, Marx equates private property ownership to class oppression and calls for its abolishment in The German Ideology. Both would have agreed on the importance of the communal ownership of land in addition to owning the means of production. Additionally, Marx likely would have held related views regarding sheep enclosures in England. He wrote that landlords of this period were "transformed into the captain of industry, into a capitalist," referring to the exploitation of tenant farmers by landowners. Marx and More both disapproved of capital punishment and saw the possibility of fulfillment and contentment for individuals living in a society in which property is communally owned. However, later Marxist theorists tend to see More's ideas as too simplistic and not grounded on realistic principles.

Some theorists argue that More created Utopia as purposefully idealistic, similar to Plato’s Republic or Laws, which are major sources More draws from in Utopia. The specificities of More’s idealistic versus pragmatic approach to socialism has been debated by many scholars.

An applied example of More's Utopia can be seen in Vasco de Quiroga's implemented society in Michoacán, Mexico, which was directly inspired by More's work. This began with the Hospitals of Santa Fe, which served as a safe-haven for Indigenous people. Quiroga's society mirrored Utopia in a few obvious ways: the lands of the "hospital towns" were regarded as communal property, inhabitants were encouraged to learn a manual trade alongside the main trade of agriculture, workdays were only six hours long, and profits were distributed equally among the people.

During the opening scene in the film A Man for All Seasons, Utopia is mentioned in a conversation. The alleged amorality of England's priests is compared to that of the more highly principled behaviour of the fictional priests in More's Utopia when characters observe that "In this country, every second bastard born is fathered by a priest. In Utopia that could never be. Why? There, the priests are very holy. Therefore very few."

In 2006, the artist Rory Macbeth inscribed all 40,000 words on the side of an old electricity factory in Norwich, England.

The fantastic voyage genre owes to Lucian's A True Story; in his lifetime More was better known as a translator of Lucian's satires, with Erasmus, than for Utopia.

In the anime movie Doraemon: Nobita's Sky Utopia it deals with the consequences of the Utopia.
