= Hans Holbein the Elder =

German painter

- Hans Holbein der Ältere
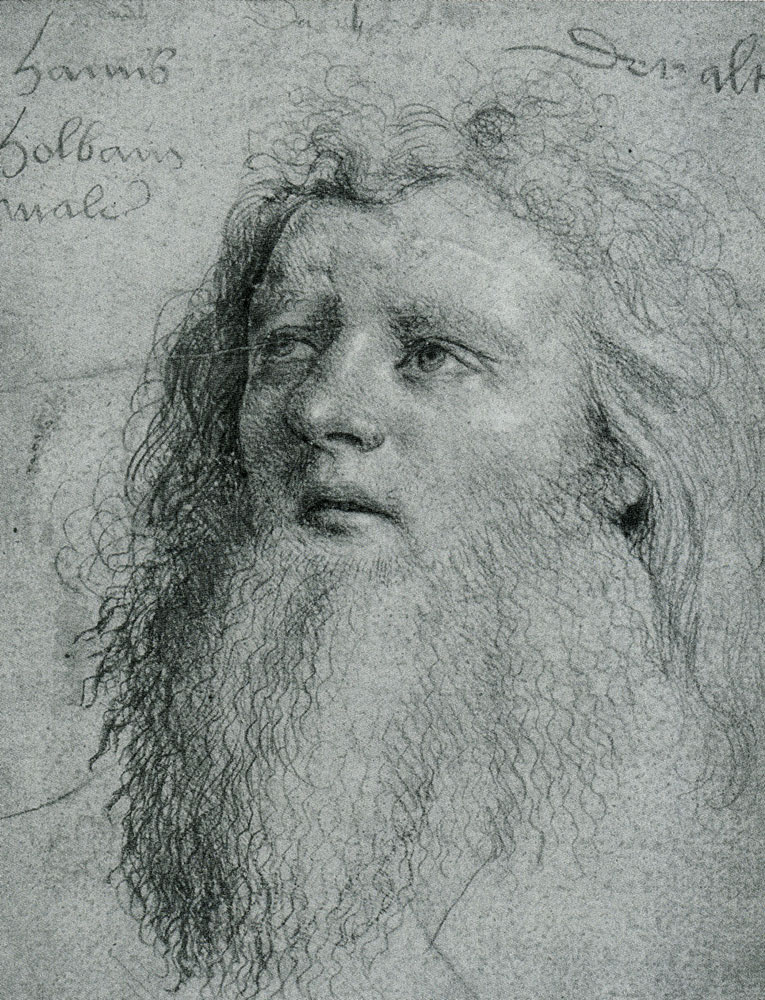
- Self-portrait, c. 1516
- Born: Hans Holbein c. 1460; Augsburg (free imperial city), Holy Roman Empire
- Died: 1524 (aged 63–64); Issenheim, Alsace, Holy Roman Empire
- Movement: Late Gothic
- Children: Hans Holbein the Younger; Ambrosius Holbein
- Father: Michael Holbein
- Relatives: Sigmund Holbein (brother)

Hans Holbein the Elder (Note: UK: /ˈhɒlbaɪn/ HOL-byne, US: /ˈhoʊlbaɪn, ˈhɔːl-/ HOHL-byne, HAWL-; German: Hans Holbein der Ältere) (c. 1460/65 – 1524) was a German painter of the early German Renaissance. He was the father of painters Ambrosius and Hans the Younger.

== Life ==
Holbein was born in the free imperial city of Augsburg (Germany), and died in Issenheim, Alsace (now France). He belonged to a celebrated family of painters; his father was Michael Holbein; his brother was Sigmund Holbein (died 1540). He had two sons, both artists and printmakers: Ambrosius Holbein (c. 1494 – c. 1519) and Hans Holbein the Younger (c. 1497 – 1543), who both had their first painting lessons from their father.

The date of Holbein's birth is unknown. His name appears in the Augsburg tax books in 1494, superseding that of his father. As early as 1493, Holbein had a following, and he worked that year at the abbey at Weingarten, creating the wings of an altarpiece representing Joachim's Offering, the Nativity of the Virgin Mary's Presentation in the Temple, and the Presentation of Christ. Today they hang in separate panels in the cathedral of Augsburg.

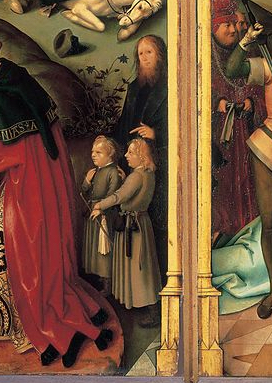
Hans Holbein the Elder's Basilica of St. Paul, with portraits of the artist and his sons

Holbein painted richly colored religious works. His later paintings show how he pioneered and led the transformation of German art from the (Late) International Gothic to the Renaissance style. In addition to the altar paintings that are his principal works, he also designed church windows and woodcuts. The surviving prints that can be attributed to him are few and a new one has recently been added to the group, an Annunciation to the Virgin in the collection of the Universitätbibliothek in Erlangen. He also made a number of portrait drawings that foreshadow the work of his famous son, Hans Holbein the Younger.

Holbein first appears at Augsburg, partnered with his brother Sigismund (who died in 1540 at Bern, Switzerland). Augsburg, at the time of Maximilian I, Holy Roman Emperor, cultivated art with a Flemish style, and felt the influence of the schools of Bruges and Brussels, even though it was near Italy, with close commercial connections to Venice. Sigismund was also a painter, but Hans had the lead of the partnership and signed all the works they produced.

In 1514 his sons left Augsburg and eventually both settled in Basel. After 1516 Holbein was declared a tax defaulter in Augsburg, which forced him to accept commissions abroad. He had worked in Alsace in 1509, and he seemed to have maintained some contacts there. At Issenheim in Alsace, where Matthias Grünewald was employed at the time, Holbein found patrons and was contracted to complete an altarpiece. His brother Sigismund and others sued him in Augsburg for unpaid debts. Pursued by Augsburg authorities, he fled Issenheim, abandoning his work and equipment, and went to Basel. He died two years later at an unknown location. After 1524 his name no longer appeared on the register of the Augsburg guild.

Holbein the Elder portrayed himself and his two sons in the left-hand panel of the 1504 altar-piece triptych the Basilica of St. Paul.

== Gallery ==
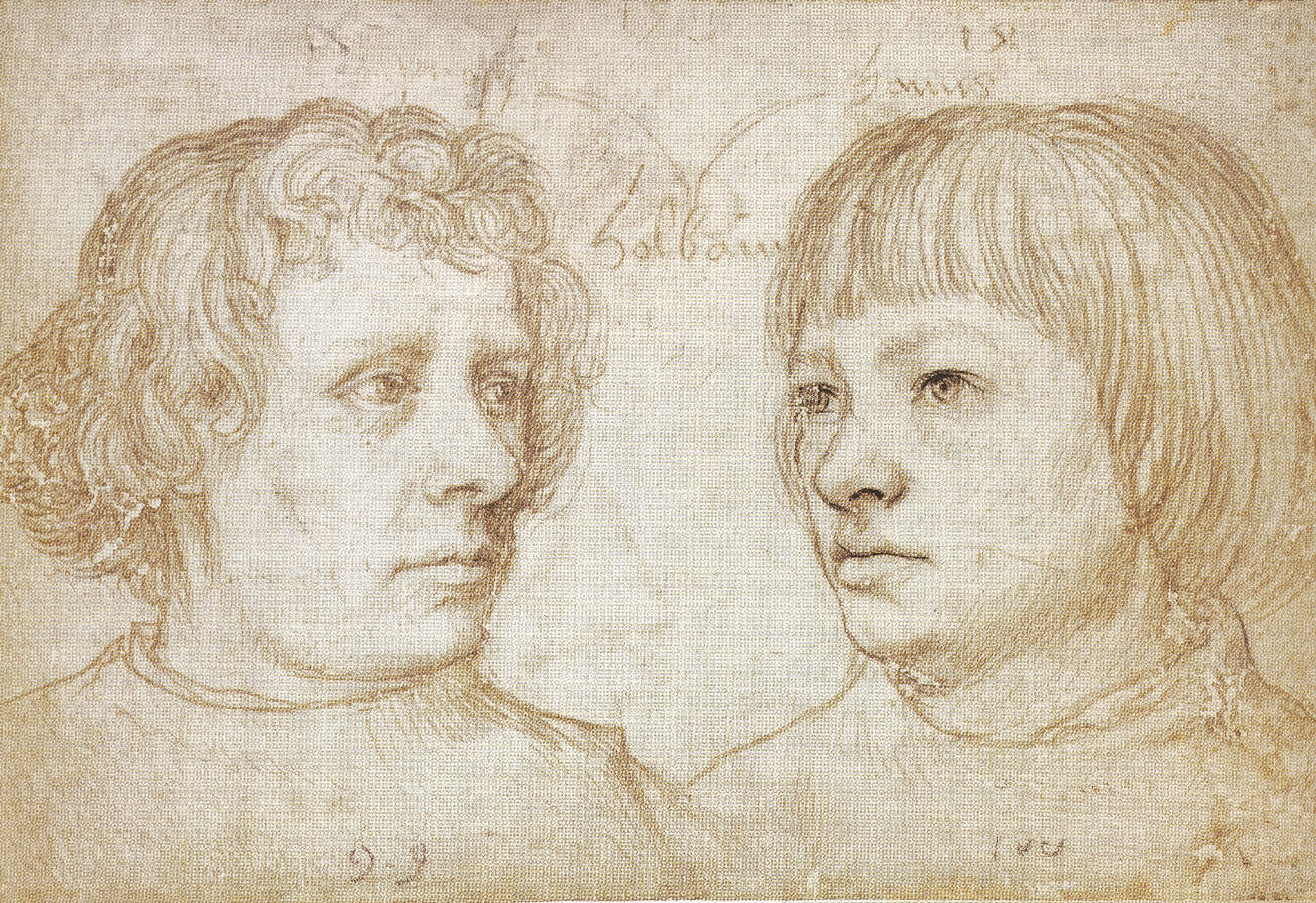
His sons, Ambrosius and Hans Holbein, by Hans Holbein the Elder

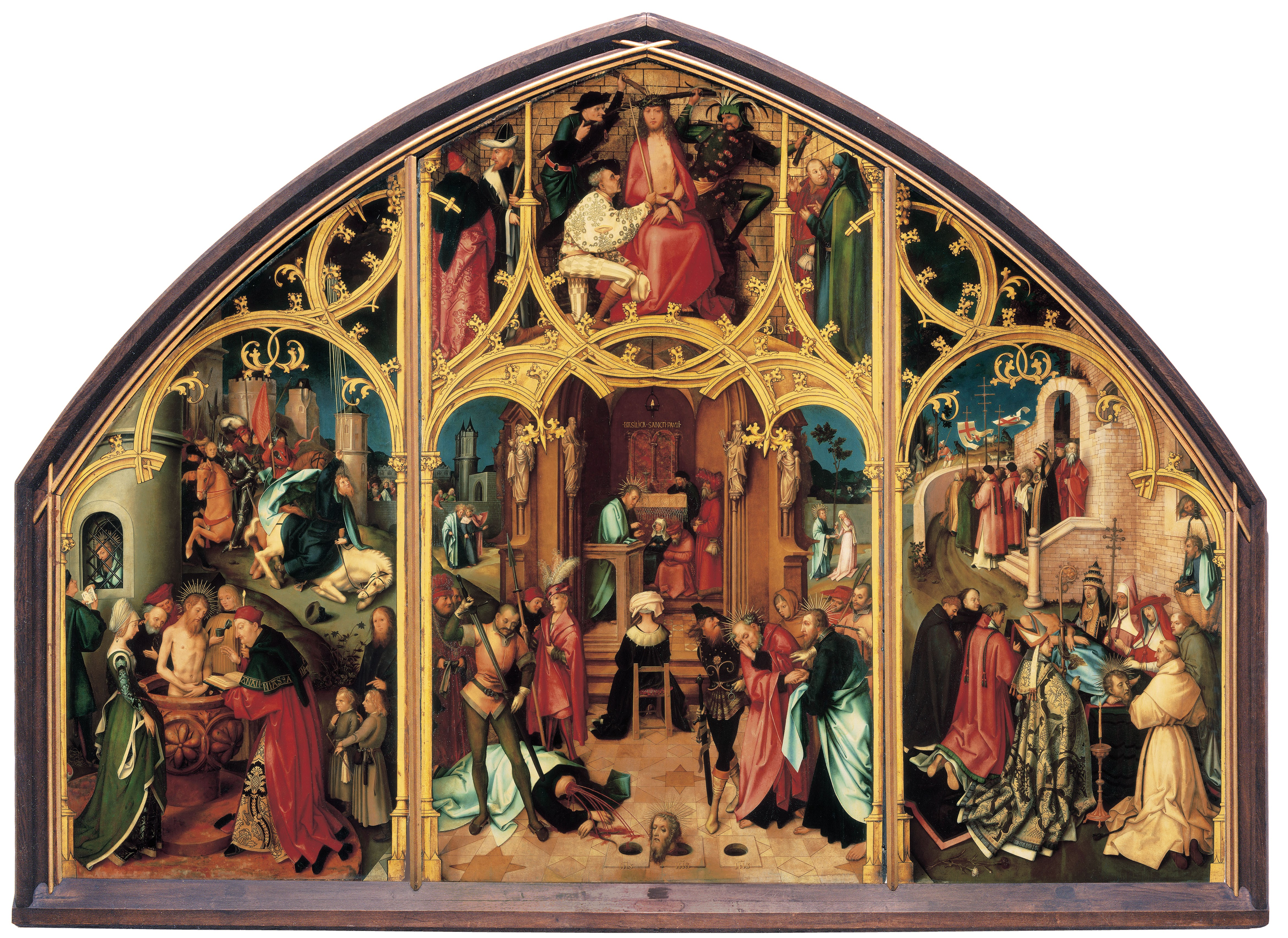
Basilica of St. Paul

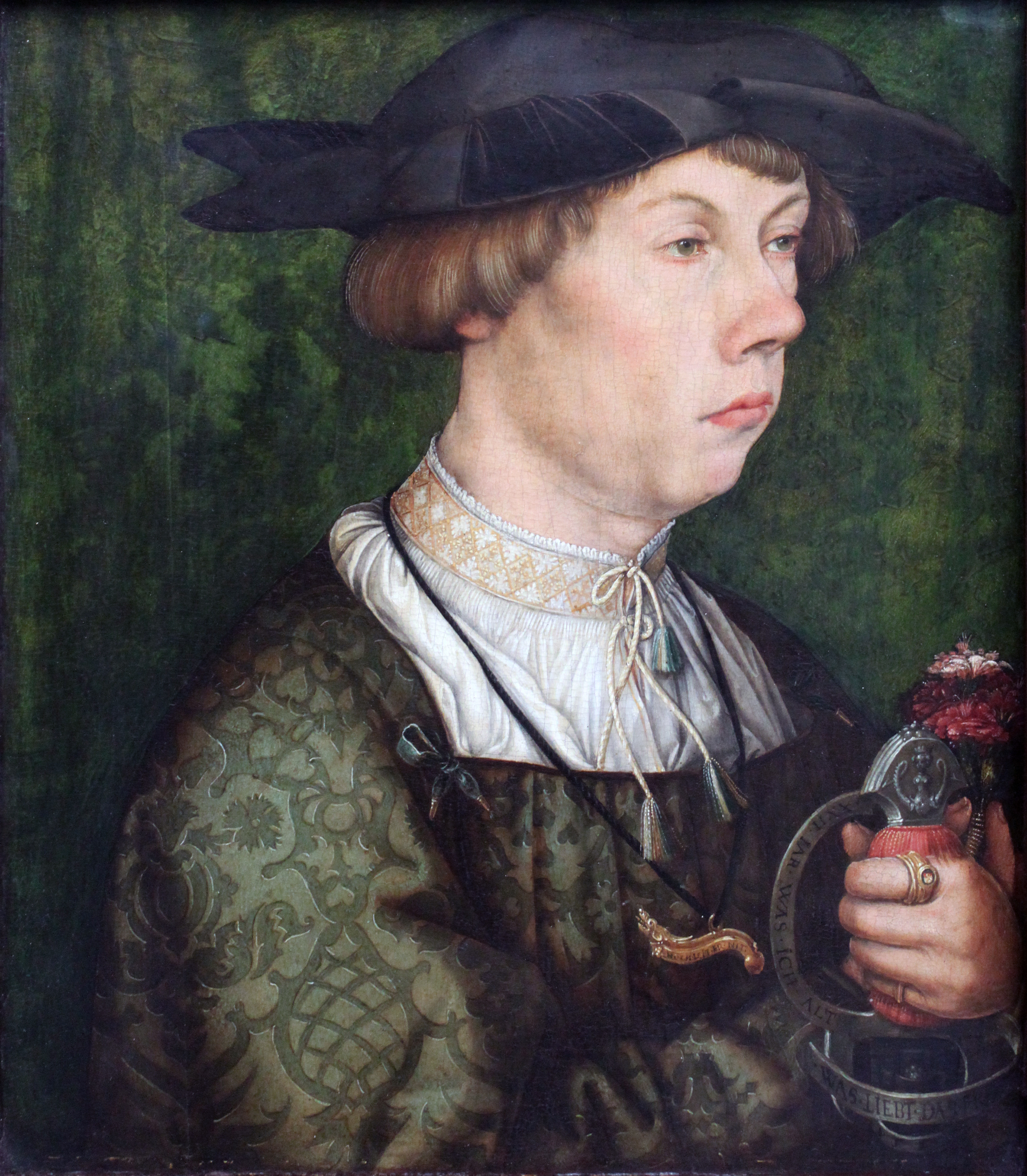
Portrait of a Member of the Weiss Family of Augsburg

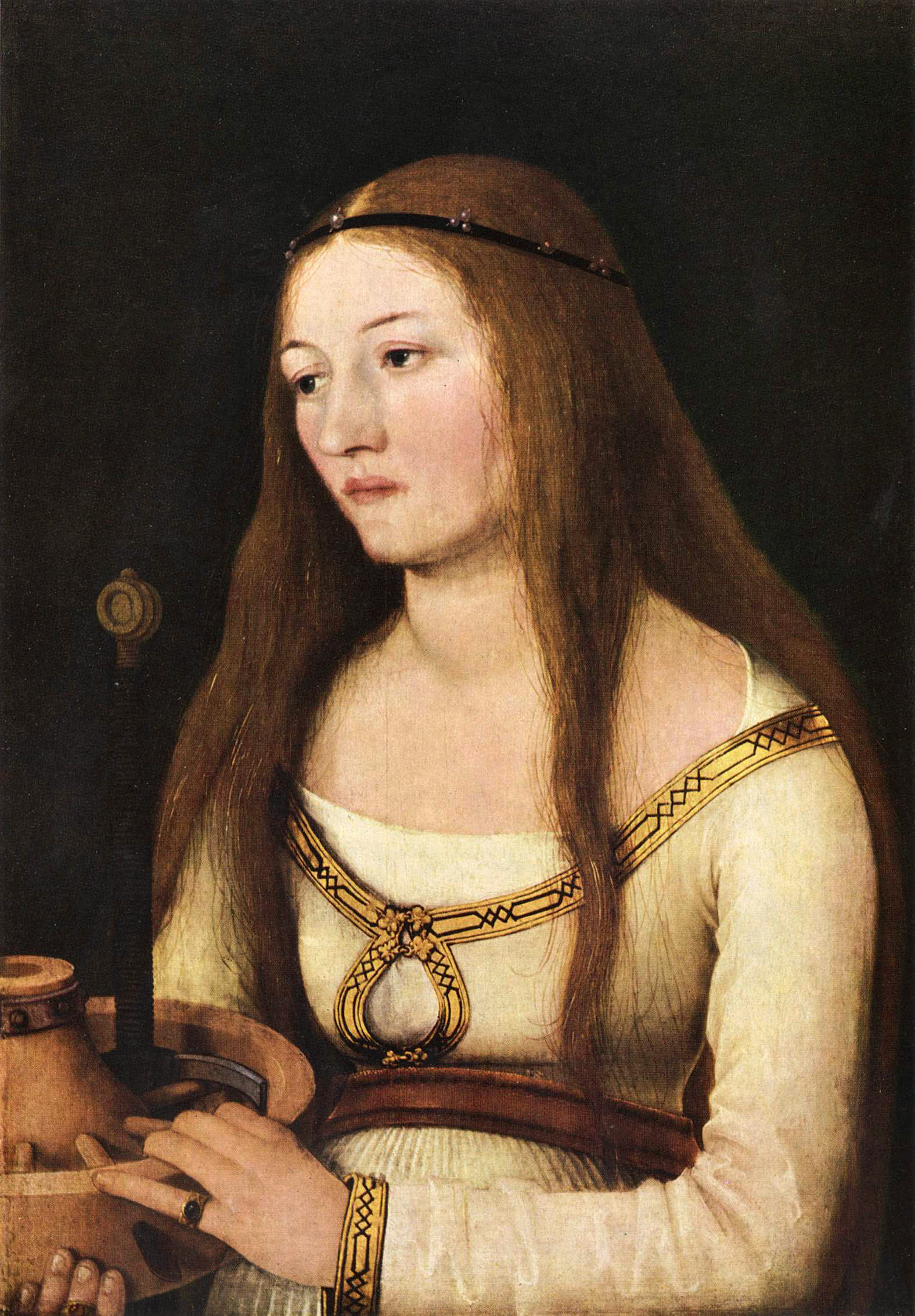
Portrait of a woman

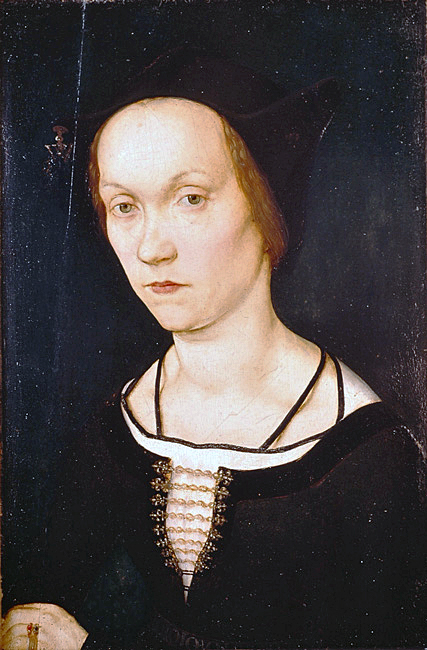
Portrait of a Woman, c. 1515

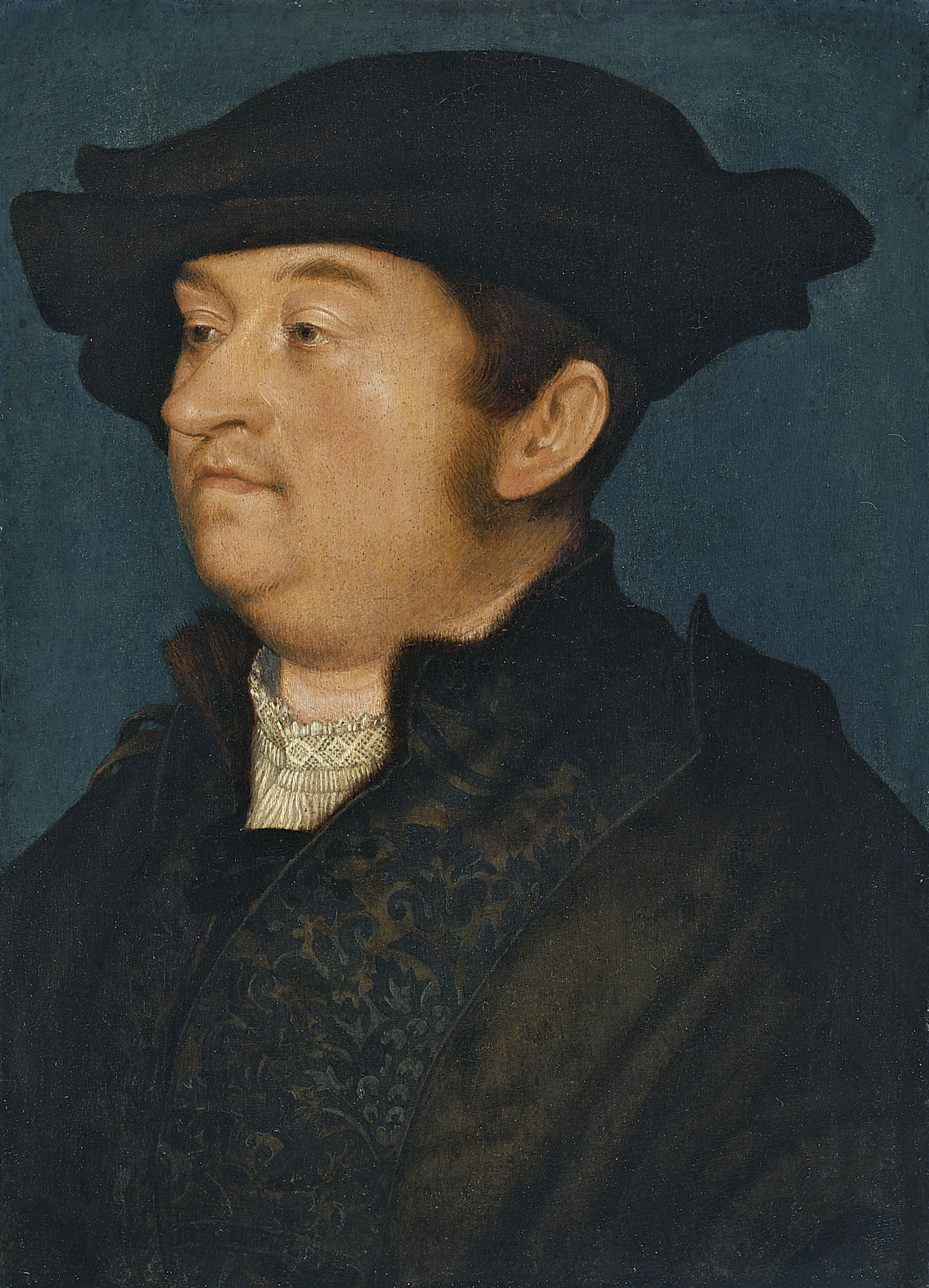
Portrait of a man, (1491)

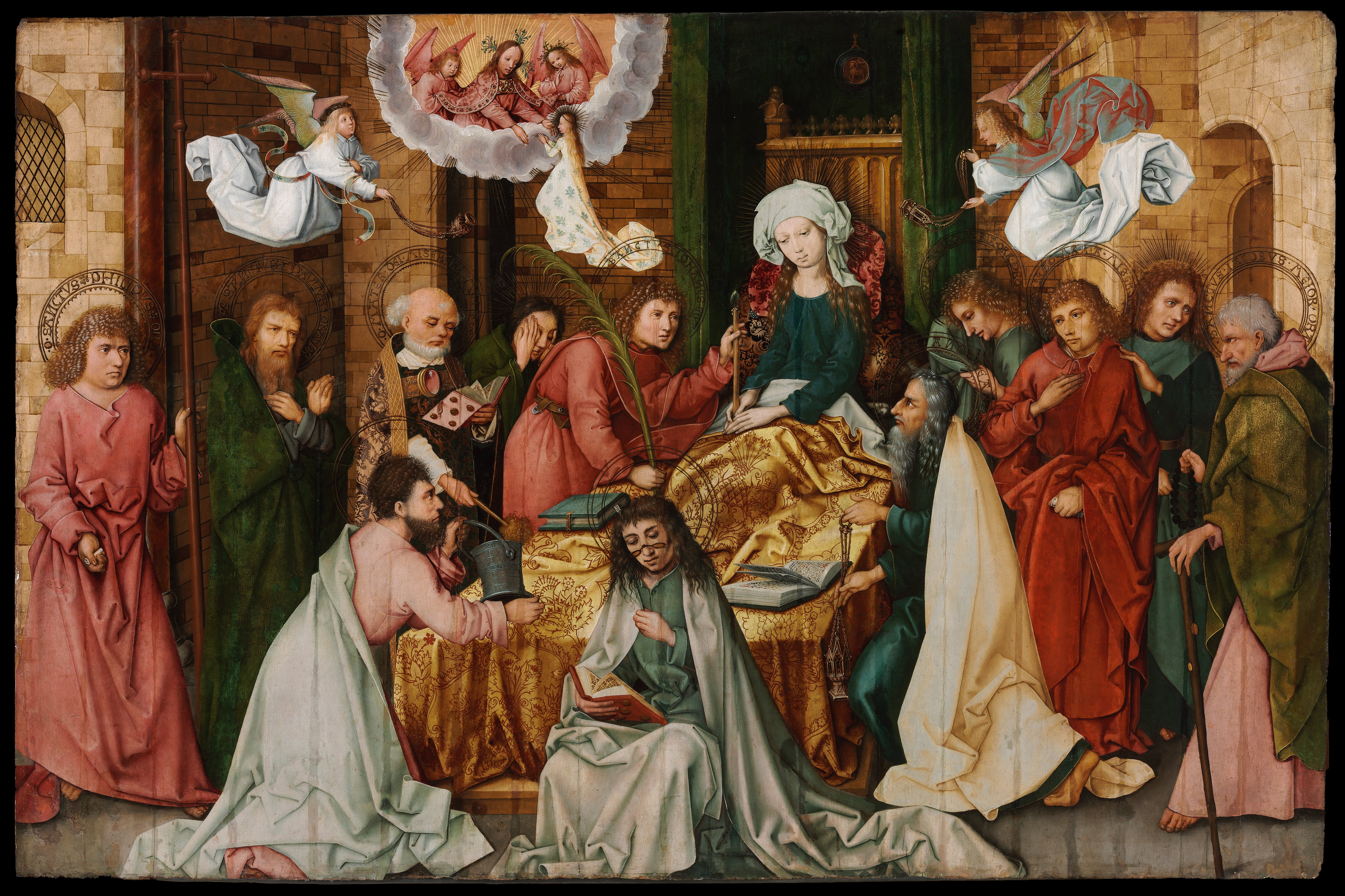
The Dormition of the Virgin

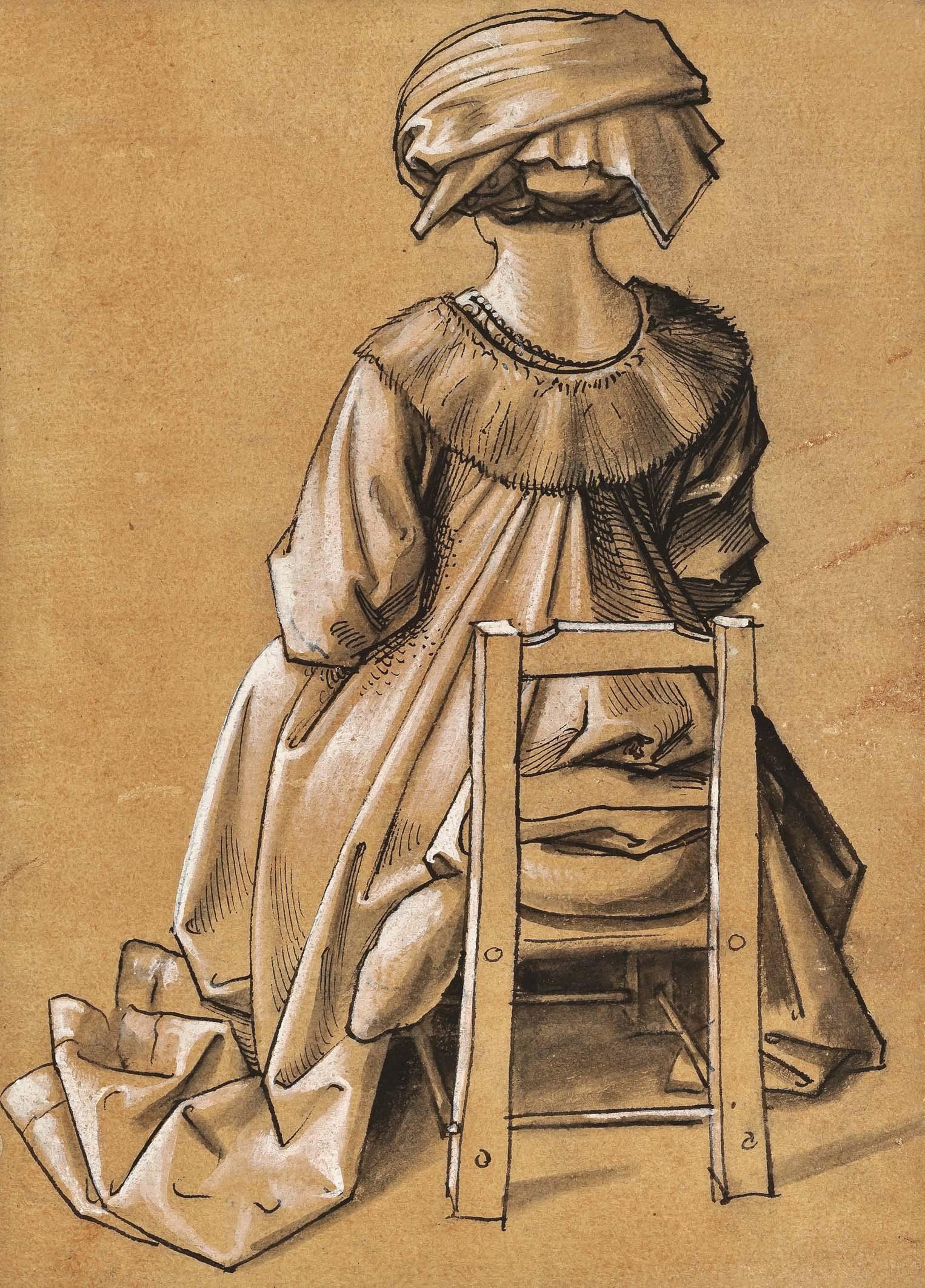
Drawing

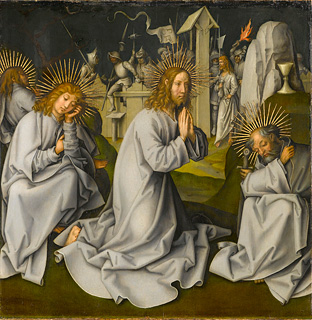
Christ on the Mount of Olives, part of his Grey Passion series

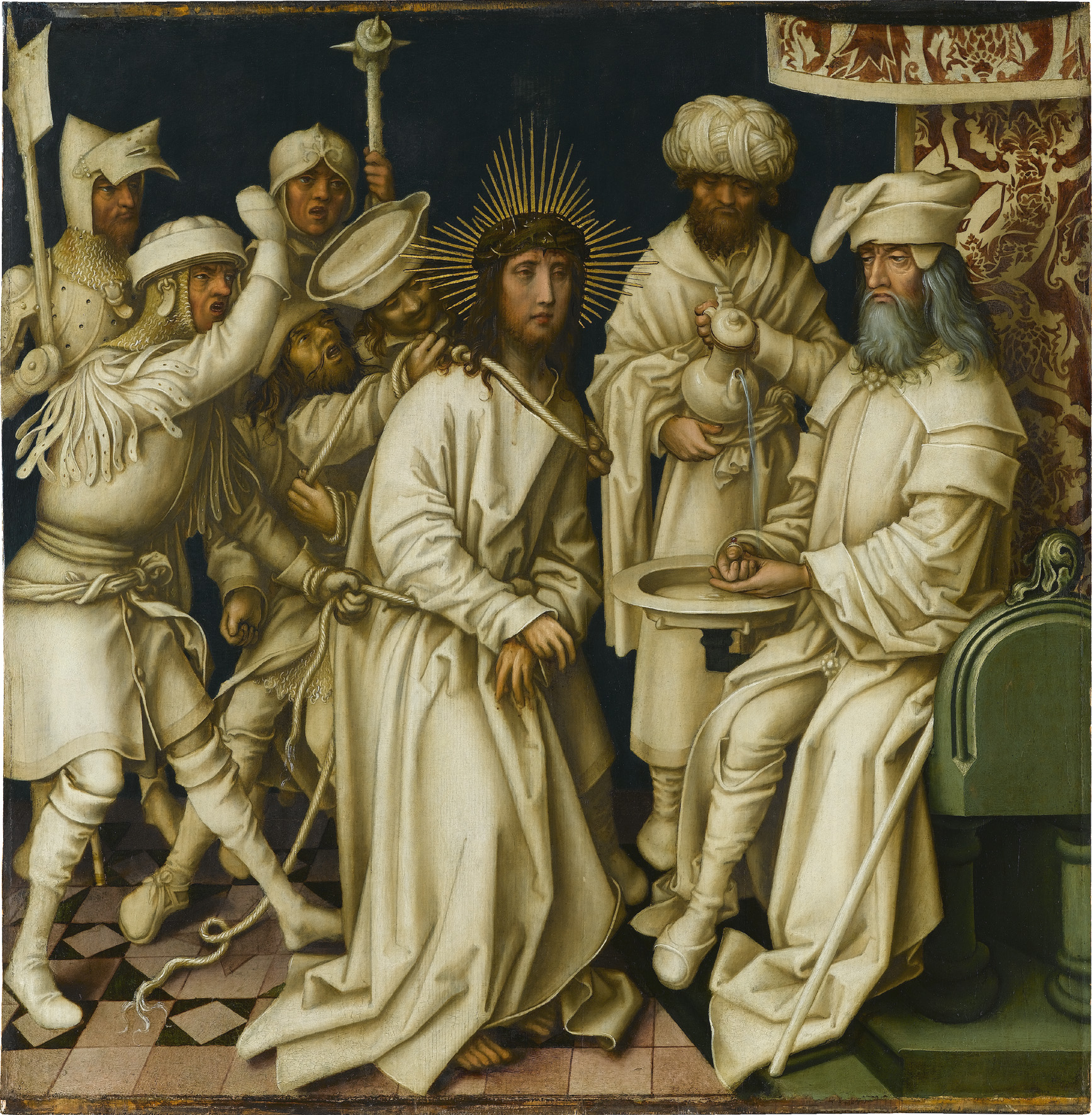
Pontius Pilate washing his hands

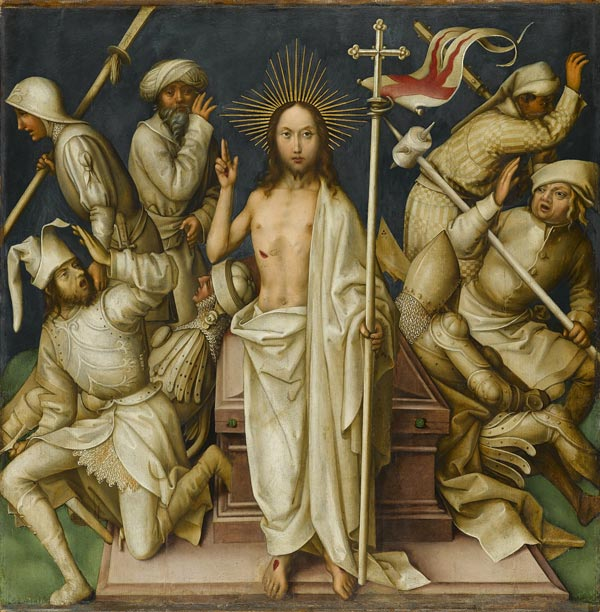
Resurrection, part of his Grey Passion series

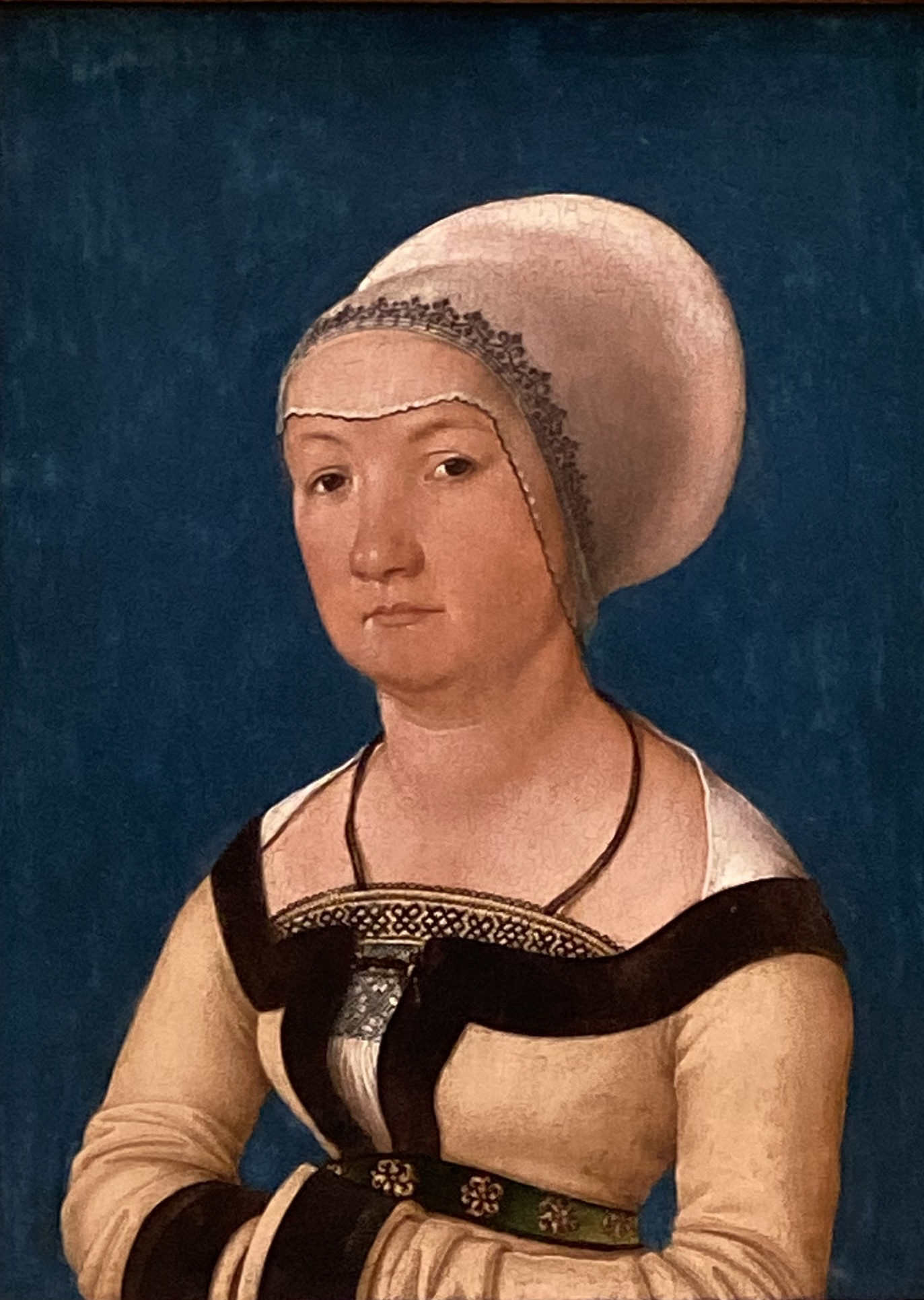
Wife of Jörg Fischer in the Kunstmuseum Basel

== See also ==
- Early Renaissance painting
