= Ambrosius Holbein =

Swiss painter (c.1494–c.1519)

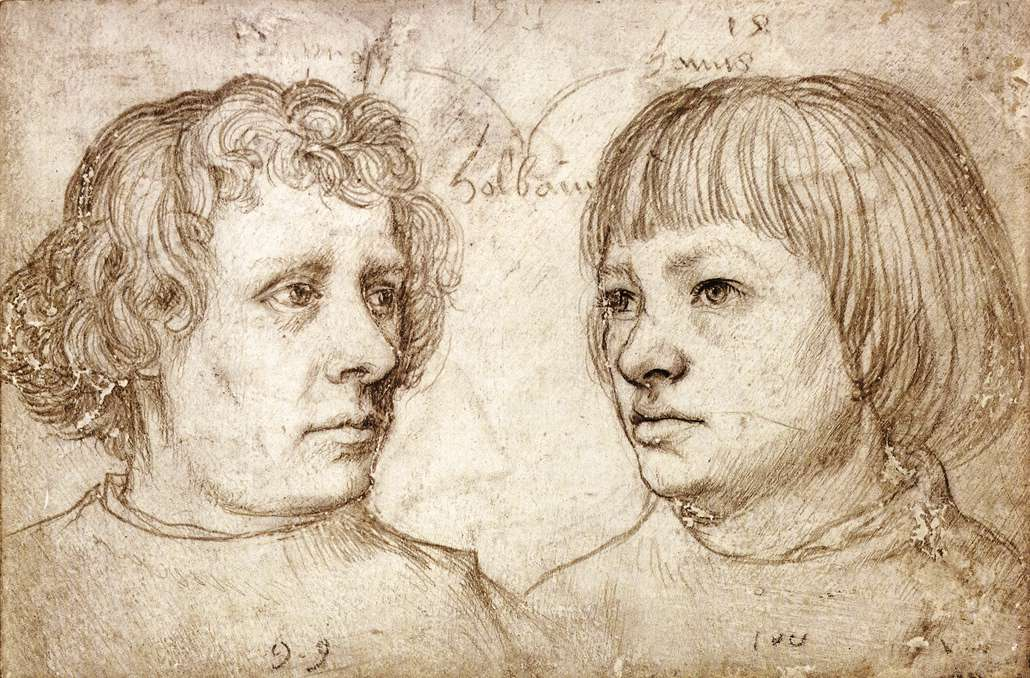
- Hans Holbein the Elder, Portrait of his sons Ambrosius and Hans (1511)
- Born: Ambrosius Holbein c. 1494; Free Imperial City of Augsburg
- Died: c. 1519 (aged 24–25); Basel, Switzerland
- Education: Hans Holbein the Elder
- Known for: Painting
- Movement: Northern Renaissance
- Father: Hans Holbein the Elder
- Relatives: Hans Holbein the Younger (brother)

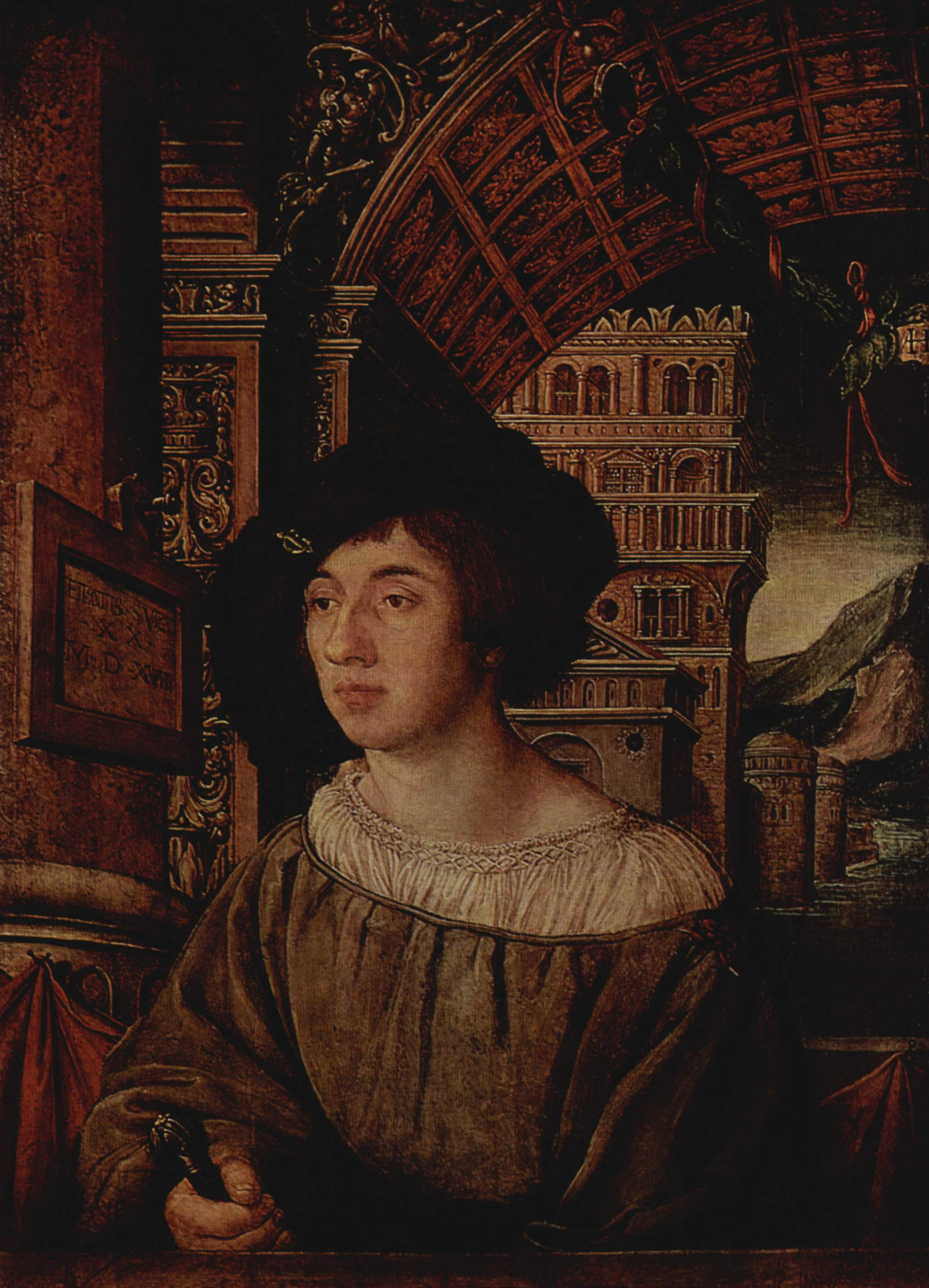
Portrait of a Young Man, 1518, oil on wood, 43 x 32 cm, Hermitage Museum, St Petersburg.

Ambrosius Holbein (c. 1494 – c. 1519) was a German and later a Swiss artist in painting, drawing, and printmaking. He was the elder brother, by about three years, of Hans Holbein the Younger, but he appears to have died in his mid-twenties, leaving behind only a small body of work.

== Biography ==
Like his younger brother, he was born in Augsburg (which today is in Bavaria, but then was a free imperial city), a center of art, culture, and trade at that time. His father Hans Holbein the Elder was a pioneer and leader in the transformation of German art from the Gothic to the Renaissance style. In his studio, both his sons, Ambrosius and Hans, received their first painting lessons as well as an introduction to the crafts of the goldsmith, jeweller, and printmaker.

The young Holbein, alongside his brother and his father, is pictured in the left-hand panel of Holbein the Elder's 1504 altarpiece triptych the Basilica of St. Paul, which is displayed at the Staatsgalerie in Augsberg.

In 1515, Ambrosius is assumed to have lived in the Swiss town of Stein am Rhein, where he helped a painter from Schaffhausen named Thomas Schmid with the murals in the main hall of the St. George monastery. The next year saw Ambrosius, as well as his brother Hans, in Basel, where he initially worked as a journeyman in Hans Herbster's studio. In 1517 he registered as a member of the Basel painters' guild, and on 6 June 1518 he was naturalized as a citizen of Basel. The goldsmith Jörg Schweiger, whom Holbein had portrayed before, was his guarantor. However, he disappears from records soon after and is assumed to have died around 1519. Franny Moyle writes, "There is no record of Ambrosius's death, but the abrupt cessation of his work in a year [1519] where so many were falling prey to sickness suggests that he either caught the disease that began with a headache, or the plague that came in its wake, and died. Another alternative is that his financial worries had pressed him into mercenary service ... though with the Italian Wars in momentary pause, this seems unlikely."

The Portrait of a Boy with Blond Hair and its companion, the Portrait of a Boy with Brown Hair, are among Ambrosius’ best works of this period. Both are now in the Basel Kunstmuseum.

Ambrosius Holbein ranks among the most important of Basel's illustrators and prominent "small format" artists.

== Works ==
Portrait of a Boy with Blond Hair, 1516, Basel

- Virgin and Child (1514; Kunstmuseum, Basel)
- Portrait of a Boy with Blond Hair (1516; Kunstmuseum, Basel)
- Portrait of a Boy with Brown Hair (1517; Basel, Kunstmuseum, Basel)
- Portrait of Jörg Schweiger (1518; Kunstmuseum, Basel)
- Portrait of a Young Man (1515; Hessisches Landesmuseum, Darmstadt)
- Nativity (1514; Fürstlich Fürstenbergische Gemäldegalerie, Donaueschingen)
- Nativity (Klerikalseminar Georgianum, Munich)
- Repose of Mary (Klerikalseminar Georgianum, Munich)
- Frontispiece to the third edition of Thomas More's Utopia, 1518
- Portrait of Johannes Xylotectus (Zimmermann) (1520; Germanisches Nationalmuseum, Nuremberg)
- Portrait of a Young Man (1518; Hermitage Museum, St. Petersburg)
- Portrait of a Young Man (often attributed to Hans Holbein the Younger) (1518; National Gallery of Art, Washington)
- Repose of Mary (Gemäldegalerie der Akademie der bildenden Künste, Vienna)

Also, Krannert Art Museum in Illinois has a painting labelled "Portrait of girl" by Ambrosius Holbein. The painting used to be a part of Austrian Imperial connection, and given the outfit of the young woman is an example of very early 16th century Spanish fashion, closely resembling tomb of Queen Juana I of Castille, it might be an unidentified portrait of her.

== See also ==
- Hans Holbein the Elder
- Hans Holbein the Younger
- Early Renaissance painting
