= Park Theatre (Philadelphia, Broad St.) =

Theatre in Pennsylvania, United States

- Empire Theatre; Salvation Army Memorial Building
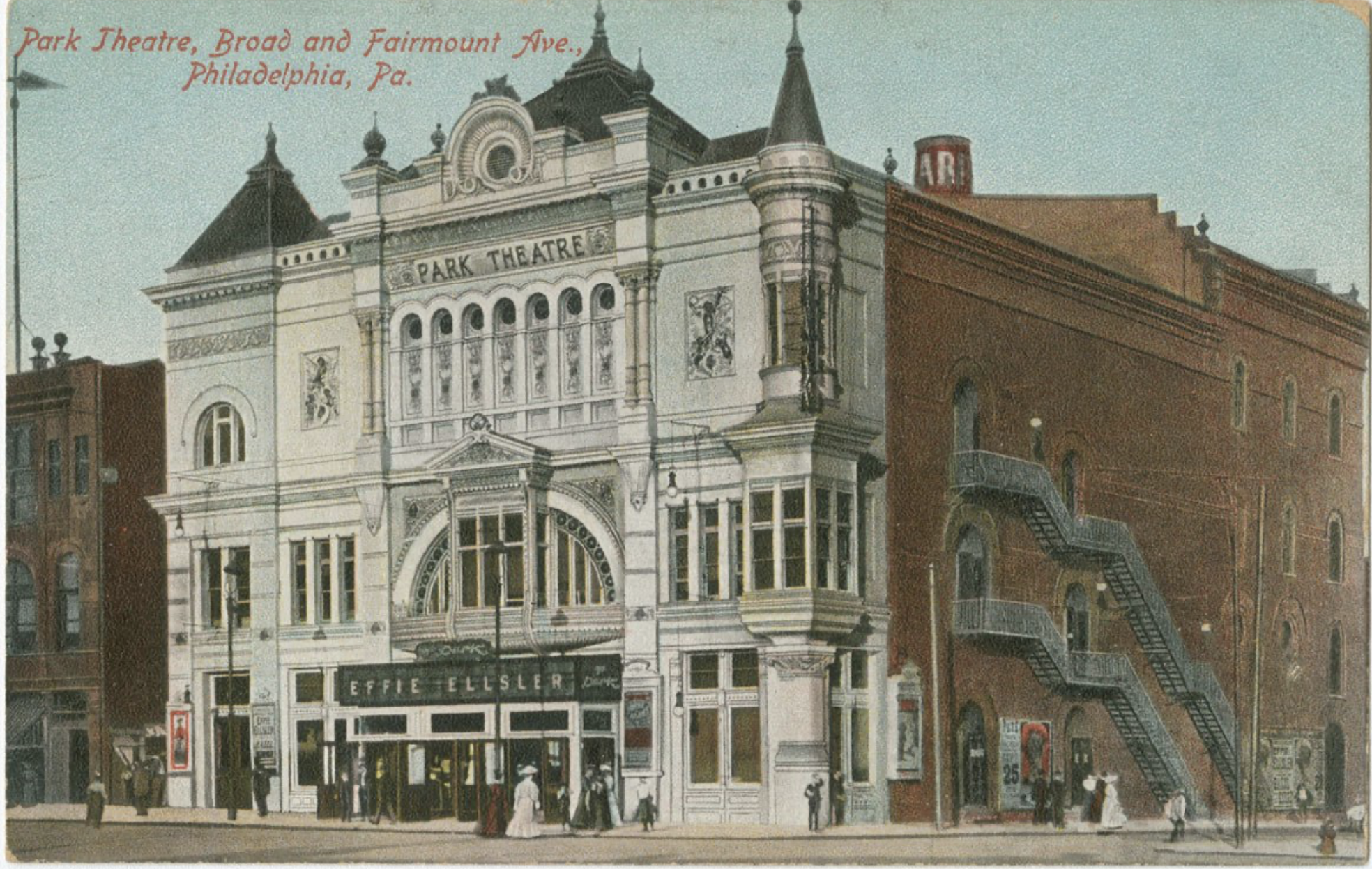
- 1910 postcard depicting the Park Theatre
- Address: 701-705 North Broad Street; Philadelphia, Pennsylvania, United States
- Coordinates: 39°58′2″N 75°9′36″W

Construction
- Opened: 1889
- Demolished: 1970
- Architects: J. B. McElfatrick; Halsey C. De Bond

Park Theatre was a theatre located in Philadelphia, Pennsylvania, United States, at 701-705 North Broad Street. Constructed in 1889, it was situated at the corner of Broad and Fairmont Ave. It opened as a legitimate theatre and later became a venue for vaudeville, minstrel shows, and stock theatre. In 1911 it became part of the Nixon theatre chain, and was renamed the Empire Theatre. It was converted into a burlesque venue that also screened silent films. In March 1915 the theatre was closed after it was sold. It was sold again at auction the following December to John Wanamaker. Wanamaker converted the building into a new headquarters for the Salvation Army, and the building reopened as the Salvation Army Memorial Building on May 13, 1917. This building had an auditorium known as Evangeline Hall. The building later became known as the Salvation Army Memorial Temple. It was demolished in March 1970, and a new Salvation Army building was constructed on the same site which was open by November 1972.

== History ==
=== Park Theatre ===
The Park Theatre (PT) was commissioned by Israel Fleishman, who was at that time manager of the Walnut Street Theatre. It was built in 1889 at the corner of North Broad Street and Fairmont Ave in what was then a rapidly developing theatre district. It was designed by architects J. B. McElfatrick and Halsey C. De Bond, and had a seating capacity of 1,694 people. It opened as a legitimate theatre on September 16, 1889 with a performance of George H. Jessop's 22, Second Floor starring Annie Pixley, John T. Burke, and M. C. Daly. The theatre was originally managed by Frank C. Howe Jr who worked for Fleishman.

In late October and early November 1889 the James W. Morrissey's English Grand Opera Company presented Bizet's Carmen, Verdi's Il trovatore, Balfe's The Bohemian Girl, and Gounod's Faust at the PT. On September 15, 1890, the PT presented the world premiere of William Gill and Robert Frazer's Hendrik Hudson starring Fay Templeton in the title role. Some of the other productions presented at the theatre in its early years included Fred Marsden's Zaza (1889), Bolossy Kiralfy's ballet Antiope (1889), Augustin Daly's The Lottery of Love (1889), Scott Marble's Said Pascha (1889), Daniel Frohman's version of The Prince and the Pauper (1890), Shakespeare's Twelfth Night (1890, starring Marie Wainwright as Viola), Hermann Sudermann's Honour (1890, performed in German as Die Erde), William Gill's Adonis (1891, with Henry E. Dixey), Edward Jakobowski's Erminie (1891, with Pauline Hall), and Victorien Sardou's Odette (1891, with Clara Morris).

Rosina Vokes's starred in a triple bill of plays at the PT in January 1892, performing in the one-act plays A Game of Cards, My Milliner's Bill, and The Rough Diamond. The following month Harry Paulton's Niobe was performed at the theatre with a cast led by Isabelle Coe. This was followed by productions of A Night at the Circus (1892, with Nellie McHenry), A Straight Tip (1892, with James T. Powers), Steele MacKaye's Hazel Kirke (1892, with Effie Ellsler), Charles Thomas's The Paper Chase (1893), Augustus Thomas's Surrender (1893, with Louis Aldrich), Reginald De Koven's The Algerian (1893, with Marie Tempest) De Koven's The Fencing Master (1894, with Laura Mapleson), and William Lestocq and Harry Nicholls's Jane (1894, with Jennie Yeamans). On October 15, 1894, the musical Palmer Cox's Brownies had its premiere at the PT with a cast that included Alice Johnson as Prince Florimel. It was a tremendously popular show that toured widely in the United States for years.

The PT eventually ceased operating as a legitimate theatre and became a venue for vaudeville, minstrel shows, and traveling stock theatre companies.

=== Empire Theatre ===
In August 1911 the Empire Amusement Company purchased the PT, and rebranded it the Empire Theatre (ET). This organization was in partnership with the Nixon Zimmerman Amusement Company, and it became a part of the Nixon theatre chain. It was converted into an American burlesque venue. The newly branded venue re-opened on August 19, 1911, with The Big Review, a show with a cast of 70 headlined by Frankie Heath. This was followed by the burletta Miss New York, Jr. (1911), the musical comedy Daffydills (1911), and Tom Miner's Bohemian Burlesquers (1912). In April 1912 the Corse Payton Stock Company was in residence at the theatre. The following month the theatre began screening silent films alongside live vaudeville shows. In the autumn of 1912 two "musical travesties" were on the bill at the ET: Honeymoon Inn and Cafe Bergere.

In April 1913 Beatrice Forbes-Robertson Hale gave a lecture on suffrage at the ET in which she criticized the militant methods employed by Emmeline Pankhurst and her collaborators in the British suffragette movement. Instead, she advocated for a non-violent movement in the United States. Soon after, the theatre underwent renovations to improve fire safety measures as well as cosmetic upgrades. It re-opened in August 1913 with the Bob Manchester's burlesque Cracker Jacks. In January 1914 The Queen of Bohemia was staged at the ET with a cast led by Mollie Williams. Later that year the ET staged the burlesque My Wife's Husband with a cast led by comedian Bert Baker and soubrette Babe La Tour.

=== Salvation Army Memorial Building ===
The ET was sold in March 1915, and it ceased offering entertainments at that time. It was sold again the following December at auction to a William L. Nevin who was acting on behalf of an undisclosed third party. It was later revealed that John Wanamaker was the purchaser, and he converted the theatre into a new headquarters for the Salvation Army (SA). The re-made building, known as the Salvation Army Memorial Building (SAMB), contained an auditorium that was christened Evangeline Hall. The new headquarters opened in May 1917 and was officially dedicated in a ceremony on May 13, 1917. The SA later purchased the building from Wanamaker at a bargain price in January 1918 but with a formal contract guaranteeing that if the building were to no longer be used for the purposes originally intended, that ownership would change to the Young Men's Christian Association.

Newspaper articles referred to the building as the Salvation Army Memorial Temple as early as 1936. It continued to be used by the SA until 1970 when funds for a new building were provided by Philadelphia's Redevelopment Authority as part of the Poplar Renewal Area project. Demolition of the building began on March 12, 1970, with plans to construct a new building for the SA at the same location. By November 1972 the new Salvation Army building at 701 N. Broad St. was open to the public and operating a prison parole assistance program with a caseload of 200 men.
