= Jane (1915 film) =

1915 film by Frank Lloyd

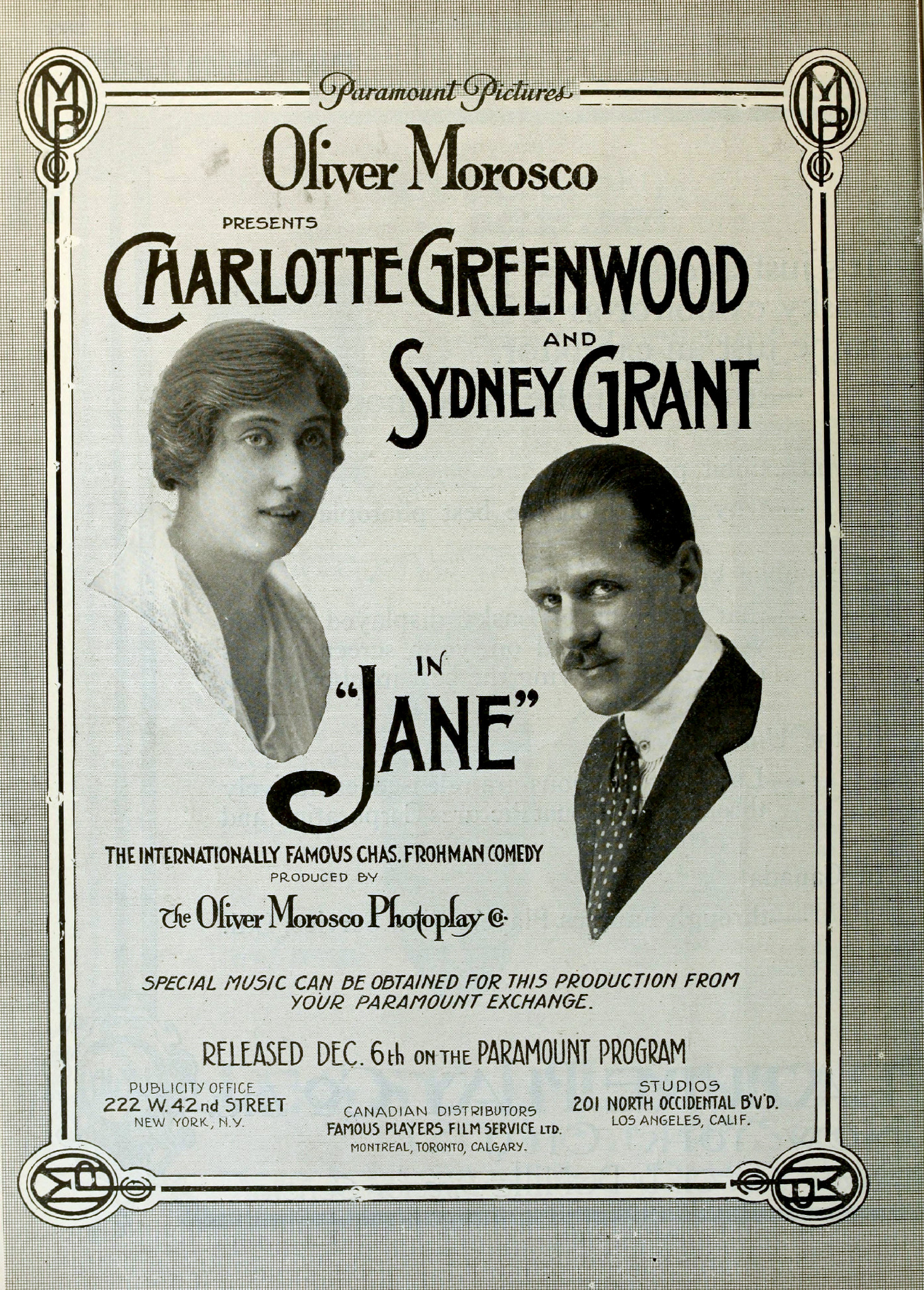
- Promotion in Moving Picture World, 1915
- Directed by: Frank Lloyd
- Written by: W.H. Lestocq(play); Harry Nicholls(play); Elliott J. Clawson; Frank Lloyd
- Produced by: Oliver Morosco
- Starring: Charlotte Greenwood; Sydney Grant
- Music by: George W. Beynon
- Distributed by: Paramount Pictures
- Release date: December 6, 1915
- Running time: 5 reels
- Country: United States
- Language: Silent film(English intertitles)

Jane is a 1915 American silent film produced by the Oliver Morosco company and distributed by Paramount Pictures. It is based on the stage play Jane by W.H. Lestocq and Harry Nicholls. Frank Lloyd directed, early in his career, and up-and-coming stage comic Charlotte Greenwood debuts and stars in her first motion picture. This was Lloyd's second directed feature film after several years of making shorts. This film survives in the Library of Congress.

== Cast ==
- Charlotte Greenwood - Jane
- Sydney Grant - William Tipson
- Myrtle Stedman - Lucy Norton
- Forrest Stanley - Charles Shackleton
- Howard Davies - Colonel Norton
- Herbert Standing - Andrew Kershaw
- Lydia Yeamans Titus - Mrs. Chadwick
- Syd de Grey - Henry Jardine
