= Palmer Cox's Brownies =

Palmer Cox's Brownies is a musical in three acts with a libretto by Palmer Cox and music by Malcolm Douglas. It is based on Cox's children's literature series The Brownies. It was given its premiere at the Park Theatre in Philadelphia, Pennsylvania on October 15, 1894. The show transferred to the Fourteenth Street Theatre in Manhattan where it opened on November 12, 1894. It ran there for 96 performances. The production was produced by Klaw and Erlanger, directed by Ben Teal, choreographed by Carl Marwig, and used sets by Charles Getz and J. W. Sommer.

After the close of the Broadway run, a national tour of Palmer Cox's Brownies began in Trenton, New Jersey in October 1895. Robert Cummings performed the part of the villain demon Dragonfel in the touring cast. The show traveled during the 1895-1896 and 1896-1897 seasons to theaters in Pennsylvania, Washington D.C., Illinois, Missouri, Kentucky, Ohio, Michigan, Minnesota, Wisconsin, New York, Massachusetts, Connecticut, Utah, Tennessee, California, Kansas, Iowa, Nebraska, and Georgia. The tour continued to run after this, closing after nearly five years on the road.

== Original cast ==
=== Brownies ===
- Charles Drew as King Stanislaus
- Alice Johnson as Prince Florimel
- Eugene Sanger as J. Chappie Goodform
- Grace Hamilton as Count Ronaldo
- Charles Hagan as Inspector Clubben
- Fred R. Runnells as Tom Binnacle
- A. W. Maflin as Reginald Mortarboard
- Wallis Clark as Krout von Bismarck
- Willis Pickert as Sam Doodledoo
- Stephen Ferguson as Paddy Whacker
- Sydney Grant as Li Lo
- Whippler Twins as The Brownie Twins
- Tom Collins as Ratovsky

=== Fae ===
- Marie Louise Day as Queen Titania
- Maude Thompson as Dame Brusilda
- Ida Mulle as Daffodil
- Louise Endicott as Violet
- Florence Thornton as Mignonette
- Georgie Denin as Jasmine

=== Demons ===
- George L. Broderick as Dragonfel
- Frank Soule as Mangleplot
- H. B. Meiggs as Beetlebore
- Frank Simons as Fatalfoe
- William Brown as Mandrake
- W. A. Kilrain as Woolfinger
- Joseph W. Smiley as Grouthead
- A. Seigrist as Boundingboor

=== Gods ===
- W. A. Krone as Neptune
- Lee Lamar as Euphrosyne

== Plot ==
Prince Florimel is the adopted son of King Stanislaus who rules the Brownie band. Florimel is betrothed to Titania, Queen of the Fairies. Their wedding is attended by the fae and the Brownies who genuinely wish the couple happiness. The wedding is also attended by the evil head demon Dragonfel and his lesser demon companions who are in disguise and secretly plot against the Florimel and his bride. Titania and her ladies in waiting are kidnapped by the demons, and are taken to Dragonfel's castle on a far off enchanted island. The Brownies build a boat and pursue, but are caught in a terrible storm. They are saved by the goddess Euphrosyne who summons Neptune to calm the seas.

The Brownies finish their journey to the island on an airship, but upon arriving at the castle in the night time they are confronted by a fire breathing dragon. The Brownies defeat the dragon and enter the castle, managing to hide from the armed guards. King Stanislaus and his men disguise themselves to gain admittance into Dragonfel's court. They attack Dragongel, but just as he is about to be defeated, he summons Vulcan who brings forth an earthquake that brings the castle down upon everyone and causes a volcano to rise up out of the earth. Erupting lava that threatens to destroy the Brownies, while Dragonfel escapes to his mines with Titania still his captive. Florimel prays to Euphrosyne and she saves the Brownies once again. The Brownies give thanksgiving for the rescue.

The coming of the sun weakens the Brownies, as their magic is only powerful at night. In their weakened state, they are captured by the demons and enslaved to work in Dragonfel's mines. The Russian Brownie has a hidden stick dynamite, and he uses it to explode rock down upon Dragonfel. Meanwhile Euphrosyne aids in rescuing Titania and her fae maidens, and brings a humbled Dragonfel to a place of repentance. Florimel and Titania are reunited and all return happily to Brownie-land.
