= Effie F. Kamman =

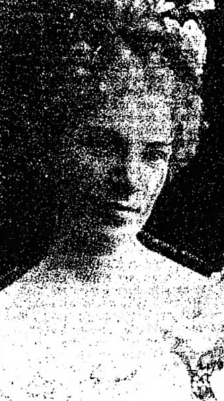
- Effie F. Kamman, from an 1898 newspaper
- Born: 1868
- Died: 1933 (aged 64–65)
- Other names: E. F. Kamman
- Occupations: composer, performer

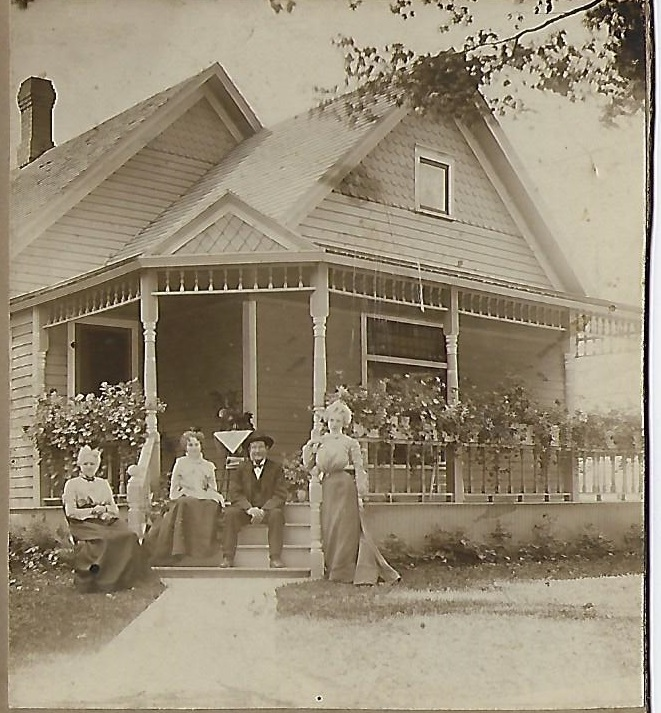
Effie Kamman (Standing) with her parents and sister. Father Fred sitting, Mother at far left, sister Ida seated middle. Taken at Fred Kammans home, 110 Main Street, Wayne Michigan. Ca. 1898.

Effie F. Kamman (1868–1933) was an American composer, pianist, music teacher, and vaudeville performer. She was known for composing "The Dance of the Brownies" (1893), a popular tune inspired by the children's books by Palmer Cox.

== Early life ==
Effie F. Kamman was from Detroit, the daughter of Frederick Kamman and Minerva A. Howlett Kamman. Her father was a butcher.

== Career ==
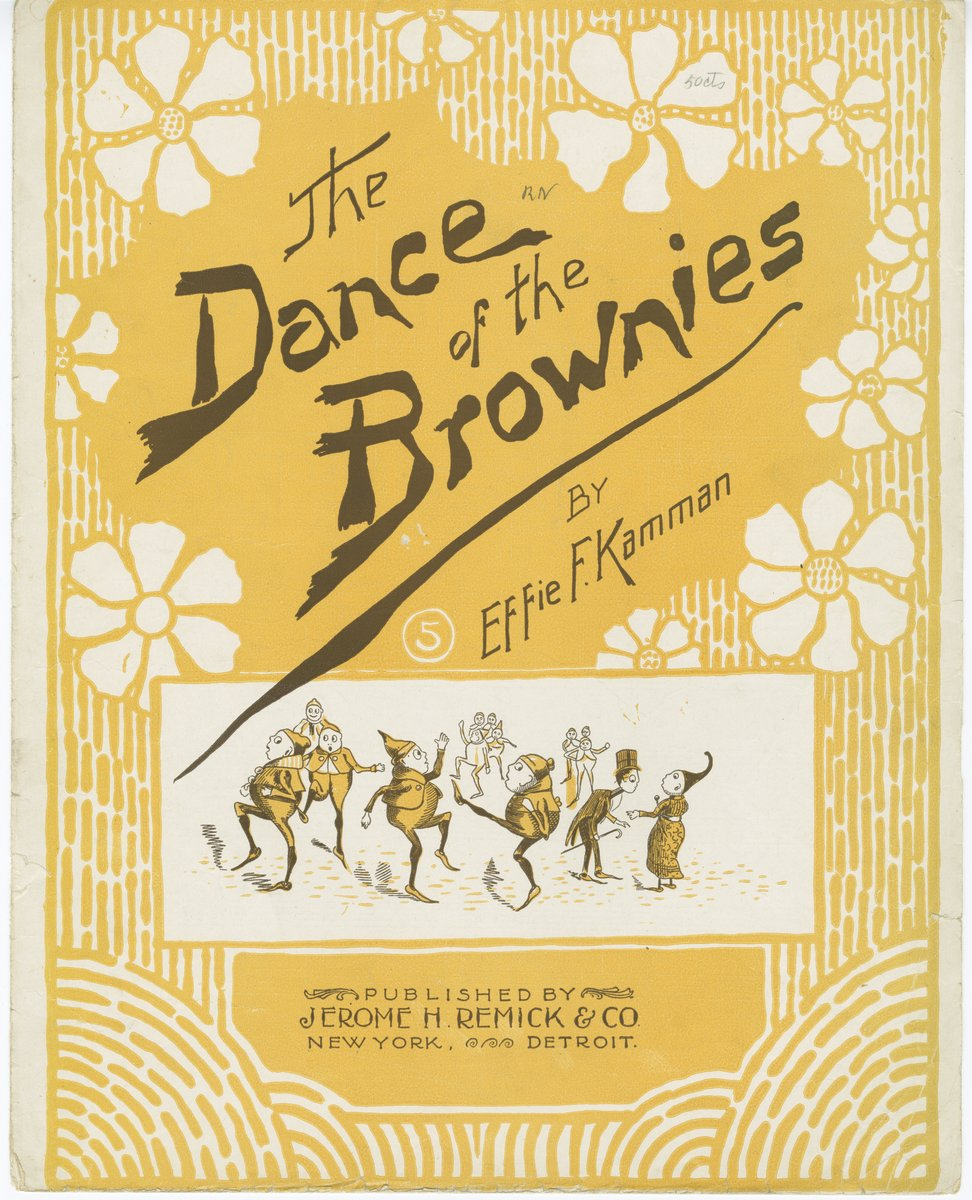
Sheet music for Kamman's "The Dance of the Brownies" (1895 edition), published by Jerome H. Remick & Co.

Kamman was a music teacher in Detroit, who also gained notice as a performer in vaudeville. She toured in several shows, including The Fencing Master (1894), Run on the Bank (1895), The Governors (1897), Hunting for Hawkins (1901), and On the Stroke of 12 (1903). She sang soprano parts, but also sometimes toured as a "lady baritone" novelty singing act. She was also the music and art editor for the newspaper Detroit Journal. Later in her career, she played piano on radio, and in theatres during silent films.

Published works by Kamman included

- "The Dance of the Brownies" (1893)
- "The American Two-Step" (1895)
- "Clover" (1898),
- "Darktown Doings" (1898)
- "Dance of the White Rats" (1901)
- "Hunting for Hawkins" (1901)
- "I Love You Yet" (1903)
- "Skirmish" (1903),
- "What's Your Hurry?" (1922)
- "The Old Fashioned Love of the Days Long Ago" (1928)
- "In Twilight Land" (1928)

== Personal life ==
Effie F. Kamman lived in Los Angeles, California, for several years, until shortly before her death. She died in 1933, aged 64 years, in Detroit. Her gravesite is with her parents' and her sister's, in Michigan.
