= Jane (Lestocq) =

Farce by William Lestocq and Harry Nicholls

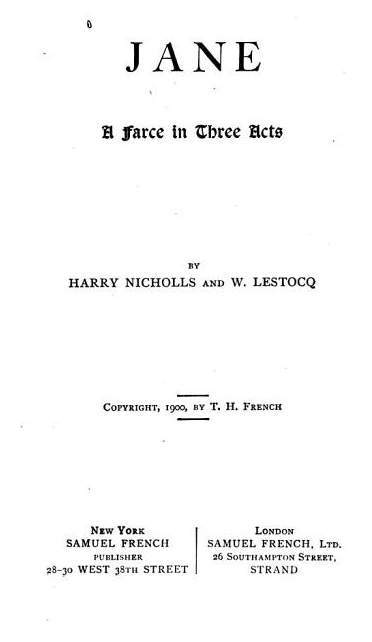
- Original language: English
- Written by: William Lestocq and Harry Nicholls
- Based on: "Timson's Little Holiday" by Harry Nicholls
- Genre: Farce
- Setting: England, Present Day

Premiere
- Date: 1890
- Place: Comedy Theatre, London

Jane is a farce written by William Lestocq and Harry Nicholls. It premiered in 1890 at the Comedy Theatre in London, directed by Sir Charles Hawtrey, who also played the role of Charley Shackleton. Lottie Venne starred as the titular character.

The play was adapted from Nicholls's one-act farce, Timson's Little Holiday, which premiered in 1882.

== Plot ==
1908 photograph of The Sock and Buskin players in Jane

William Tipson, a servant, wants to settle down with his fellow servant, Jane, to whom he is secretly married, but the pair do not yet have the means to do so; they must work one more day for their employer, Charley Shackleton, in order to gain enough money to support themselves with a store. Meanwhile, Shackleton has continually squandered the money he has received from his trustee, Mr. Kershaw. Consequently, Mr. Kershaw decided to stop supporting Charley- until he responded to Mr. Kershaw's letter with the excuse that it is not he who is a spendthrift; it is his wife, who will not listen to reason. Mr. Kershaw has now decided to visit Shackleton and talk to his wife. Unfortunately, Shackleton does not have a wife; this is why he plans to have Jane disguise herself in that role. Jane agrees to go along with the plan, as she and William need the money.

Mr. Kershaw visits Shackleton's home, and Jane pretends to be Shackleton's spoiled, pompous wife. In the meantime, Mrs. Pixon, Jane's cousin, decides to temporarily deposit their baby in the care of Jane and William. As Jane is pretending that the baby belongs to her and Shackleton, Mrs. Pixon arrives and, convinced that Jane is trying to kidnap her child, demands that Jane give him back to her. Mrs. Pixon leaves with the intention of returning with her husband. William eventually confesses everything to Mr. Kershaw. Mrs. Pixon appears with the diminutive Mr. Pixon, and they depart with their child. Mr. Kershaw ultimately decides to continue supporting Shackleton on the condition that he marries as soon as possible, and all is well.

== Reception ==
While the original production was generally well received, The Era's review condemned the farce as immoral.

== Revivals ==
In 1892, the play was revived at Macauley's Theatre, Louisville, Kentucky, with Elaine Ellison as Jane. It was produced in 1894 by Frohman's Company No. 13 at the Lansing Theatre, Lincoln, Nebraska.

In 1908, the all-male Sock and Buskin players performed the play at the Providence Opera House in Providence, Rhode Island. A 1922 staging ran at the Williston Theatre, Northampton, Massachusetts. The Toc H organisation toured the play from November 1926, beginning at St John's Hall, Lambeth, and ending in June 1927 at Park Theatre, Hanwell.

== Adaptations ==
In 1915, the play was adapted into a film of the same name, starring Charlotte Greenwood as Jane, Sydney Grant as William Tipson, and Forrest Stanley as Shackleton. The 1919 musical Baby Bunting is an adaptation of Jane.

== Bibliography ==
- Dyson, Clark Ellen. (1922). An Author Index of French's Acting Drama. Google Books.
