= Sibyl Sanderson =

American operatic soprano (1864–1903)

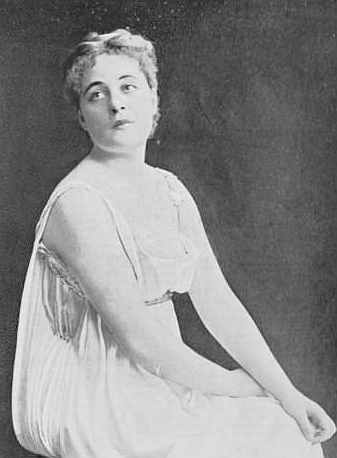
Sibyl Sanderson

Sibyl Swift Sanderson (December 7, 1864 – May 16, 1903) was a famous American operatic dramatic coloratura soprano during the Parisian Belle Époque.

== Biography ==
Sibyl Swift Sanderson was born in Sacramento, California, on December 7, 1864. (Note: Many standard reference works say she was born on December 7, 1865; including Grove Music Online, the Grosses Sängerlexikon, Baker's Dictionary of Opera, and The Concise Oxford Dictionary of Opera. However, her biographer, Jack Winsor Hansen, dates her birth to December 7, 1864.) Sibyl's father Silas Sanderson was a California politician and lawyer; after serving as Chief Justice of the Supreme Court of California, he became a highly paid legal advisor to the Southern Pacific Railroad. After his death in 1886, she and her mother and sisters moved back to Paris and became transplanted socialites.

Sanderson proved to be a remarkably gifted singer and began to appear on the stages of the Opéra-Comique, and later Opéra, in Paris, most notably in the works of Jules Massenet. She was his favorite soprano and appeared in the premieres of a number of his operas, the roles having been created for her unique talents. (Her professional debut took place in Paris in the title role in Esclarmonde.) She was also a famous interpreter of Manon, Massenet's most enduring opera.

Sanderson was also admired by Camille Saint-Saëns, who wrote the title role in Phryné for her. Success outside of Paris was elusive for Sanderson; she appeared at Covent Garden and the Metropolitan Opera (debut in title role of Manon on January 16, 1895, the last performance as Juliette in Roméo et Juliette on December 31, 1901) to lackluster reviews.

In 1897 she married a Cuban millionaire and sugar heir Antonio E. Terry (d. 1899), after which she temporarily halted her operatic activity, making an unsuccessful comeback two years later.

Her last years were marred by depression, alcoholism and illness and she died in Paris of a malignant influenza (pneumonia), at the age of 38 on May 16, 1903. (Note: Most standard reference works report she died May 15, 1903; including Grove Music Online, the Grosses Sängerlexikon, Baker's Dictionary of Opera, and The Concise Oxford Dictionary of Opera. However, her biographer, Jack Winsor Hansen, dates her death to roughly 4:00 AM on May 16, 1903. This matches reporting on her death in The New York Times.)

Sanderson was responsible for helping launch the career of another soprano made famous in the French repertoire, Mary Garden.

Sibyl Sanderson as Massenet's Esclarmonde

== Roles created for Sanderson ==
- The title role in Esclarmonde by Massenet, on May 14, 1889
- The title role in Phryné by Saint-Saëns on May 24, 1893
- The title role in Thaïs by Massenet on March 16, 1894

== See also ==
- Laura Schirmer Mapleson

== Notes and references ==
=== Bibliography ===
- Hansen, Jack Winsor (2004). The Sibyl Sanderson Story: Requiem For A Diva. Portland, OR: Cambridge: Amadeus Press. ISBN 1-57467-094-8.
- Kuhn, Laura (2000). "Sanderson, Sibyl". Baker's Dictionary of Opera. Schirmer Books. ISBN 0028653491.
- Kutsch, K.-J.; Riemens, Leo (2003). "Sanderson, Sibyl". In Rost, Hansjörg (ed.). Grosses Sängerlexikon. K. G. Saur Verlag. ISBN 978-3-598-44088-5.
- Warrack, John; West, Ewan (1996). The Concise Oxford Dictionary of Opera, Third Edition. Oxford University Press. ISBN 978-0-19-280028-2.
