= Palmer Cox =

Canadian illustrator and author

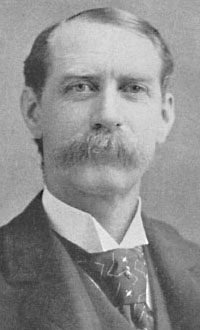
- Born: April 28, 1840; Granby, Quebec, Canada
- Died: July 24, 1924 (aged 84); Granby, Quebec, Canada
- Occupations: Illustrator, author, poet
- Writing career
- Notable work: The Brownies

Palmer Cox (April 28, 1840 – July 24, 1924) was a Canadian illustrator and author, best known for The Brownies, his series of humorous verse books and comic strips about the mischievous but kindhearted fairy-like sprites. The cartoons were published in several books, such as The Brownies, Their Book (1887). Due to the popularity of Cox's Brownies, one of the first popular handheld cameras was named after them, the Eastman Kodak Brownie camera.

== Life ==
He was born in Granby, Quebec, the son of Michael and Sarah (Miller) Cox, and became a carpenter and car builder. He moved to San Francisco via Panama as a railroad contractor, and he lived there from 1863 to 1875. In 1874, he began to formally study drawing and contribute illustrated stories to such publications as Golden Era and Alta California. After 1875, Cox lived in New York (Pine View House, East Quogue, Long Island). During this time he regularly contributed editorial cartoons to Oscar Hammerstein's United States Tobacco Journal.

The earliest publication of Brownie characters took place in 1879, but not until the February 1881 issue of Wide Awake magazine were the creatures printed in their final form. In 1883, Brownie stories appeared in St. Nicholas Magazine and as their popularity rose, they were covered in publications such as the Ladies' Home Journal.

Cox's Brownies were little men who had mischievous adventures together. Each Brownie had a distinctive physical appearance: Cholly Boutonnière wore a top hat and monocle, while others wore traditional Turkish, Irish, German, Swedish, Russian, and Chinese garb. There was an Eskimo, an American Indian, even an Uncle Sam. "Much of the success of his books can be attributed to his treatment of the characters, who portray human nature with its goodness and strength and also its follies, but never its baseness.".

"As Cox developed his own Brownies, he retained characteristics found in the brownies of folklore, but he made notable changes. Whereas the Scottish brownie is usually a solitary being who remains in one household performing his domestic chores or field work, Cox's Brownies are gregarious, always banding together and moving from place for their frolics and deeds of kindness."

"The legendary brownie of Scotland ... in Cox's words, was good natured and harmless, never injuring anyone or doing any damage, and it was thought a very fortunate thing to have a Brownie about the house. No one could see the Brownie, only those gifted with second sight...Cox believed that brownies were so named because of their brown hair and weather-beaten countenances."

Cox died at his 17-room dream home named Brownie Castle at Granby, Quebec, July 24, 1924. His headstone has a Brownie figure and the inscription: In creating the Brownies he bestowed a priceless heritage on childhood.

== Homages in other works ==
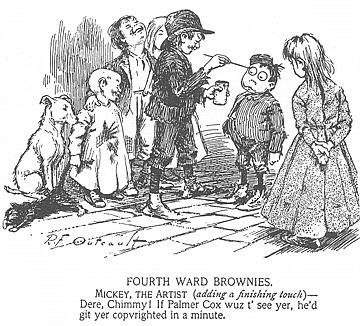

- Detroit composer Effie F. Kamman wrote "The Dance of the Brownies" (1893), inspired by the Cox characters. It was a popular hit.
- Richard F. Outcault referenced Cox and The Brownies (whom he parodied) in a February 9, 1895 cartoon of Hogan's Alley.
- In the 1943 children's novel Rufus M., by Eleanor Estes set during World War I, young Rufus Moffat and his older sister Jane have a contest involving Palmer Cox's Brownie books: each new illustration, they compete to see who first spots the Brownie in the top hat.
- The idea of the character of Dunno (Russian: Незнайка, Neznayka that is Don'tknowka) created by Soviet children's writer Nikolay Nosov comes from the books of Palmer Cox.

== Bibliography ==
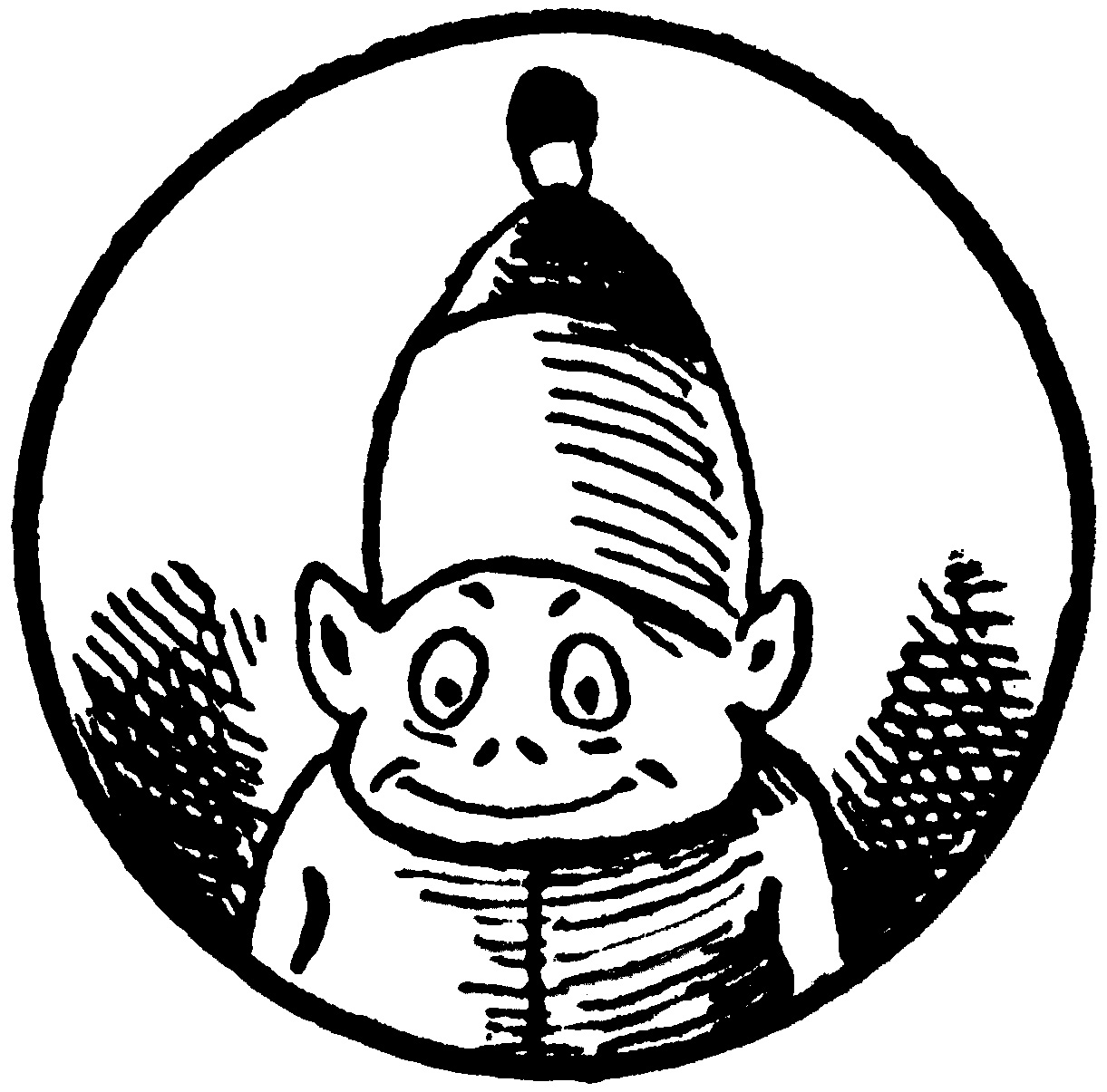
A Cox Brownie

- Squibs of California (1874) Later republished as Comic Yarns (1887)
- Hans Von Petter's Trip to Gotham (1878)
- How Columbus Found America (1878)
- That Stanley (1878)
- Queer People, such as Goblins, Giants, Merry Men and Monarchs (1888)
- Queer People with Paws and Claws (1888)
- Queer People with Wings and Stings (1888)
- The Brownies, Their Book (1887)
- Another Brownie Book (1890)
- The Brownies at Home (1893)
- The Brownies Around the World (1894)
- The Brownies in Fairyland (1894)
- The Brownies Through the Union (1895)
- Frontier Humor (1895)
- The Brownies Abroad (1899)
- The Brownies in the Philippines
- The Monk's Victory and other Stories by Palmer Cox (1903)
- The Palmer Cox Brownie Primer (1906)
- The Brownie Clown in Brownie Town (comics 1907)
- The Brownies Many More Nights (1913)
- The Brownies and Prince Florimel (1918)
- The Brownie Calendar
- Palmer Cox's Brownies (1894, musical with a libretto by Cox and music by Malcolm Douglas)
- The Brownies in Fairyland (lyrics 1925)
