= The Doughgirls (play) =

Play by Joseph Fields

- Playbill cover for The Doughgirls on Broadway
- Original language: English
- Written by: Joseph Fields
- Genre: Comedy
- Setting: A hotel in Washington, D.C.

Premiere
- Date: December 30, 1942
- Place: Lyceum Theatre

The Doughgirls is a three-act play written by Joseph Fields. Producer Max Gordon staged it on Broadway, where it debuted at the Lyceum Theatre on December 30, 1942. The play is a comedy about three unmarried women sharing a room in an overcrowded hotel in Washington, D.C. during World War II. The Broadway production was a hit that ran for 671 performances and closed on July 29, 1944. It was adapted as a film of the same name in 1944.

== Cast and characters ==
The characters and cast from the Broadway production are given below:

Opening night cast
Character	Broadway cast
Edna	Virginia Field
Julian Cadman	King Calder
Mr. Jordan	Sydney Grant
Col. Harry Hallstead	Reed Brown, Jr.
A bellboy	George Calvert
Maid	Mary Cooper
Maid	Mildred Haines
Vivian	Arleen Whelan
Another bellboy	Jerome Thor
A porter	Hugh Williamson
Another porter	Kermit Kegley
Waiter	Walter Beck
Nan	Doris Nolan
Brigadier General Slade	William J. Kelly
Tom Dillon	Vinton Hayworth
Judge Honoria Blake	Ethel Wilson
Natalia Chodorov	Arlene Francis
A stranger	Harold Grau
Orderly	Joseph Olney
Warren Buckley	Edward H. Robins
Sylvia	Natalie Schafer
Chaplain Stevens	Reynolds Evans
Admiral Owens	Thomas F. Tracey
Timothy Walsh	James MacDonald
Stephen Forbes	Maurice Burke
Father Nicholai	Maxim Panteleieff

== Film adaptation ==
Warner Bros. paid $250,000 for the right to adapt the play as a movie. James V. Kern and Sam Hellman wrote the screenplay, which had to remove the play's implications of extramarital sex to be accepted by the censors at the Breen Office. Kern directed the film, which was titled The Doughgirls.
