= The Doughgirls =

1944 film by James V. Kern

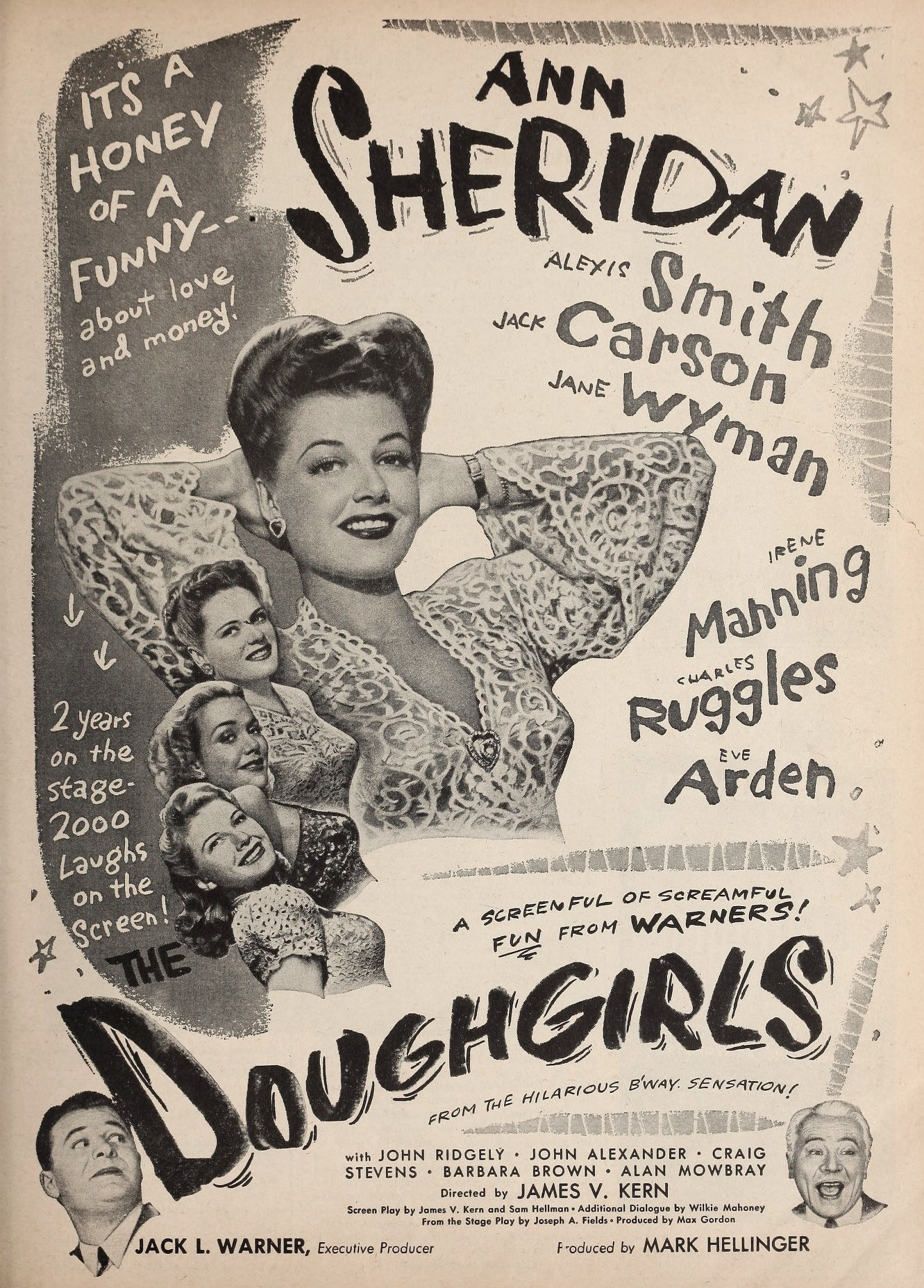
- Directed by: James V. Kern
- Screenplay by: James V. Kern; Sam Hellman
- Based on: The Doughgirls; 1942 play by Joseph Fields
- Produced by: Mark Hellinger
- Starring: Ann Sheridan; Alexis Smith; Jack Carson; Jane Wyman
- Cinematography: Ernest Haller
- Edited by: Folmar Blangsted
- Music by: Adolph Deutsch
- Distributed by: Warner Bros. Pictures
- Release date: November 25, 1944
- Running time: 102 minutes
- Country: United States
- Language: English

The Doughgirls is a 1944 American comedy film directed by James V. Kern based on the 1942 hit Broadway play written by Joseph Fields. The film works around three newlywed couples, focusing on the Halstead couple, played by Jane Wyman and Jack Carson, and their misadventures trying to find some privacy and living space in the housing shortage of WWII era Washington, D.C. Eve Arden as a Russian sniper and Joe DeRita as a sleepy hotel guest, both looking for edge in the overcrowded hotel.

The Doughgirls is based on a stage play of the same name, written in 1942 by Joseph Fields.

== Plot ==
The newly-wed Halsteads, Arthur and Vivian, upon their arrival at their overcrowded D.C. hotel, set out for the honeymoon suite, only to find it usurped by the previous newlywed couple, the Cadmans, Julian and Edna. Finally, a third newlywed couple, the Dillons, Tom and Nan, arrive to claim the suite as well. Add to this a military contractor with a no nonsense attitude; a lecherous boss; an FBI investigator; a judge (to make one couple's marriage "legal"); a group of orphan babies; a Russian who likes to shoot pigeons; and a wandering man trying to find somewhere, anywhere, to get some sleep.

== Cast ==
- Ann Sheridan as Edna Stokes Cadman
- Alexis Smith as Nan Curtiss Dillon
- Jack Carson as Arthur Halstead
- Jane Wyman as Vivian Marsden Halstead
- Irene Manning as Mrs. Sylvia Cadman
- Charles Ruggles as Stanley Slade
- Eve Arden as Sgt. Natalia Moskoroff
- John Ridgely as Julian Cadman
- Alan Mowbray as Breckenridge Drake
- John Alexander as Warren Buckley
- Craig Stevens as Lt. Tom Dillon
- Barbara Brown as Elizabeth Brush Cartwright
- Francis Pierlot as Mr. Jordan
- Donald MacBride as Judge Franklin
- Regis Toomey as Agent Walsh
- Joe DeRita as The Stranger (uncredited)
- Marie De Becker as Maid (uncredited)

== Production ==
Warner Bros. bought the rights for The Doughgirls stage play for $250,000 but still needed a script and a way to get the story of three unmarried couples in the same hotel suite around the censors, known as the Breen office, onto the screen. The studio employed James V. Kern and Sam Hellman to adapt Fields' play; marrying the couples off and toning down the language. They added jokes to address overcrowding in Washington, D.C., using wartime references such as rationing and meatless Tuesdays, while putting in a White House visit for the Dillons to meet the Roosevelts off camera.

Jane Wyman, though not pleased with fourth billing nor the "ditsy" role, was happy with the cast and to be working. Ann Sheridan was nearly suspended over The Doughgirls when Warner Bros. refused to let her out of filming, but she used her star status and negotiated a USO tour following completion, something she had wanted for some time.

== Reception ==
Daniel Bubbeo in The Women of Warner Brothers described The Doughgirls as "a raucous farce where the humor comes from the unconsummated marriage of Wyman and Carson, with a great performance by Eve Arden as a visiting Russian."

The New York Times reviewed it saying it is "distilled from the play" and "at times the dialog twirls into nonsense being saved only by the performance of the players."

== See also ==
- List of American films of 1944
