= So Long Letty (1929 film) =

1929 film

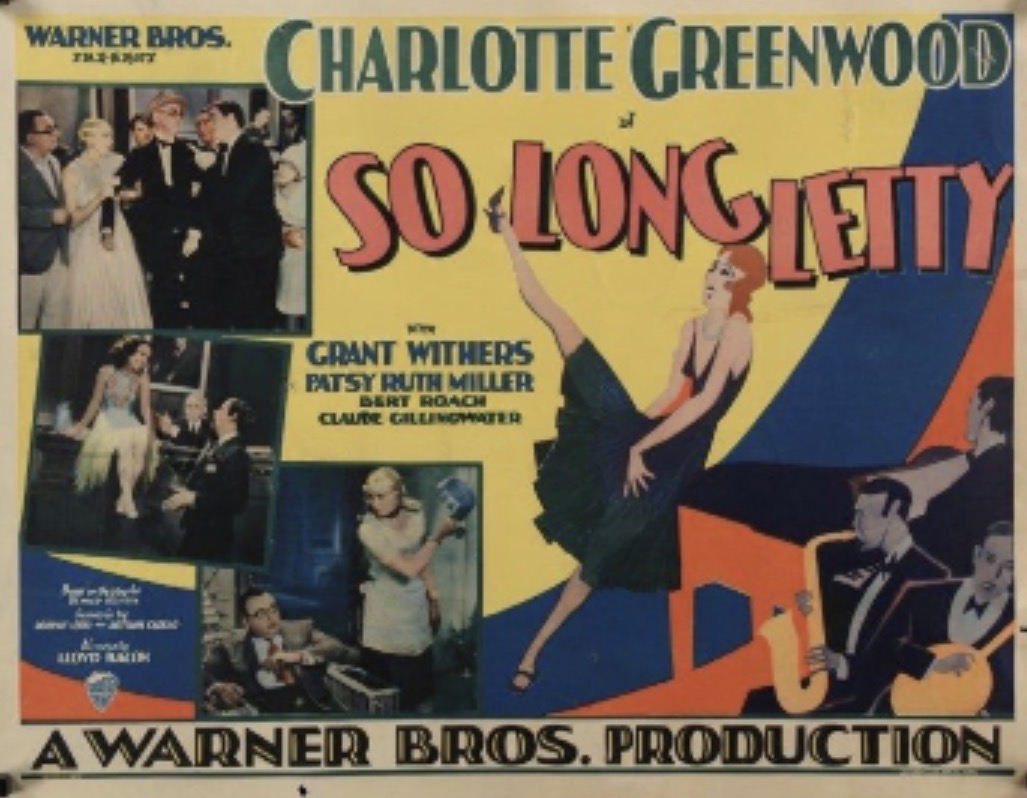
- Lobby Card
- Directed by: Lloyd Bacon
- Written by: Robert Lord; Arthur Caesar (dialogue); De Leon Anthony (titles)
- Based on: So Long Letty (1916 stage musical); Book: Oliver Morosco; Elmer Harris; Music and Lyrics: Earl Carroll
- Starring: Charlotte Greenwood
- Cinematography: James Van Trees
- Edited by: Jack Killifer
- Music by: Louis Silvers; Grant Clarke; Peter DeRose; Charles Tobias; Sidney Clare; Earl Carroll; Harry Akst
- Production company: Warner Bros. Pictures
- Distributed by: Warner Bros. Pictures
- Release date: October 16, 1929
- Running time: 64 minutes
- Country: United States
- Language: English

Full film

So Long Letty is a 1929 American sound (All-Talking) pre-Code musical comedy film directed by Lloyd Bacon and starring Charlotte Greenwood, reprising her role from the 1916 Broadway stage play. The story had previously been filmed as a silent under the same title in 1920 with Colleen Moore.

== Plot ==
Uncle Claude comes to the Ardmore Beach Hotel to see Tommy and his wife. At the hotel, with his two granddaughters Ruth and Sally, Uncle Claude meets a wise-talking employee named Letty, which causes him to leave the hotel. When he finds Tommy, he mistakes Grace for his wife and likes her and the way she keeps a clean house. To get a big check from Uncle Claude and to see how life is with the other, the two couples switch spouses for a week.

== Cast ==
- Charlotte Greenwood as Letty Robbins
- Claude Gillingwater as Uncle Claude
- Grant Withers as Harry Miller
- Patsy Ruth Miller as Grace Miller
- Bert Roach as Tommy Robbins
- Marion Byron as Ruth Davis
- Helen Foster as Sally Davis
- Hallam Cooley as Clarence de Brie
- Harry Gribbon as Joe Casey
- Lloyd Ingraham as Judge

== Production ==
To record a yacht scene in Santa Catalina harbor, a barge was outfitted with the sound equipment and towed alongside the yacht during the scene.

== Release and reception ==
The film premiered on October 16, 1929. Film historian Scott Eyman, in his book The Speed of Sound, wrote that the film was one of a wave of more than 70 musicals inundating American movie theaters in 1930. Like most of its genre at the time, it was financially disappointing and "barely broke even" despite the "glorious rowdy Charlotte Greenwood".

== See also ==
- List of early sound feature films (1926–1929)
- List of early Warner Bros. sound and talking features
