= Ben Teal =

American actor

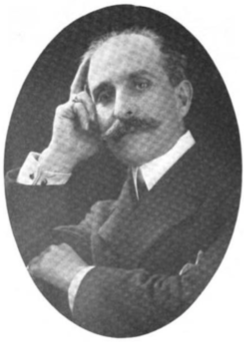
- Teal in 1910
- Born: January 19, 1857; Eugene, Oregon, U.S.
- Died: April 20, 1917 (aged 59); New York City, U.S.
- Resting place: Woodlawn Cemetery
- Occupations: Actor, theater director
- Spouses: Mary Blackburn (m. 1887) Elinor Gilman (m. 1906)

Benjamin Moses Teal (January 19, 1857 – April 20, 1917) was an American actor, theater director, and playwright. He directed over 30 plays on Broadway between 1897 and 1916, and was widely known for his strict, often brusque stage direction. Born in Eugene, Oregon, Teal spent his formative years in San Francisco, where he began performing as a child actor in theatrical productions.

As an adult, Teal began his career as a stage director in San Francisco before relocating to New York City in the latter part of the nineteenth century. Among his directorial credits include the original Broadway production of Ben-Hur (1899), in which he staged the play's elaborate chariot race sequence onstage.

== Life and career ==
Teal was born January 19, 1857, in Eugene, Oregon. (Note: A childhood photograph of Teal in the Oregon Historical Society's Cartes-de-Visite collection has the inscription: "Ben Teal, son of Joseph Teal, in his boyhood. Born in Eugene, Jan. 19, 1857.") He spent his early life in San Francisco, and made his first stage appearance at four or five years old. As an adult, Teal began his career as a stage director in California, before relocating to New York City in the latter part of the century.

He married Mary Blackburn, a native of Sacramento, California, in New York City on June 27, 1887. He later remarried to Portland, Oregon, native Elinor Toomey Gilman in Boston, Massachusetts, on October 9, 1906. In 1894 he directed the musical Palmer Cox's Brownies at the Fourteenth Street Theatre in Manhattan.

Teal gained notoriety for his directing of the original Broadway production of Ben-Hur (1899–1900), in which he successfully arranged an elaborate chariot race sequence on stage. He staged over thirty plays on Broadway between 1897 and 1916. Teal was known for his brusque stage direction and interaction with cast members, though he was noted for being "without peer in his ability to move large numbers of extras around onstage." Writer Edward Jewett Luce noted in 1910: "Ben Teal—the very mention of whose name suggest stage management with a vengeance—is known all over the world as the strictest, yet the most conscientious of stage directors."

== Death ==
Teal died in a New York City sanitarium of an unspecified disease on April 20, 1917. He is interred in Woodlawn Cemetery in the Bronx.

== Stage credits ==
Year	Title	Location	Notes	Ref.
1887	Clito	Baldwin Theatre, San Francisco		
1899	A Reign of Error	Victoria Theater		
1899	In Gay Paree	Casino Theatre		
1899–1900	Ben-Hur	Broadway Theatre		
1900	Chris and the Wonderful Lamp	Victoria Theater		
1900–1901	The Rogers Brothers in Central Park	Victoria Theatre; Grand Opera House		
1900	Foxy Quiller (In Corsica)	Broadway Theatre		
1900	Star and Garter	Victoria Theater		
1900–1901	Sweet Nell of Old Drury	Knickerbocker Theatre		
1901	The Rogers Brothers in Washington	Knickerbocker Theatre		
1901–1902	The Sleeping Beauty and the Beast	Broadway Theatre		
1902	The Rogers Brothers in Harvard	Knickerbocker Theatre		
1904	Whoop-Dee-Doo	Weber and Fields' Music Hall; New Amsterdam Theatre		
1904	An English Daisy	Casino Theatre		
1905–1906	The Rollicking Girl	Herald Square Theatre; New York Theatre		
1905	The Catch of the Season	Daly's Theatre		
1906	The Mountain Climber	Criterion Theatre		
1906	The American Lord	Hudson Theatre		
1906	The Little Father of the Wilderness / The Mountain Climber	Criterion Theatre		
1906–1907	The Little Cherub	Criterion Theatre; Grand Opera House		
1906–1907	The Rich Mr. Hoggenheimer	Wallack's Theatre		
1907	The Rogers Brothers in Panama	Broadway Theatre; Liberty Theater		
1907–1908	The Hoyden	Knickerbocker Theatre; Wallack's Theatre; Grand Opera House		
1908	Fluffy Ruffles	Criterion Theatre		
1910	The Old Town	The Globe Theatre		
1910	A Skylark	New York Theatre		
1912	The Man from Cook's	New Amsterdam Theatre		
1913–1914	Adele	Longacre Theatre; Harris Theatre		
1913–1914	Iole	Longacre Theatre	Also wrote book and lyrics	
1914	The Midnight Girl	44th Street Theatre		
1914	The Red Canary	Lyric Theatre		
1915	The Girl Who Smiles	Lyric Theatre; Longacre Theatre		
1916	Broadway and Buttermilk	Maxine Elliott's Theatre		

== Sources ==
- Luce, Edward Jewett (1910). "IX: In the Amusement World". The Mechanics Lien Law of New Jersey. Soney and Sage. pp. 164–188.
- Sherwood, Garrison P.; Chapman, John, eds. (1955). "Palmer Cox's Brownies". The Best Plays of 1894-1899. Dodd, Mead & Co.
- Wilmeth, Don B.; Bigsby, Christopher, eds. (1998). The Cambridge History of American Theatre. Cambridge, England: Cambridge University Press. ISBN 978-0-521-65179-0.
