= The Brownies =

Publication series by Palmer Cox

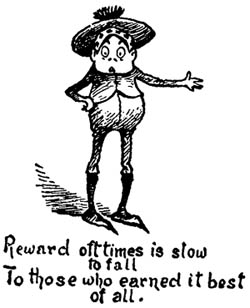
A Palmer Cox Brownie from Brownies Around the World (1894)

The Brownies is a series of publications by Canadian illustrator and author Palmer Cox, based on names and elements from English traditional mythology and Scottish stories told to Cox by his grandmother. Illustrations with verse aimed at children, The Brownies was published in magazines and books during the late 19th century and early 20th century. The Brownie characters became famous in their day, and they were the first North American comic characters to be internationally merchandised.

== Characters and story ==
Brownies are little fairy- or goblin-like creatures who appear at night and make mischief and do helpful tasks. As published by Palmer Cox, they were based on Scottish folktales.

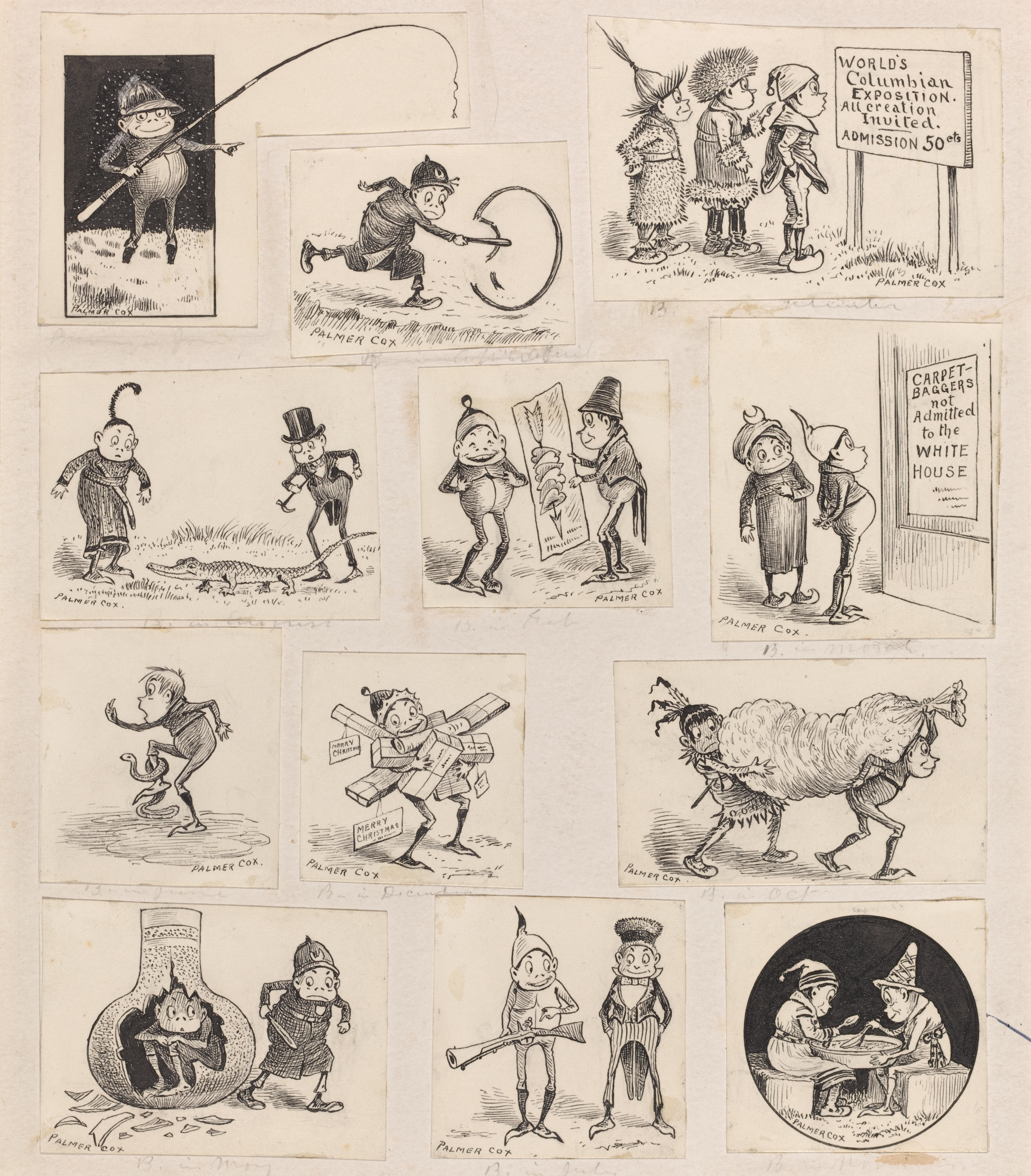
Palmer Cox, Brownies at Home - Twelve Vignettes, c. 1893, NGA 56973

== Publication history ==
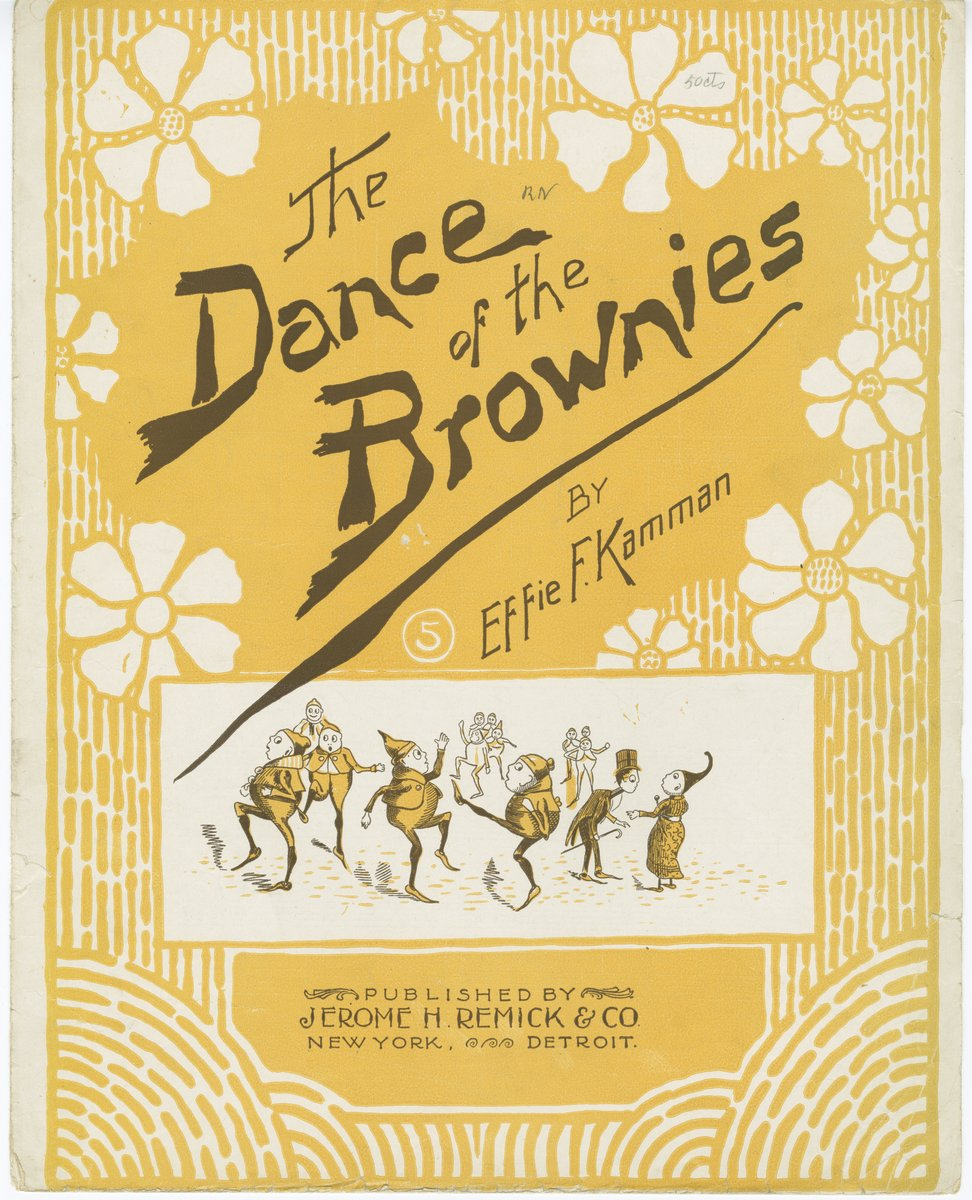
1895 sheet music. Typically of unauthorized merchandising of the era, the appearance of the Brownies characters is similar to but slightly different from Cox's drawings.

The first appearances of Brownie characters in a print publication took place in 1879, but not until the February 1881 issue of Wide Awake magazine were the creatures printed in their final form. The first proper story, The Brownies' Ride, appeared in the February 1883 issue of the children's periodical St. Nicholas Magazine.

Published in 1899, The Brownies Abroad is considered the first Brownie comic strip, though it was mostly a text comic. It didn't utilise speech balloons until the publication The Brownie Clown of Brownie Town of 1908. From 1903, The Brownies appeared as a newspaper Sunday strip for several years.

The first compilation, The Brownies, Their Book, was published in 1887, followed by 16 books in the series until the last in 1918. Palmer Cox died in 1924.

== Merchandising ==
Beyond print publication, The Brownies was at least twice adapted to stage plays. With the rise in popularity of the Brownie characters, these were used in many venues of merchandising, such as games, blocks, cards, dolls, calendars, advertisements, package labels, mugs, plates, flags, soda pop, a slot machine, a bagatelle game and so forth. George Eastman applied the brand name in promotion of Kodak's "Brownie Camera", but Palmer Cox reportedly never received any money from Kodak for the commercial use of his work.

== Adaptations ==
- Palmer Cox's Brownies, musical in three acts with a libretto by Palmer Cox and music by Malcolm Douglas. Premiered at the Park Theatre in Philadelphia, Pennsylvania on October 15, 1894. The show transferred to the Fourteenth Street Theatre in Manhattan where it opened on November 12, 1894.

== Sources ==
- The Brownies list of publications

Footnotes
