= Laura Schirmer Mapleson =

American operatic singer (1862–1894)

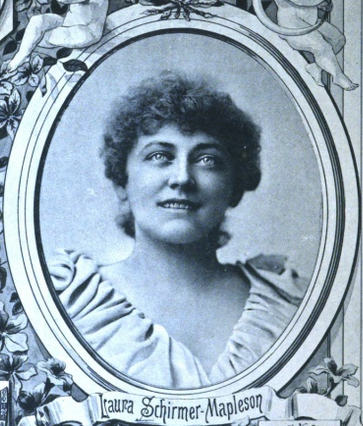
- Born: Laura Marguerite Schirmer; 1862; Boston, Massachusetts, US
- Died: January 24, 1894 (aged 31–32); New York City, US
- Resting place: Mount Auburn Cemetery, Cambridge, Massachusetts (Middlesex County)
- Occupation: singer
- Years active: 1870s-1894
- Spouse(s): Arthur Byron(d.1889); Colonel Henry Mapleson

Laura Schirmer Mapleson (1862–1894) was an American operatic singer in the Victorian era of the 1880–90s.

== Biography ==
Born Laura Marguerite Schirmer in 1862, as a child she began singing in her native Boston. As a teenager she trained in Leipzig, Berlin, and Vienna and appeared in a New York City concert by Franz Rummel. She performed in New York and Boston and in 1883 went to Europe where she married a tenor Arthur Byron in Italy. She appeared at Pisa in Italy, Turkey, Russia and Germany. She appeared in command performance before Turkish ruler Sultan Abdul Hamid II and was scheduled to sing again before his court, but a reporter in Trimm's Petit Journal alleged that she and others had been poisoned in the Sultan's court. She married her second husband Henry Mapleson in Paris in 1890.

She died January 24, 1894, at New York's Everett House of pneumonia, from influenza contracted while performing at the Pittsburgh Opera House on January 13, 1894.

== See also ==
- Sibyl Sanderson

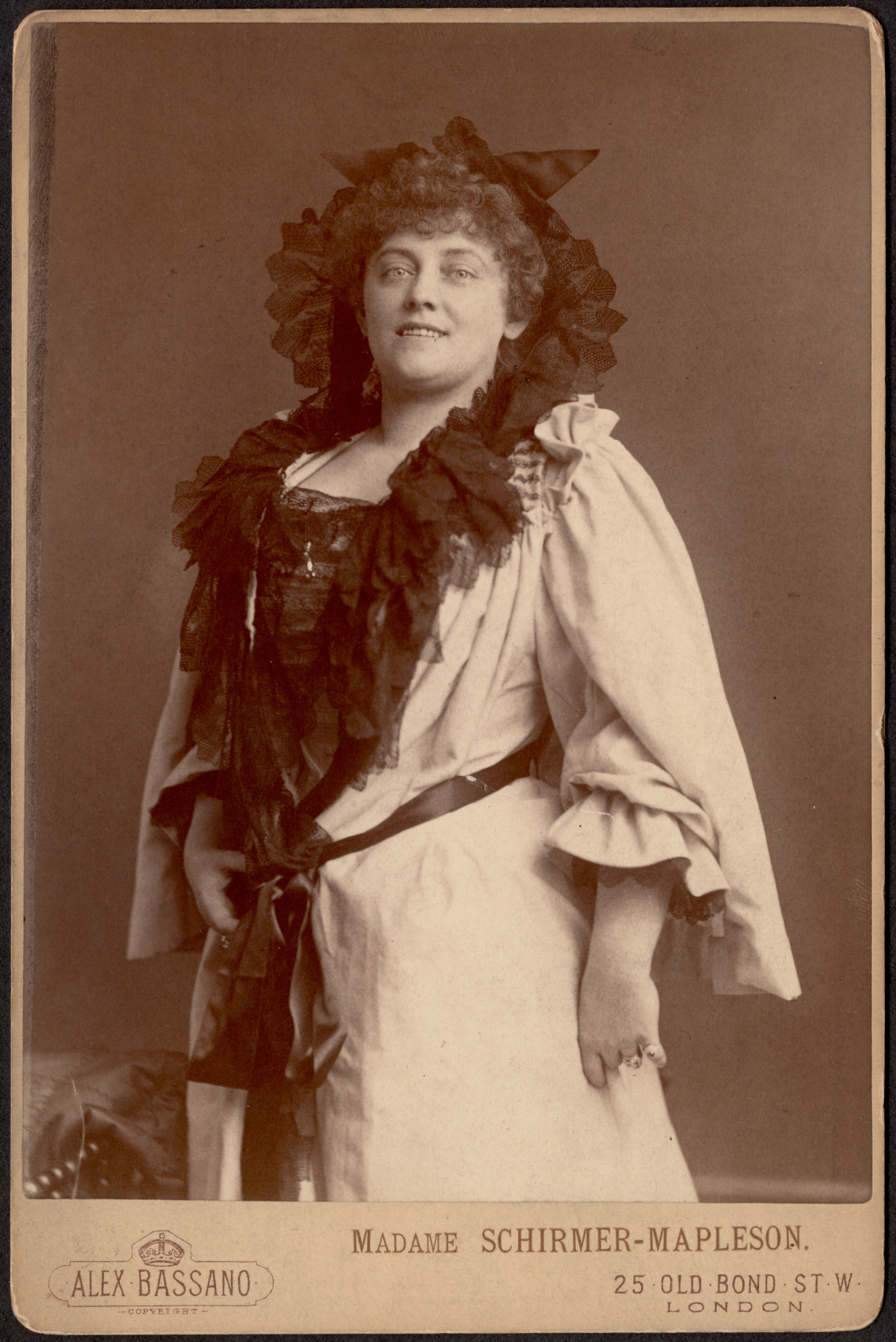
Madame Schirmer-Mapleson, ca. 1890–1894; from the Philip Hale Collection of the Boston Public Library
