= Sydney Grant =

American stage and film actor

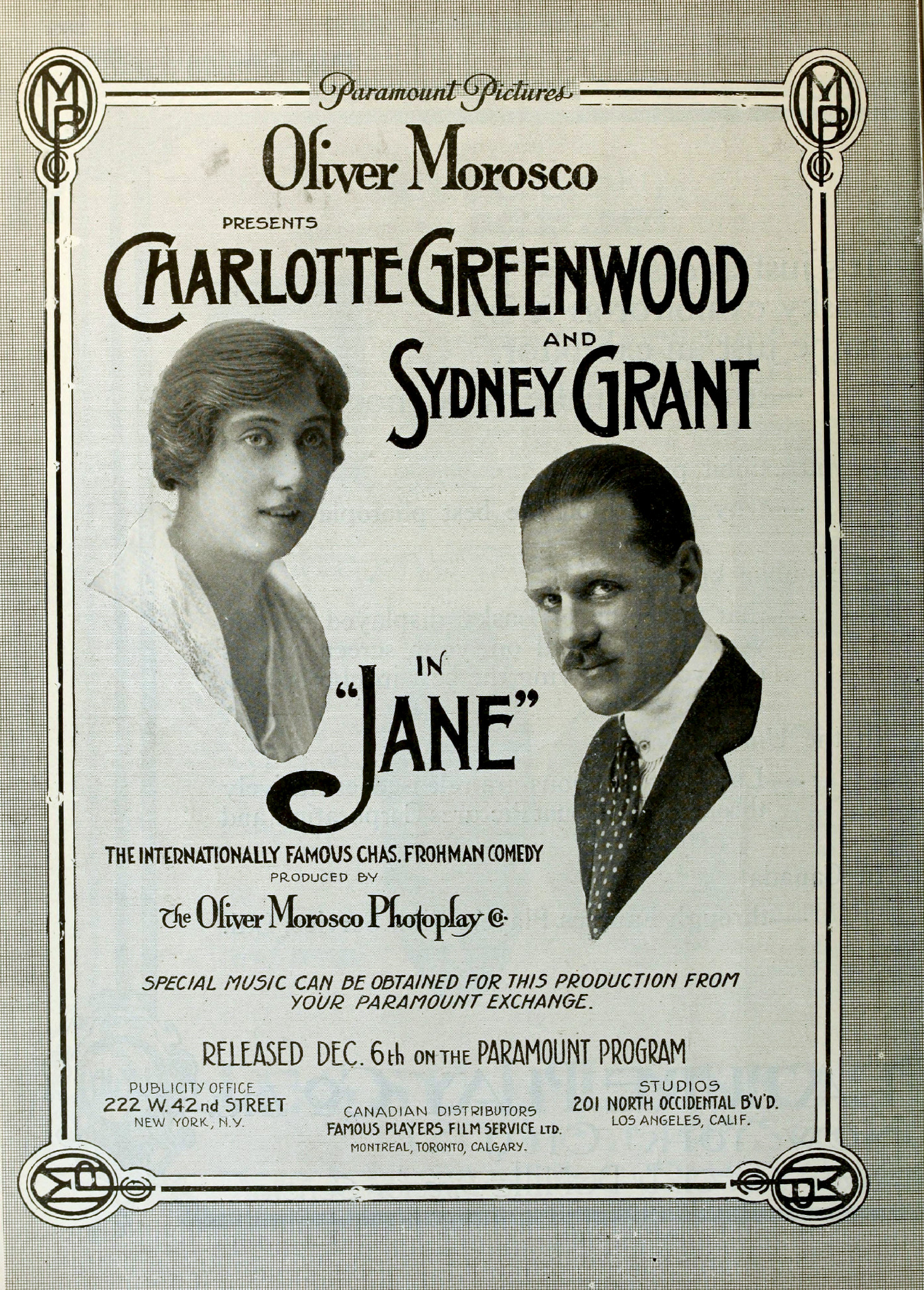

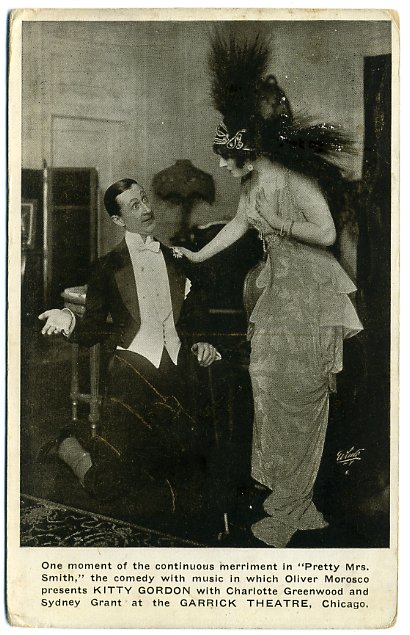

Sydney Grant was an American stage actor who also appeared in two films. He performed with comedian Charlotte Greenwood. She credited him with writing the song "Long, Lean, Lanky Letty".

He did impersonations.

Grant died on July 12, 1953.

== Theater ==
- The Doughgirls as Mr. Jordan
- The Pretty Mrs. Smith (1914)
- So Long Letty

== Filmography ==
- Jane (1915) as William Tipson
- The Power of Right (1919)
