= William Lestocq =

British theatre manager, playwright and actor

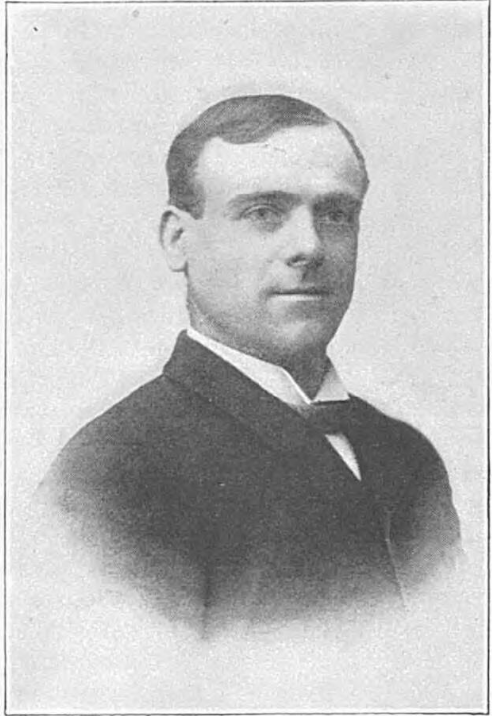
- Lestocq circa 1897
- Born: 1852
- Died: 16 October 1920 (age 68); London
- Occupations: Playwright, theatre manager, actor

William Lestocq (born Lestock Boileau Wooldridge; 1852 – 16 October 1920) was a British theatre manager, playwright, and actor.

He was born in Winchester, Hants, adopting his stage name when he began acting seriously in 1869. He was a member of the Vaudeville Theatre company from 1873 to 1885, where his parts included being in the original cast of Our Boys (1875). A nephew was Humphrey Lestocq, film star.

His authorship credits (often as co-author) include the plays A Bad Penny (1882), The Sultan of Mocha (1887), Uncles and Aunts (1888), In Danger (1889), Jane (1890) (with Harry Nicholls), The Sportsman (1893) (adaptation of Monsieur chasse! by Georges Feydeau), and The Foundling (1894) (with E.M. Robson).

Lestocq was Charles Frohman's representative in London for many years, a relationship which began when Frohman saw the play Jane in London. He would acquire the American rights for English plays for Frohman.

In 1919 Lestocq's play The Foundling was turned into a musical called Nobody's Boy.

Lestocq died in London on 16 October 1920.
