= Harry Nicholls (comedian) =

English actor, comedian, songwriter and playwright

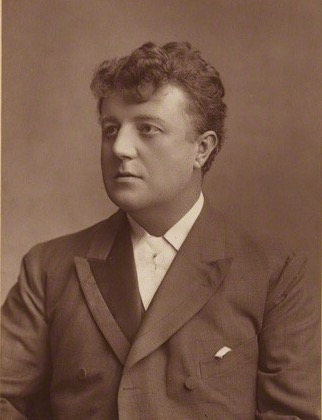
Harry Nicholls, c. 1900 (by Alfred Ellis)

Henry Thomas Nicholls (1 March 1852 – 29 November 1926) was an English actor, comedian, songwriter and playwright, popular during the Victorian era. As an actor, he appeared in music hall, Victorian burlesques and Edwardian musical comedy. He was perhaps best known for starring in the Theatre Royal, Drury Lane's annual Christmas pantomimes, alongside Dan Leno and Herbert Campbell and as the author of long-running musicals at the Gaiety Theatre.

== Biography ==
Nicholls was born in London and was educated at The City of London School. As a youth he worked as a clerk in a railway office and spent some time as an apprentice auctioneer. He became interested in acting and made his stage debut in 1870, acting in provincial theatre where he achieved little success. His London stage debut followed on 3 October 1874, when he played the part of Honeybun at the Old Surrey Theatre in Joseph Stirling Coyne's farce Did You Ever Send Your Wife to Camberwell? Nicholls remained at the theatre for two years. Early in his career, he also played Don Andres in La Perichole with Selina Dolaro's company. He next moved to the Royal Grecian Theatre in Shoreditch. There he met the music hall comedian Herbert Campbell, and the two formed a professional union. In 1876 at the Grecian he played Grizzlegrief in the pantomime The Grim Goblin.

Nicholls married Lucy Jane Pettitt, sister of the dramatist Henry Pettitt, in 1878 in Islington, and they had three children. In 1879, Nicholls was engaged in a short contract at the Folly Theatre where he played comic roles in The Dragoons, Lord Mayor's Day, The First Night, and Heavy Fathers.

=== Drury Lane and Adelphi ===
Nicholls joined the Theatre Royal, Drury Lane company in 1880, and his act together with Campbell became one of the standing features in the Theatre Royal, Drury Lane's elaborate pantomimes until 1893. A reporter for the South Wales Daily News considered: "a Drury Lane pantomime was never complete without the assistance of Mr Harry Nicholls." Among the dramas in which Nicholls appeared during those years were Pluck (1881), Human Nature (1882), A Run of Luck (1885), Pleasure (1886), The Armada (1887), The Royal Oak (1888), A Million of Money (1889), A Sailor's Knot (1890), The Prodigal Daughter (1891), and A Life of Pleasure (1893).

In 1886 the composer Isidore de Lara wrote an operetta entitled Minna; or, The Fall from the Cliff with Nicholls in mind and created a role especially for him. In 1894, Nicholls became contracted to the Adelphi Theatre where he appeared in, among other pieces, Fatal Card.

=== Writing and later life ===
Nicholls was a popular songwriter and author; he collaborated with William Lestocq to write a three-act comedy, Jane, that first played at the Comedy Theatre, London, in 1890. It starred Charles Hawtrey, Henry Kemble, Lottie Venne and Charles Brookfield. He later achieved great success at the Gaiety Theatre with the Edwardian musical comedies A Runaway Girl (1898) and The Toreador (1901). Nicholls appeared at the Gaiety in the role of Hooker Pacha in the long-running musical The Messenger Boy (1900). He was engaged by a touring theatrical company and undertook a six-month tour of South Africa in 1902. In 1910, Nicholls was elected as a warden at the Worshipful Company of Joiners and Ceilers.

Nicholls died at his home, 31 Birch Grove, Acton Hill, London, on 29 November 1926, aged 74. He was buried in Old Chiswick Cemetery.

== Sources ==
- Honigsbaum, Mark (1930). A History of the Great Influenza Pandemics: Death, Panic and Hysteria, 1830-1920. New York: I.B. Taurus & Co Ltd. ISBN 978-1-78076-478-8.
