= Charlotte Greenwood =

American actress

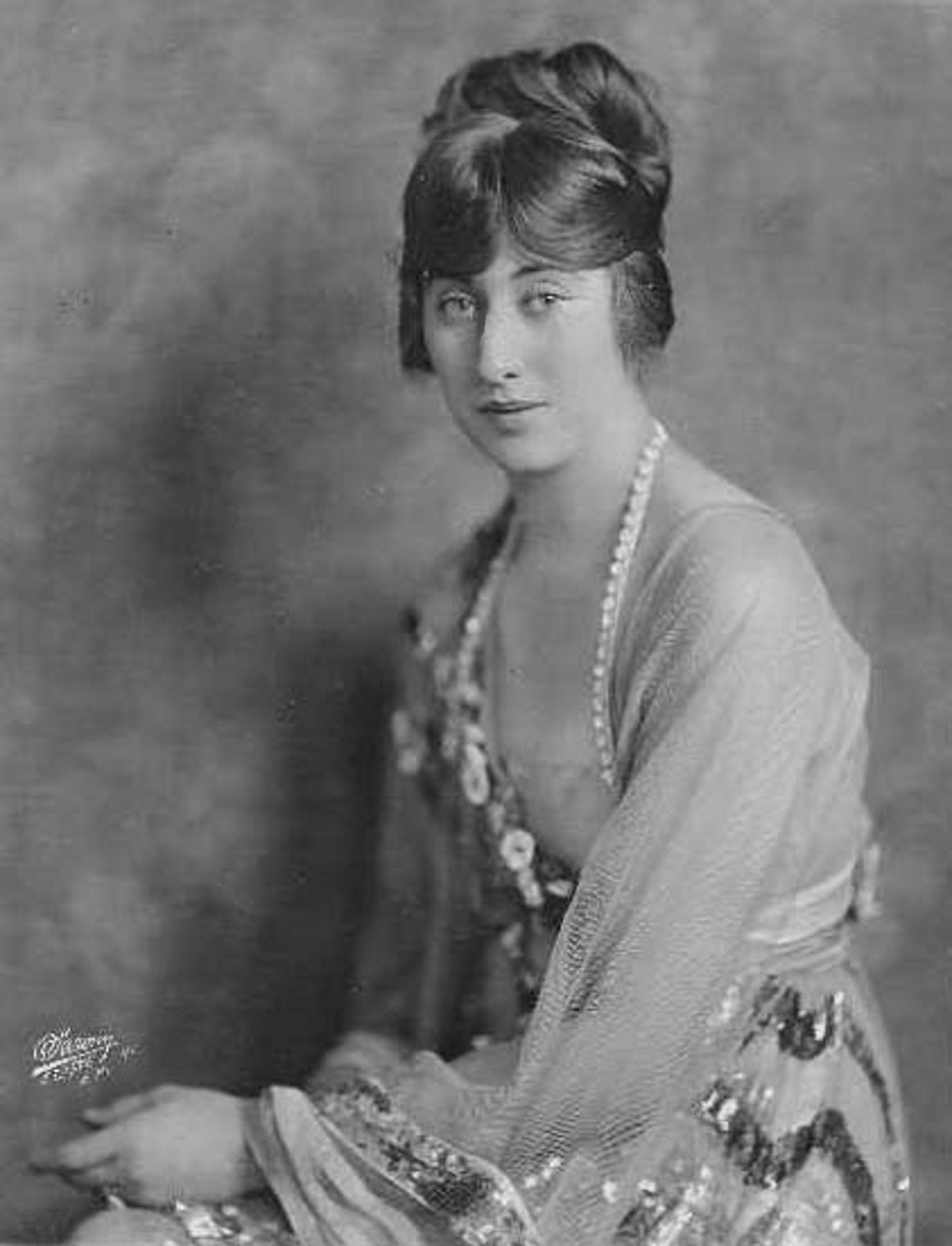
- Born: Frances Charlotte Greenwood; June 25, 1890; Philadelphia, Pennsylvania, U.S.
- Died: December 28, 1977 (aged 87); Los Angeles, California, U.S.
- Occupations: Actress, comedian, dancer
- Years active: 1905–1961
- Spouse(s): Cyril Ring (m. 1915; div. 1922) Martin Broones (m. 1924; died 1971)

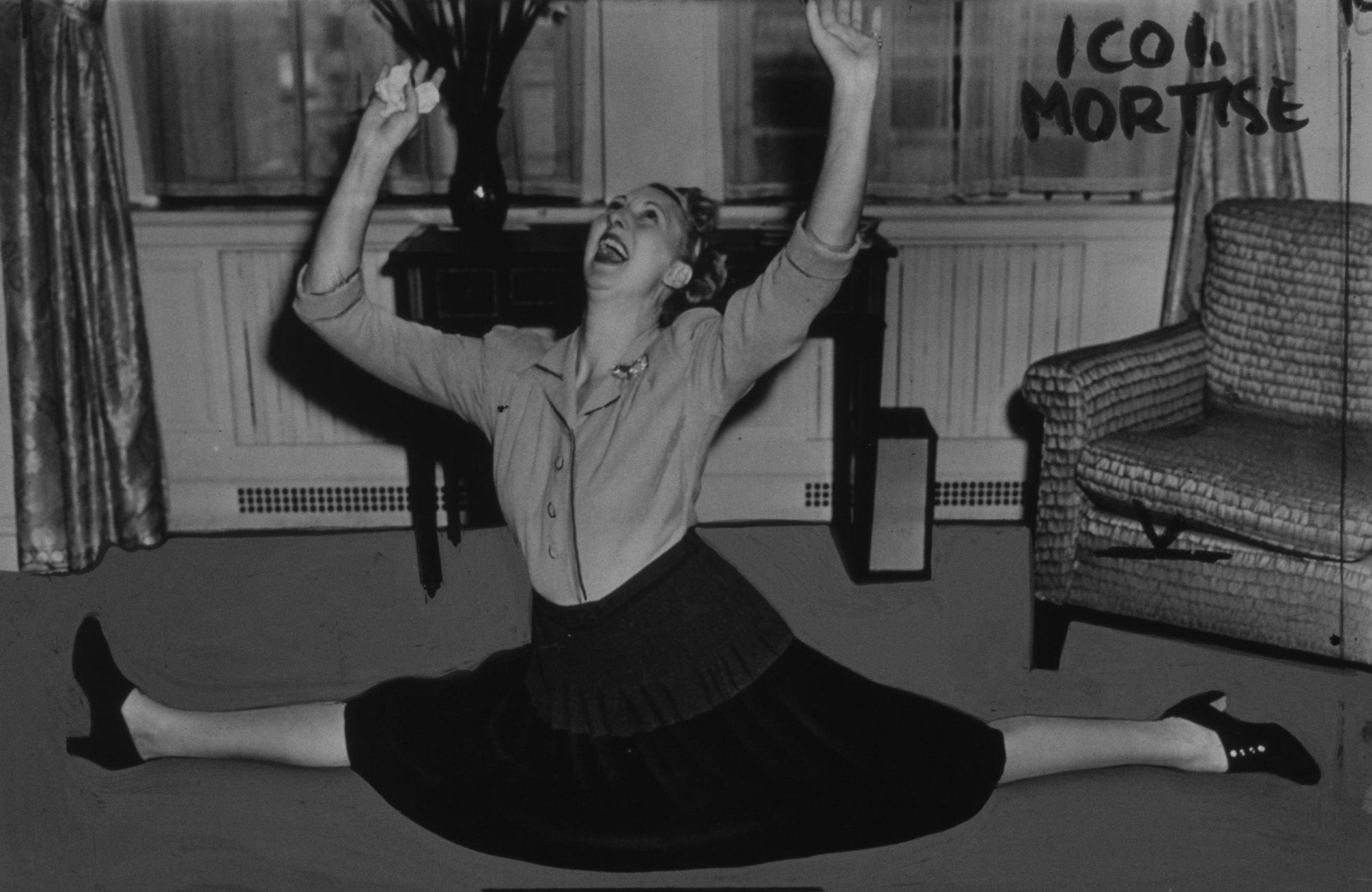
Charlotte Greenwood was known for being a very limber performer.

lithograph poster for Greenwood's follow up Letty play, Linger Longer Letty, 1919.

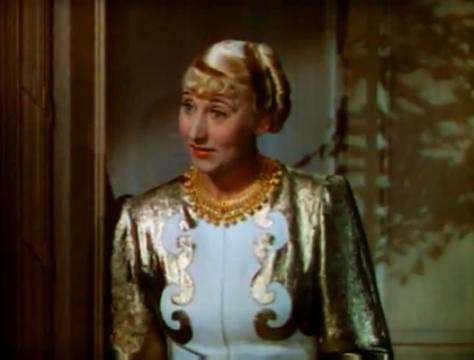
Charlotte Greenwood in Down Argentine Way (1940)

Frances Charlotte Greenwood (June 25, 1890 – December 28, 1977) was an American actress, comedian and dancer. Born in Philadelphia, Greenwood started in vaudeville and starred on Broadway, in movies and on radio. Standing almost six feet tall (some sources say 5'10"), she was best known for her long legs and high kicks. She described herself as the "only woman in the world who could kick a giraffe in the eye."

== Theatre ==
While still a teenager, Charlotte Greenwood made her professional stage debut in 1905 as a dancer in Ludwig Englander's musical The White Cat. Between 1909 and 1912 Greenwood performed in vaudeville as part of a sister act, "Burnam and Greenwood." The act broke up when Greenwood was hired for the Winter Garden Revue.

In 1913, Oliver Morosco cast her as Queen Ann Soforth of Oogaboo late in the run of L. Frank Baum and Louis F. Gottschalk's The Tik-Tok Man of Oz (better known in its novelization as Tik-Tok of Oz). In 1916, Morosco commissioned a successful star vehicle stage play titled So Long Letty. In 1919 Morosco brought her back in the sequel Linger Longer Letty. This role made her a star; she reprised it in the 1929 movie of the same name.

She appeared with actors including Charles Ruggles, Betty Grable, Jimmy Durante, Eddie Cantor, Buster Keaton, Don Ameche, and Carmen Miranda. Most of Greenwood's best work was done on the stage, and was lauded by such critics as James Agate, Alexander Woollcott, and Claudia Cassidy. One of her most successful roles was that of Juno in Cole Porter's Out of This World in which she introduced the Porter classic "I Sleep Easier Now". She had some discomfort with that play because she had become a devout Christian Scientist and feared the play was too risqué.

== Film ==
Greenwood appeared in numerous movies. When not showcasing her trademark high kicks and splits in comic roles for musicals, she played occasional serio-comic roles such as Lon McAllister's aunt in Home in Indiana. Her last memorable role was as the feisty Aunt Eller in the 1955 film adaptation of Rodgers and Hammerstein's Oklahoma! (1955), starring Gordon MacRae and Shirley Jones.

== Radio ==
Greenwood had her own radio program, The Charlotte Greenwood Show, a sitcom. It was broadcast from 1944 to 1946, first on ABC and later on NBC. She also was in "Home in Indiana" on Lux Radio Theatre October 2, 1944.

== Recordings ==
Greenwood ventured into recorded music with an album of songs from Cole Porter's musical Out of This World and another from the musical comedy Oh, by Jingo.

== Personal life ==
Greenwood first married actor Cyril Ring, brother of actress Blanche Ring. They divorced. Her second husband was composer Martin Broones. He died in 1971. Both unions were childless.

In her post-retirement years, Greenwood suffered severely from arthritis. She and Broones were Christian Scientists – he was a C.S. practitioner and teacher of Christian Science for over two decades, and he consulted with Doris Day in that capacity. Greenwood also became a listed public Christian Science practitioner until her death in 1977, using the name Charlotte Greenwood Broones.

Greenwood died in Los Angeles at age 87. She had been out of the public eye for decades, and it was months before the world became aware of her passing.

== Stage work ==
Stage credits of Charlotte Greenwood
Date	Title	Role	Ref(s)
Jul 22, 1912 - Nov 16, 1912	The Passing Show of 1912	Performer	
Jan 23, 1913 - Mar 08, 1913	The Man with Three Wives	Performer	
Jul 24, 1913 - Sep 1913	The Passing Show of 1913	Performer	
Sep 21, 1914 - Oct 31, 1914	Pretty Mrs. Smith	Letititia Proudfoot	
1916	The Tik-Tok Man of Oz	Queen Ann Soforth	
Oct 23, 1916 - Jan 13, 1917	So Long Letty	Letty Robbins	
Oct 23, 1916 - Jan 1917	Les So Long	Performer	
Nov 20, 1919 - Jan 21, 1920	Linger Longer Letty	Letty	
Apr 10, 1922 - May 6, 1922	Letty Pepper	Letty Pepper	
Oct 23, 1922 - Aug 04, 1923	Music Box Revue [1922-23]	Performer	
Sep 17, 1924 - Dec 1924	Hassard Short's Ritz Revue	Performer	
Mar 28, 1927 - May 1927	Rufus LeMaire's Affairs	Performer, The Dove, Nervous Patient, Leading Lady, Lorelei	
Dec 21, 1950 - May 5, 1951	Out of This World	June	

== Filmography ==
Film credits of Charlotte Greenwood
Year	Title	Role	Silent	Sound	Studio/Distributor	Ref(s)
1915	Jane	Jane	X		Morosco Photoplay Company	
1916	Miss George Washington	Attendee at tea social (uncredited)	X		Famous Players Film Company	
1926	Crossed Signals	(uncredited) Mother with baby at train station	X		Rayart	
1927	Women Love Diamonds	(uncredited/deleted)	X		MGM	
1928	Baby Mine	Emma	X		MGM	
1929	So Long Letty	Letty Robbins		X	Warner Bros. Pictures	
1931	Parlor, Bedroom and Bath	Polly Hathaway		X	MGM	
1931	Flying High	Pansy		X	MGM	
1931	The Man in Possession	Clara		X	MGM	
1931	Stepping Out	Sally Smith		X	MGM	
1931	Palmy Days	Helen Martin		X	Howard Productions Inc.	
1932	Cheaters at Play	Crozier		X	Fox Film	
1934	Orders Is Orders	Wanda Sinclair		X	Gaumont-British	
1940	Young People	Kit Ballantine		X	20th Century Fox	
1940	Star Dust	Lola Langdon		X	20th Century Fox	
1940	Down Argentine Way	Binnie Crawford		X	20th Century Fox	
1941	Moon Over Miami	Susan Latimer		X	20th Century Fox	
1941	Tall, Dark and Handsome	Mrs. Winnie Sage		X	20th Century Fox	
1941	The Perfect Snob	Martha Mason		X	20th Century Fox	
1942	Springtime in the Rockies	Phoebe Gray		X	20th Century Fox	
1943	The Gang's All Here	Mrs. Peyton Potter		X	20th Century Fox	
1943	Dixie Dugan	Mrs. Dugan		X	20th Century Fox	
1944	Home in Indiana	Penny Bolt		X	20th Century Fox	
1944	Up in Mabel's Room	Martha		X	Edward Small Productions	
1946	Wake Up and Dream	Sara March		X	20th Century Fox	
1947	Driftwood	Mathilda		X	Republic Pictures	
1949	Oh, You Beautiful Doll	Anna Breitenbach		X	20th Century Fox	
1949	The Great Dan Patch	Aunt Netty		X	W. R. Frank Productions	
1950	Peggy	Mrs. Emelia Fielding		X	Universal Pictures	
1953	Dangerous When Wet	Ma Higgins		X	MGM	
1955	Oklahoma!	Aunt Eller		X	Rodgers & Hammerstein Pictures, Inc.	
1956	Glory	Miz Agnes Tilbee		X	David Butler Productions, Inc.	
1956	The Opposite Sex	Lucy		X	MGM	

== Sources ==
- Hayter-Menzies, Grant. Charlotte Greenwood: The Life and Career of the Comic Star of Vaudeville, Radio and Film. McFarland & Company, Inc., Jefferson, North Carolina and London, 2007; ISBN 978-0-7864-2995-0.
- Cullen, Frank; Hackman, Florence; McNeilly, Donald (2007). Vaudeville old & new: an encyclopedia of variety performances in America. Psychology Press. ISBN 978-0-415-93853-2.
- Liebman, Roy (2017). Broadway Actors in Films, 1894-2015. McFarland. ISBN 978-1-4766-2615-4.
