= 2010s in anthropology =

- 2000s
- 2010s in anthropology
Other topics in 2010s:
- Comics
- Fashion
- Motorsport
- Music
- Science and technology
- Sociology
- Television
- Video games

Timeline of anthropology, 2010–2019

== Events ==
2013

- Discovery of Homo naledi an extinct species of hominin, found in the Dinaledi Chamber of the Rising Star Cave system in South Africa's Gauteng province

2015

- Announcement of the discovery of Homo naledi made

== Deaths ==
=== 2011 ===
- Lewis Binford (April 11) (archaeologist)
- Carlos Iván Degregori (May 18)
- Edmund Snow Carpenter (July 1)
- Allen R. Maxwell (November 16)
- Marc Swartz (December 14)

=== 2012 ===
- Elizabeth Brumfiel (January 1)
- Steven Rubenstein (March 8)
- Dennison J. Nash (March 20)
- Neil L. Whitehead (March 22)
- Phillip V. Tobias (June 7)
- Michel-Rolph Trouillot (July 5)
- Anna Lou Dehavenon

=== 2013 ===
- Masao Yamaguchi

== Publications ==
- David Graeber, Debt: The First 5000 Years (2011)
- Tim Ingold, Being Alive: Essays on Movement, Knowledge and Description (2011)
- Christoph Antweiler, Inclusive Humanism: Anthropological Basics for a Realistic Cosmopolitanism (2011)
- Angela Davis, The Meaning of Freedom: And Other Difficult Dialogues (2012)
