= 2010s in science and technology =

- 2000s
- 2010s in science and technology
- 2020s
Other topics in 2010s:
- Anthropology
- Comics
- Fashion
- Motorsport
- Music
- Sociology
- Television
- Video games

This article is a summary of the 2010s in science and technology.

== Technology ==
Big data and "Big Tech" saw an expansion in size and power in the 2010s, particularly FAANG corporations. The growing influence of "Big Tech" over cyberspace drew scrutiny and increased oversight from national governments. The G20 countries began closing tax loopholes and the European Union began asserting legal guidelines over domains such as data privacy, copyright, and hate speech, the latter of which helped fuel a debate over tech censorship and free speech online, particularly deplatforming. Throughout the decade, the United States government increasingly scrutinized the tech industry, from attempted copyright regulations to threatening antitrust probes. Increased protectionism and attempts to regulate and localize the internet by national governments also raised fears of cyber-balkanization in the later half of the decade. Search engines also gained popularity in 2010.

=== Communications and electronics ===
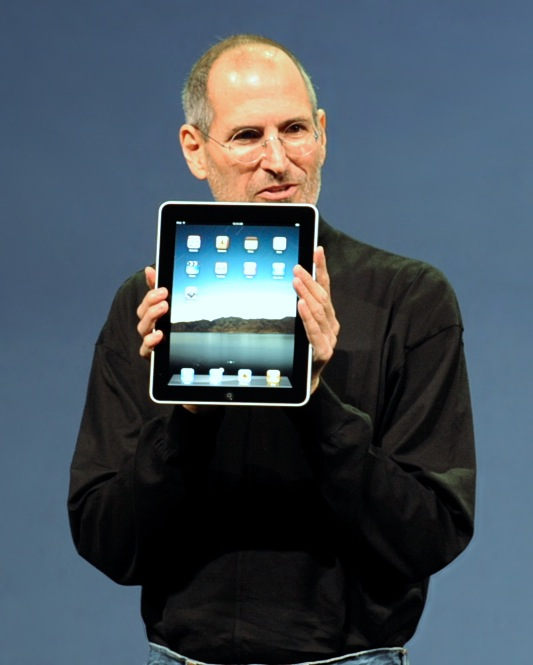
Apple CEO Steve Jobs unveiled the first iPad at a press conference on 27 January 2010.

- Smartphones maintained their strong popularity throughout the 2010s, along with the arrival of tablets. Apple Inc. launched the iPad in 2010, its first tablet computer, which offered multi-touch interaction. The iPad became an immediate bestseller and only months after its release became the best selling tech product in history. By the mid-2010s, almost all smartphones were touchscreen-only, and Android and iPhone smartphones dominated the market.
  - Mobile apps become commercially available in the early 2010s, along with popular app stores such as Google Play, iOS App Store, and Microsoft Store.
  - Throughout the early 2010s, sales for PCs declined in favor of tablet computers and laptop convertibles; in 2012, tablet and smartphone sales overtook netbooks and Samsung overtook Nokia for the first time as the largest mobile phone maker in the world; in 2013 in developed countries, smartphone sales surpassed feature phones.
  - In April 2019, South Korea became the first country to adopt 5G broadband. Verizon launched its 5G services in the United States just hours later, along with disputing South Korea's claim of becoming the world's first country with a 5G network. The United Kingdom's first 5G mobile network became operational on 30 May, initially covering parts of six cities.
- In 2011, more than 2 billion people used the Internet, one billion mobile broadband users predicted and 4.6 billion people worldwide were subscribed to mobile phones.
  - Social media continuously gained prominence through the convenience of mobile apps, including the services of WhatsApp, Pinterest, Instagram, Snapchat, Tinder, Vine, and TikTok being released throughout the decade. Facebook and Twitter, both of which were released in the 2000s, were still among the most popular social media platforms in the world. Social media offered massive reach to mainstream audiences for both individuals and organizations unseen before, facilitating phenomena such as influencer marketing.
  - Streaming media and rental kiosk services such as Netflix and Redbox forced video rental chains such as Blockbusters to close.
  - At the turn of the decade, the supply of IPv4 internet addresses was exhausted; an early period of transition to IPv6 continued during 2011.
  - In 2012, Google Chrome became the world's most used web browser, replacing Internet Explorer, and the Wikimedia Foundation started developing Wikidata, its first new project in six years.
- Cryptocurrency, such as Bitcoin and Ethereum, gained ground as a digitally alternative way to secure financial transactions, control the creation of additional units, and verify the transfer of assets. Cryptocurrencies also expanded the usage and boundaries of Blockchain.
- Virtual reality took a radical shift in the 2010s, with headsets such as the Oculus Rift gaining popularity. While the device was only capable of rotational tracking, the initial design would later serve as a basis from which the later designs came. Other popular headsets include PlayStation VR, Google Cardboard, HTC Vive, Oculus Rift, and the Samsung Gear VR.
- During the decade, 3D printing, 3D modeling, and 3D scanners became increasingly popular, in which the technologies enabled users to join or solidify certain materials to create a concrete three-dimensional object. The 3D printer industry gained over $7 billion in sales.
- Wireless headphones saw technological advancements and a large growth in usage.
- Wireless charging for smartphones became more popular, with companies such as Samsung and Apple releasing wireless charging phones and chargers.
- Smart watches became more widespread in usage, with over 175 million of them sold in 2018.
  - Smart glasses, such as Google Glass, were also released during this decade.
- Transparent display screens and curved touchscreen displays entered the market, and slowly gained popularity throughout the decade.
  - In the mid-late portion of the decade, 4K resolution was implemented through high-definition displays and gained traction into more U.S. homes in a much faster adoption rate than that of Full HD (1080p).
- In 2016, scientists at MIT created the first five-atom quantum computer with the potential to crack the security of traditional encryption schemes.
- Fixstars Solutions created the world's first 13 Terabyte SSD in 2016.
- The number of IoT devices increased 31% year-over-year to 8.4 billion in the year 2017 and it was estimated that there will be 30 billion devices by 2020.

=== Software ===
- Artificial intelligence progressed significantly as a result of discoveries made in deep learning in 2012; it bolstered speech recognition and computer vision development and allowed for the fruition of technologies such as Deepfakes.
  - Virtual assistant devices and apps become widely available in the decade, such as Apple's Siri, Amazon Alexa on the Amazon Echo device, Samsung's Bixby, Google Assistant on Google-enabled/Android mobile devices, and text (online chat), especially in an instant messaging app or other app.
- Collaborative source code sharing website GitHub became the world's most popular open source hosting site.
- Oracle sued Google over the use of Java-related technology in Google's popular Android operating system in 2011. Google won the lawsuit on 26 May 2016, citing fair use.
- Following an unprecedented internet protest and blackout campaign, the controversial Stop Online Piracy Act bill was temporarily withdrawn in the United States Congress in 2012.
- The controversial Cybercrime Prevention Act of 2012 in the Philippines was adopted.

=== Automobiles and transportation ===
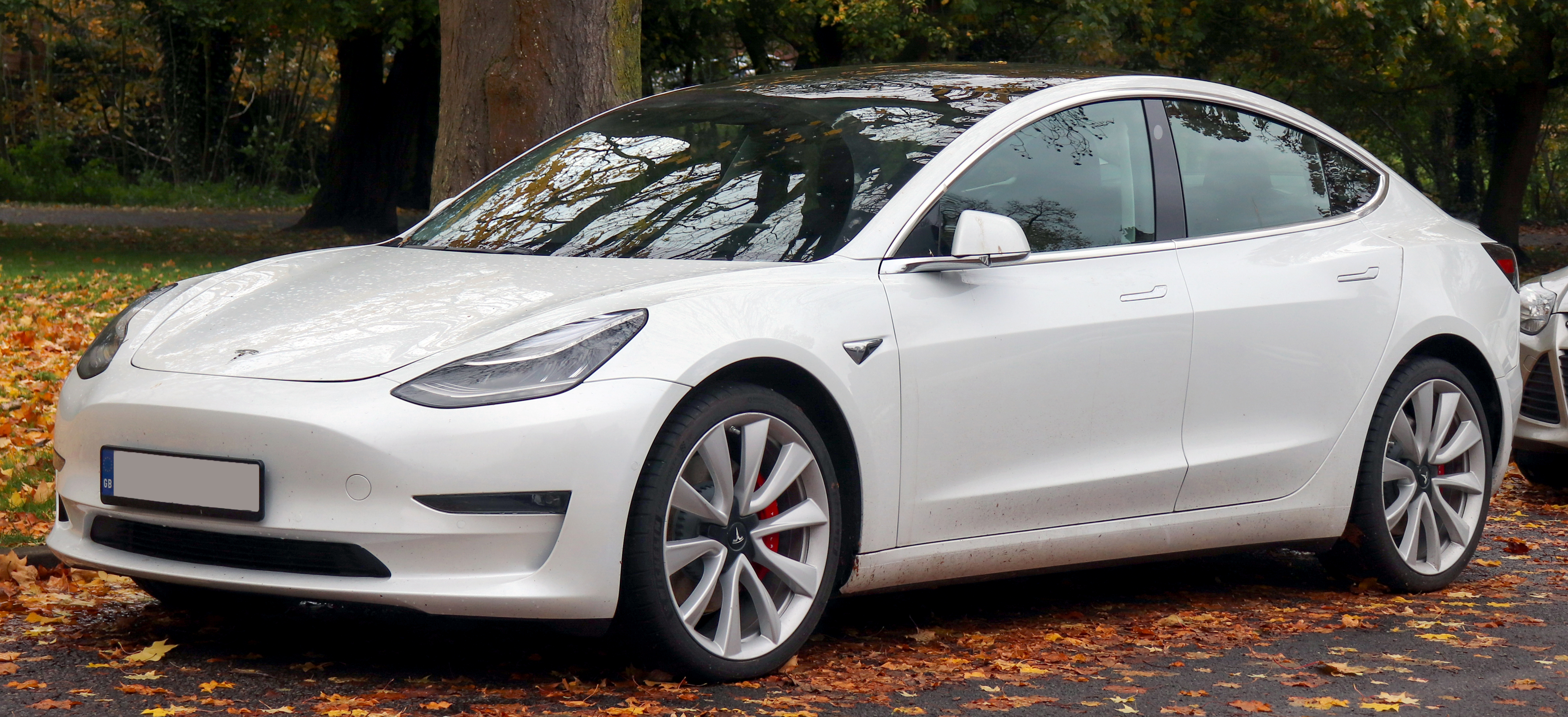
Tesla's all-electric sedan, the Tesla Model 3, was unveiled in March 2016 and became the best-selling plug-in electric car.

- Drones became increasingly popular, especially in the assistance of making deliveries, aerial photography, and drone racing.
- Electric and hybrid vehicles became popular in many countries in the Western world during the decade. Notable electric vehicles include the Chevrolet Volt, which became the world's top selling plug-in hybrid of all time with over 100,000 units sold in 2015. Other hybrid vehicles have also been noted such as the Porsche Panamera and BMW i3.
- Self-driving cars, while still in their infancy, were widely tested throughout the 2010s with significant progress. Google developed Waymo, the world's first self-driving car, to be licensed for use on public roads in 2011. In 2018, a woman in Tempe, Arizona became the first recorded casualty of an accident involving an autonomous vehicle.
- Automaker Volkswagen is alleged to have been involved in worldwide rigging of diesel emissions tests in 2015, affecting an estimated 11 million vehicles globally.
- The trend of shared mobility grew significantly during the decade. Carsharing, bike-sharing, and scooter-sharing services saw substantial growth as multiple economic, social and technological factors such as developments in "last mile" transportation helped changed the way people think about modern transportation, particularly in the Western world.
- The world's first 100% low-floor tram with articulated bogies, Škoda 15 T, began operations in Riga, Latvia.

== Space ==
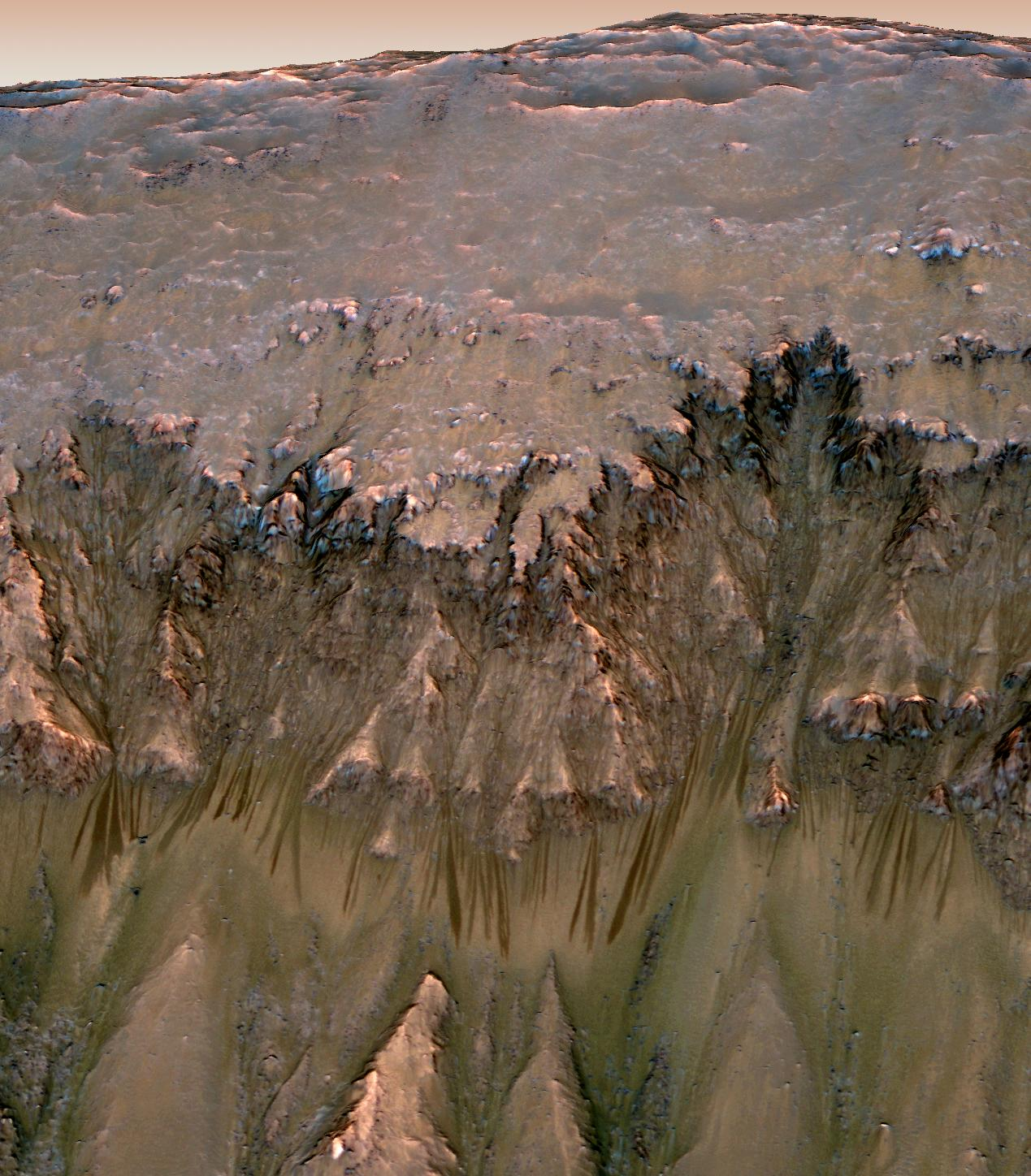
NASA announced that its Mars Reconnaissance Orbiter captured photographic evidence of possible liquid water on Mars on 4 August 2011.

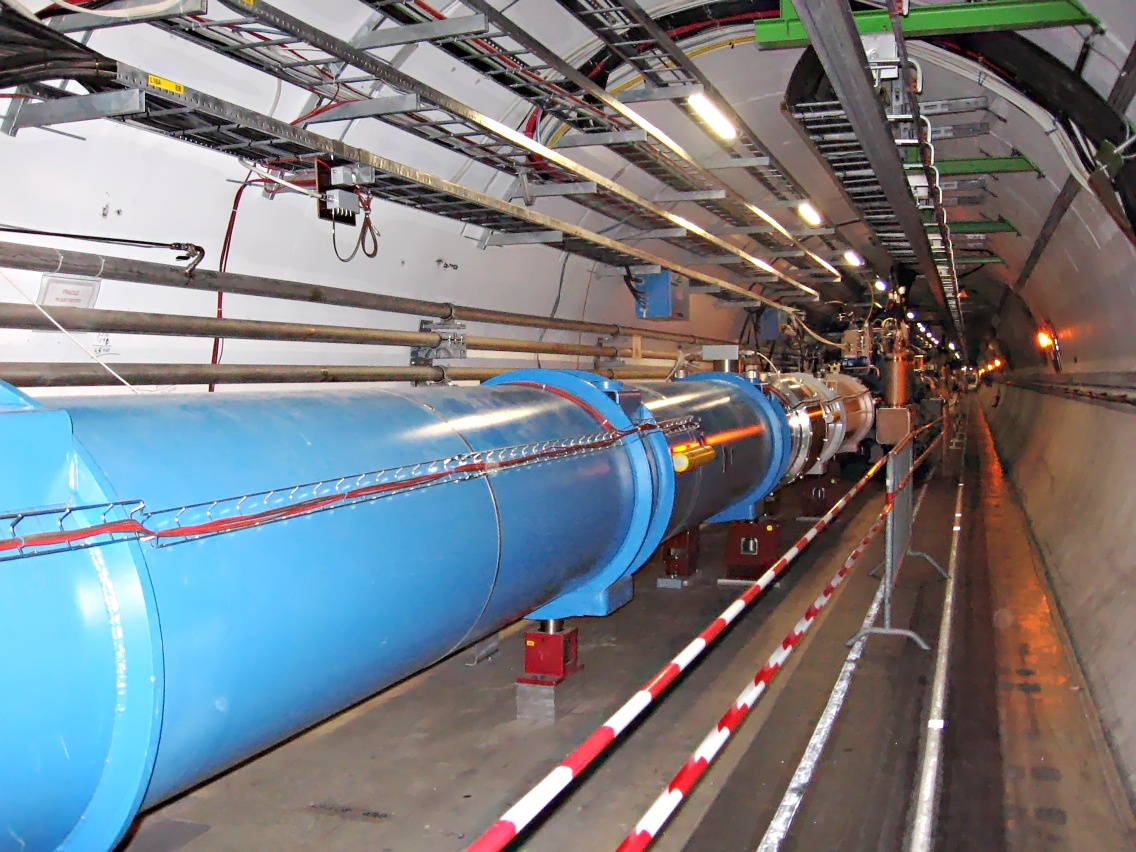
The first collisions of CERN's Large Hadron Collider took place on 31 March 2010.

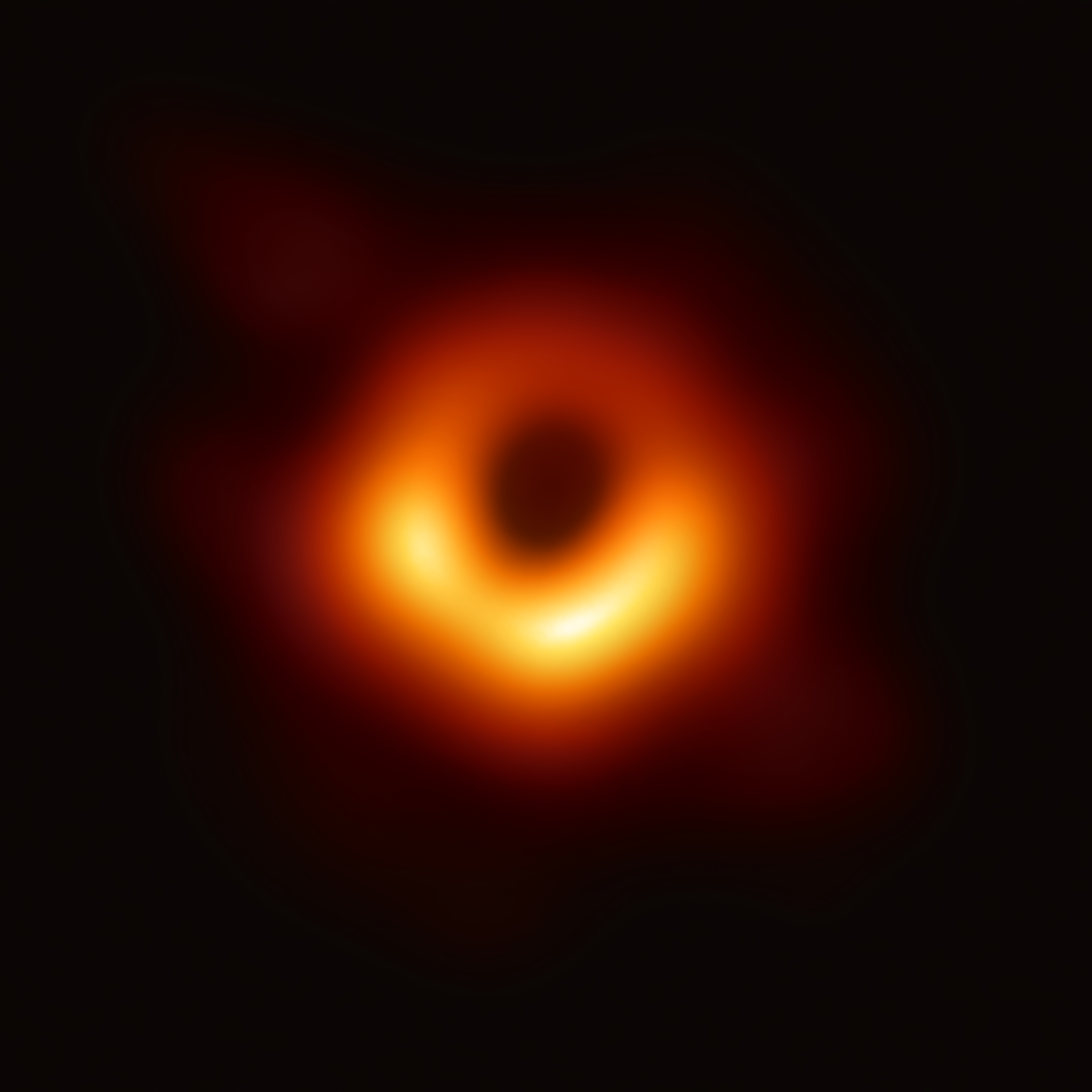
The first-ever image of a supermassive black hole, located in the Messier 87 galaxy, was revealed on 10 April 2019.

Spaceflight became increasingly privatized, including crewed spaceflight. SpaceX captures a significant share of the commercial launch market with Falcon 9. Falcon 9 became the first rocket to land its booster propulsively for reuse, in 2019 most flights reused boosters. Several other companies started working on partially reusable rockets while SpaceX started development of a fully reusable rocket, Starship. Towards the end of the decade around 100 companies were developing rockets for the small satellite market, some have made test flights and Rocketlab's Electron made multiple commercial flights. The Space Shuttle was retired in 2011. SpaceX and Boeing developed commercial crewed spacecraft for orbital flights (SpaceX Dragon 2, Starliner), Dragon 2 made its first crewed flights in 2020. Blue Origin develops the crewed New Shepard for suborbital flights. Virgin Galactic develops a spacecraft for suborbital flights and performs first crewed flights. NASA Dawn probe was the first spacecraft to orbit two extraterrestrial bodies, the first spacecraft to visit either Vesta or Ceres, and the first to orbit a dwarf planet, arriving at Ceres in March 2015, a few months before New Horizons flew by Pluto in July 2015.

Other notable developments in astronomy and spaceflight over the decade included:

- 2011: NASA announced that its Mars Reconnaissance Orbiter captured photographic evidence of possible liquid water on Mars during warm seasons.
- 2011: The United States' Space Shuttle program officially ended following its last mission, STS-135, flown by Space Shuttle Atlantis.
- 2012: SpaceX's Dragon spacecraft became the first private commercial spacecraft to attach to the International Space Station, the first commercial spacecraft to rendezvous with another spacecraft.
- 2012: NASA landed the Curiosity rover in Gale crater on Mars.
- 2013: The Chinese Chang'e 3 landed on the Moon, the first Lunar landing in 37 years.
- 2014: The Philae probe from the Rosetta spacecraft landed on the surface of Comet 67P/Churyumov-Gerasimenko
- 2014: The Orion spacecraft completed its first test flight, an unmanned orbital and reentry flight.
- 2015: NASA's Dawn probe entered orbit around Ceres, becoming the first spacecraft to visit a dwarf planet.
- 2015: NASA announced that liquid water had been found on Mars.
- 2015: NASA's New Horizons probe became the first spacecraft to reach Pluto, completing its main mission.
- 2015: SpaceX's Falcon 9 rocket successfully landed after a launch, making it the first rocket to successfully return and perform a vertical landing.
- 2016: The ESA and Roscosmos launched the joint ExoMars Trace Gas Orbiter on a mission to Mars.
- 2016: SpaceX lands the first reusable rocket, a CRS-8 rocket on a droning platform at sea.
- 2016: NASA's Juno spacecraft enters orbit around Jupiter and begins a 20-month survey of the planet.
- 2016: Solar Impulse 2 becomes the first solar-powered aircraft to circumnavigate the Earth.
- 2016: Proxima Centauri b is discovered as closest exoplanet to Earth that may be habitable.
- 2016: NASA launches OSIRIS-REx, its first asteroid sample return mission. The probe will visit Bennu and is expected to return with samples in 2023.
- 2016: The Five-hundred-meter Aperture Spherical Telescope, the largest radio telescope in the world, built in Guizhou, China, makes its first light.
- 2018: SpaceX's Falcon Heavy rocket successfully performs its first flight. As of its launch it was the most powerful rocket in operation.
- 2018: NASA's Kepler mission ends after the spacecraft runs out of fuel.
- 2018: NASA's Dawn mission concludes after it runs out of hydrazine fuel.
- 2019: Chinese probe Chang'e 4 becomes the first human-made object to land on the far side of the Moon.
- 2019: NASA concludes the 15-year Opportunity rover mission after being unable to wake the rover from hibernation.
- 2019: The first image of the supermassive black hole inside galaxy Messier 87 was captured by the Event Horizon Telescope.

== Computing and artificial intelligence ==
- The number of internet users doubled from about 2 billion to about 4 billion, surpassing half the world population in 2018.
- Smartphones became increasingly common due to a rapid increase in sales. Their applications and use time by the average user increased, too.
- Google develops the world's first self-driving car to be licensed for use on public roads. It was the first driverless ride that was on a public road and was not accompanied by a test driver or police escort. The car had no steering wheel or floor pedals.
- In 2012, Google Chrome became the world's most used web browser, displacing former long-time frontrunner Internet Explorer.
- Microsoft announces Windows Mixed Reality (previously Windows Holographic).
- Quantum computers made rapid progress. In 2019 Google announced to have achieved quantum supremacy, although this claim is disputed.
- During this decade artificial intelligence based on deep learning neural networks experienced rapid advancement, resulting in multiple practical applications in diverse fields such as speech and image recognition, social network moderation, virtual assistants, surveillance, healthcare or even art generation. In 2016, Google artificial intelligence program AlphaGo beat human grandmaster in the game of Go for the first time.

=== Legal issues ===
- In August 2010, Oracle sued Google for copyright and patent infringement over the use of Java-related technology in Google's popular Android operating system for smartphones and tablet computers. Oracle asserted Google was aware that they had developed Android without a Java license and copied its APIs, creating the copyright violation. Oracle cited patents related to the Java technology created by Sun and now owned by Oracle that Google should have been aware of.
- Following an unprecedented internet protest and blackout campaign in 2012 in which many popular websites took part, the widely criticised Stop Online Piracy Act (SOPA) bill was temporarily withdrawn in the US Congress, pending resolution of the issues identified.

=== Software development ===
- Collaborative source code sharing website GitHub becomes in 2011 the world's most popular open source hosting site, after in the previous decade attaining the title of the world's most popular Git hosting site.

== Physics ==
- 2012: The Higgs boson is discovered, completing the discovery of particles of the Standard Model.
- 2016: Gravitational waves are detected for the first time.

== Robotics and machine learning ==
- In 2019, a robot is developed at MIT that can do multiple experiments in fluid dynamics at high speed.

== Biology ==
=== Organisms ===
- Researchers at Harvard report the creation of "cyborg organoids", which consist of 3D organoids grown from stem cells, with embedded sensors to measure activity in the developmental process.

=== Genetics ===
- In 2019, Scientists announce a new form of DNA, named Hachimoji DNA, composed of four natural and four unnatural nucleobases. Benefits of such an eight-base DNA system may include an enhanced ability to store digital data, as well as insights into what may be possible in the search for extraterrestrial life.
- In 2019, Scientists report that the purportedly first-ever germline genetically edited humans, the twin babies Lulu and Nana, by Chinese researcher He Jiankui, may have inadvertently (or perhaps, intentionally) had their brains enhanced.
- In 2019, Researchers design an inhalable form of messenger RNA aerosol that could be administered directly to the lungs to help treat diseases such as cystic fibrosis.

=== Medicine ===
- In 2019, medical scientists announce that iridium attached to albumin, creating a photosensitized molecule, can penetrate cancer cells and, after being irradiated with light (a process called photodynamic therapy), destroy the cancer cells.

== Gallery ==
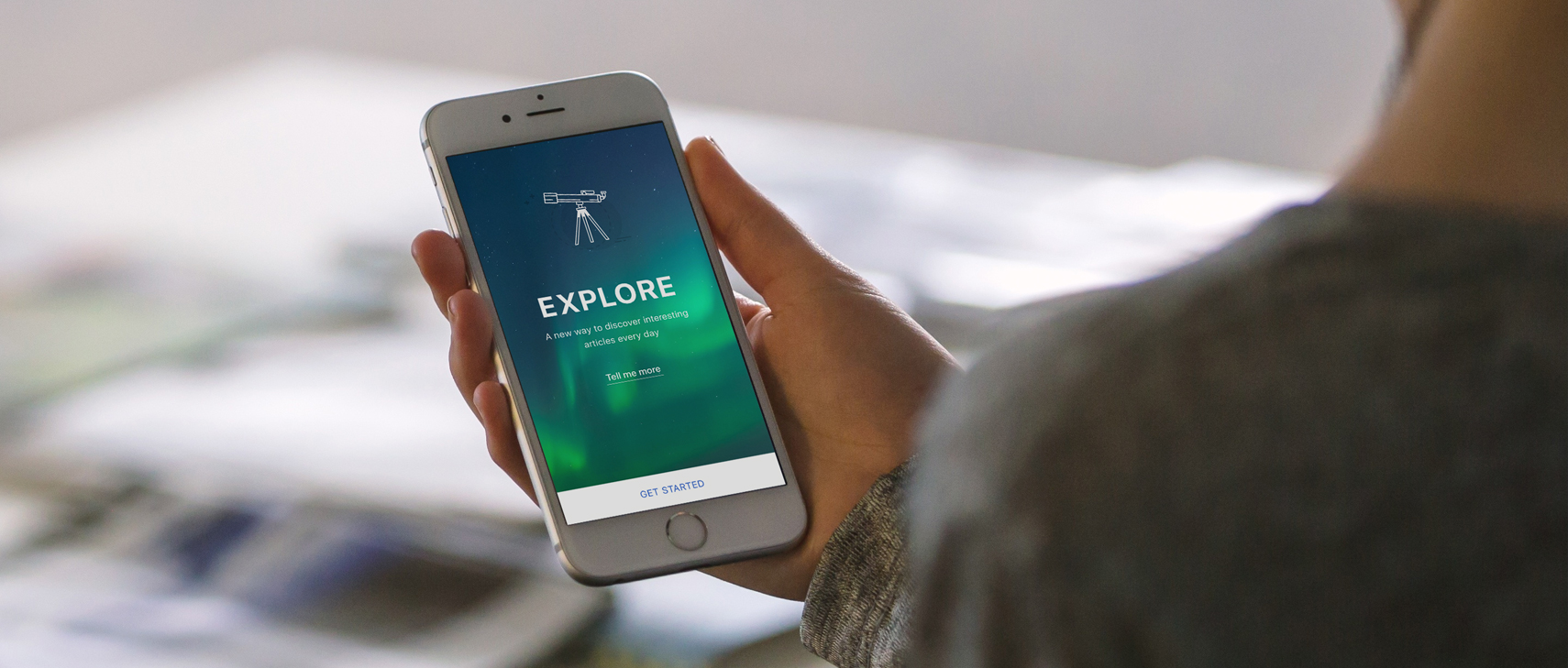
Smartphones, tablets, and other IoT devices surged in popularity during the 2010s, allowing easy access to the internet and mass media via mobile apps, social networking, and videotelephony. Growing sophistication and prevalence of IoT devices also spawned new debates over privacy, censorship, and over-dependence.

Over the course of the decade virtual assistant devices/apps enter the market.

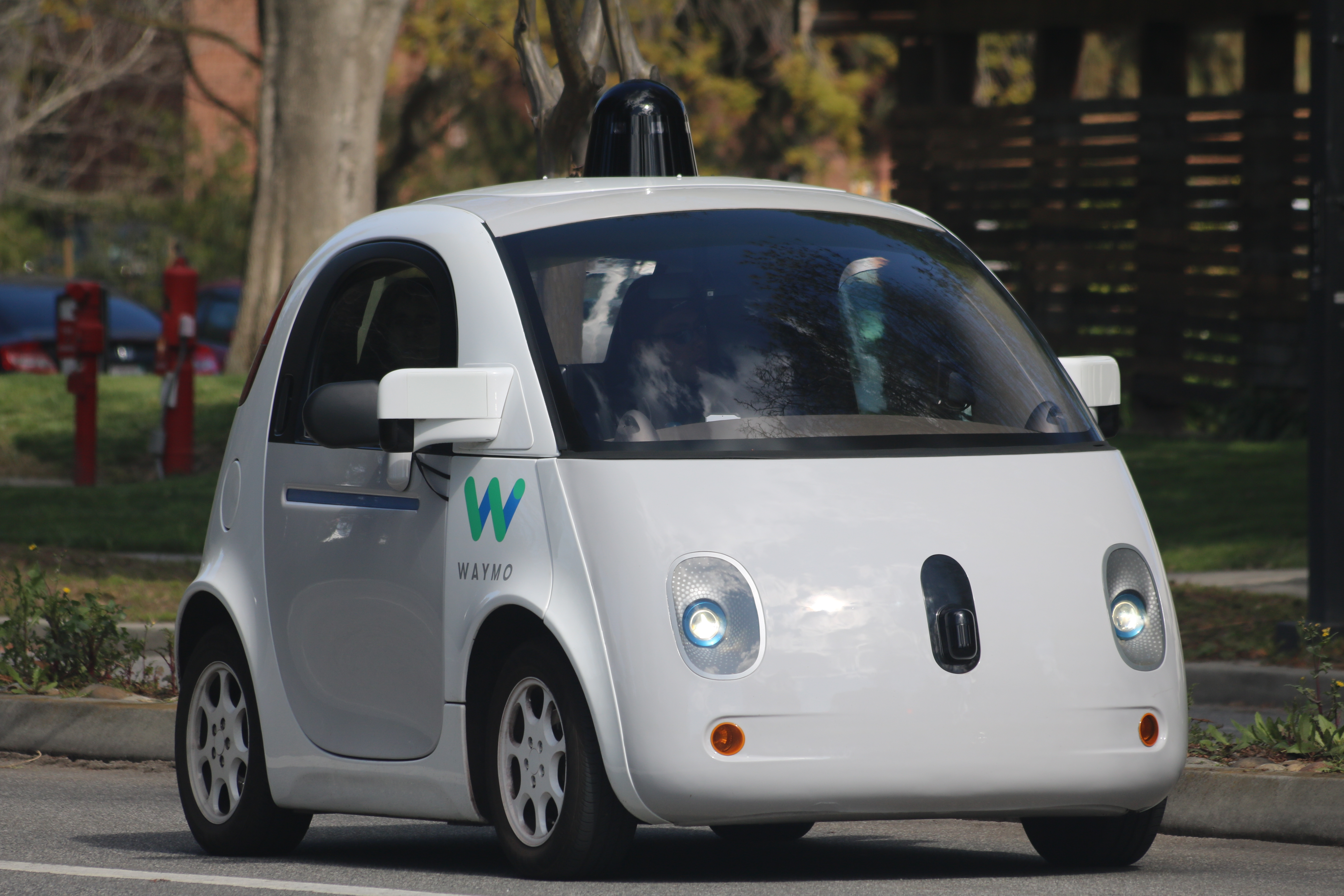
Google's autonomous car Waymo

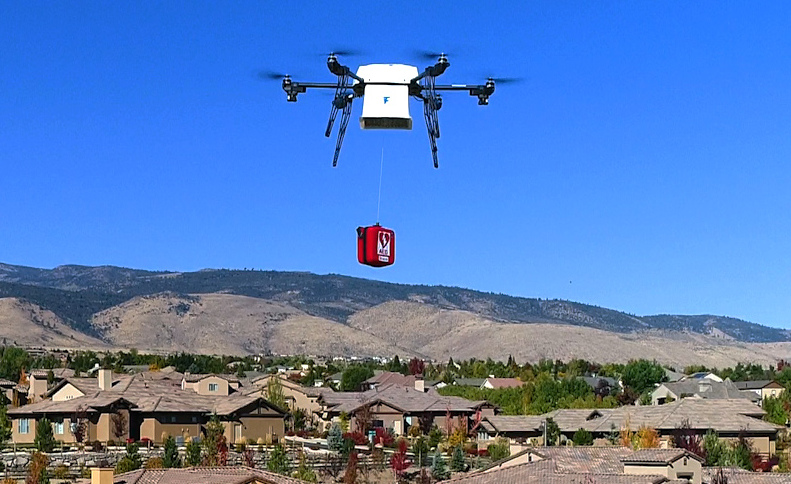
A drone used to make deliveries

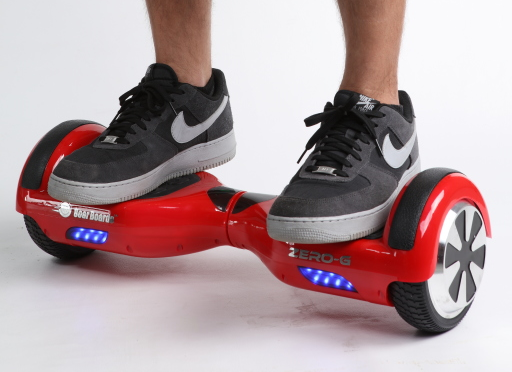
The self-balancing scooter, invented in 2013 by the American inventor Shane Chen, became popular in the middle of the decade.

During the decade there was a significant increase in the sales of home 3D printers.

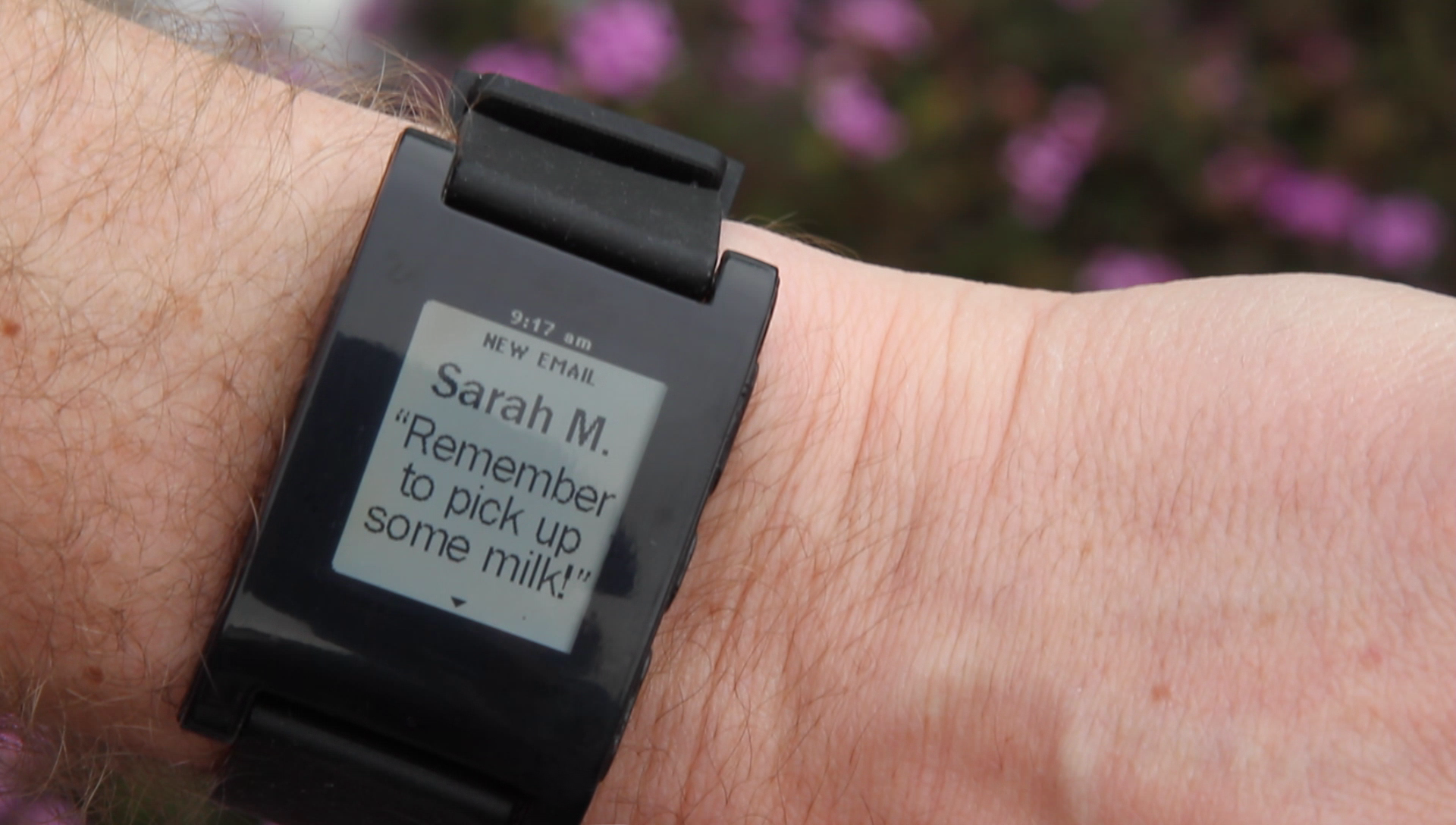
A smartwatch displaying an email message

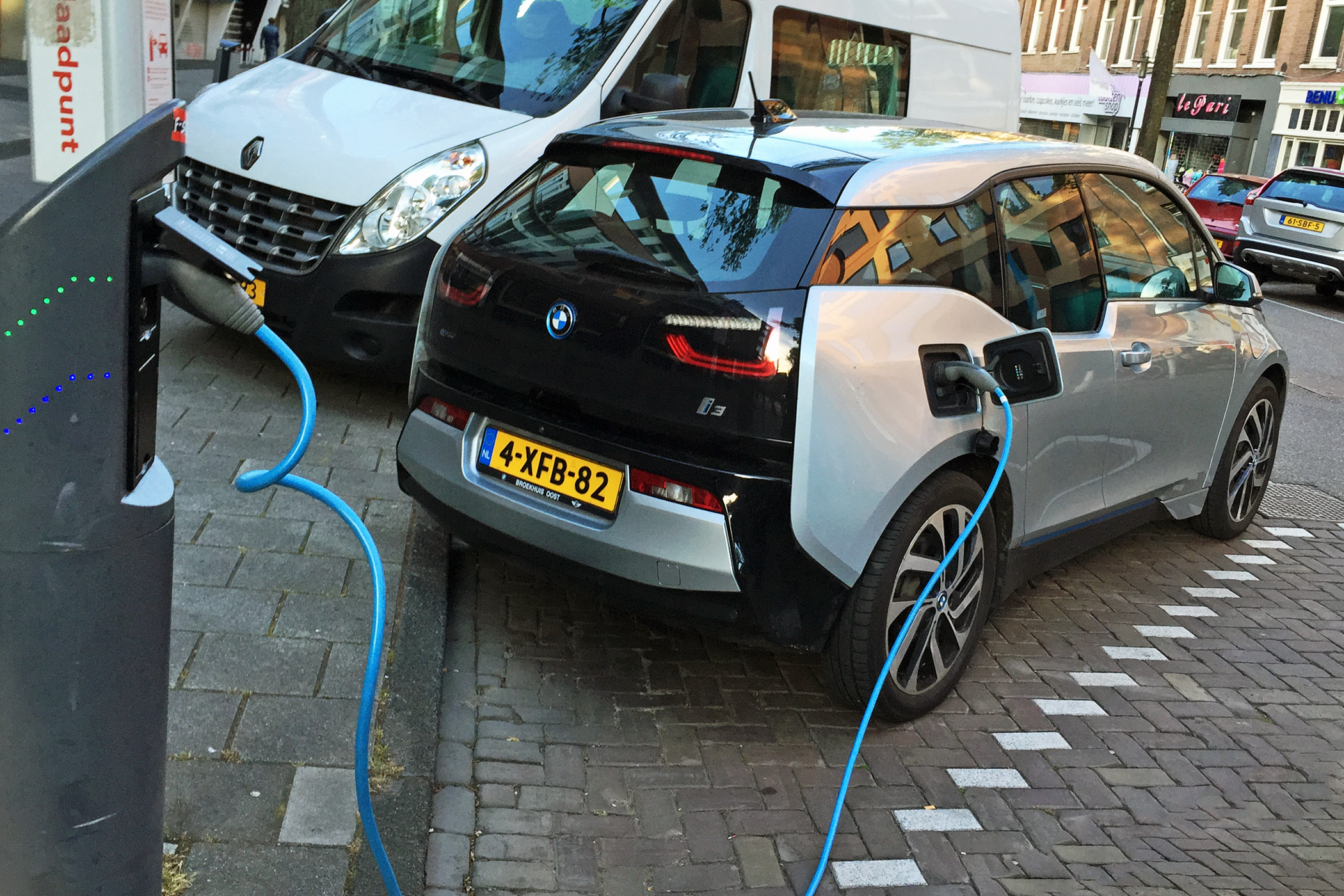
Electric and hybrid vehicles started becoming popular in many countries in the Western world during the decade.

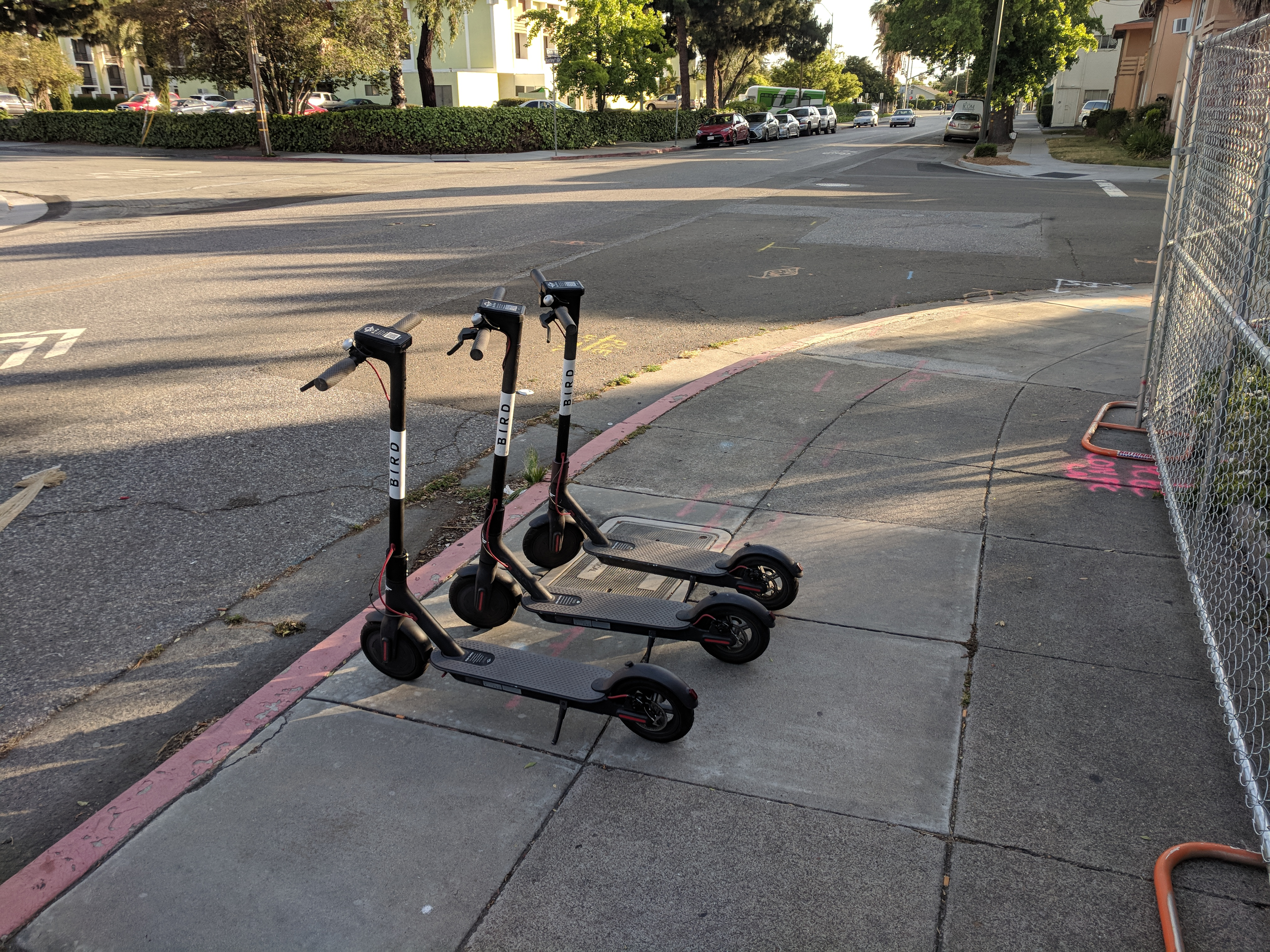
Electric kick scooters saw a resurgence in popularity in the later half of the decade thanks to scooter-sharing services, part of a larger trend of shared mobility in Asia and the Western world.

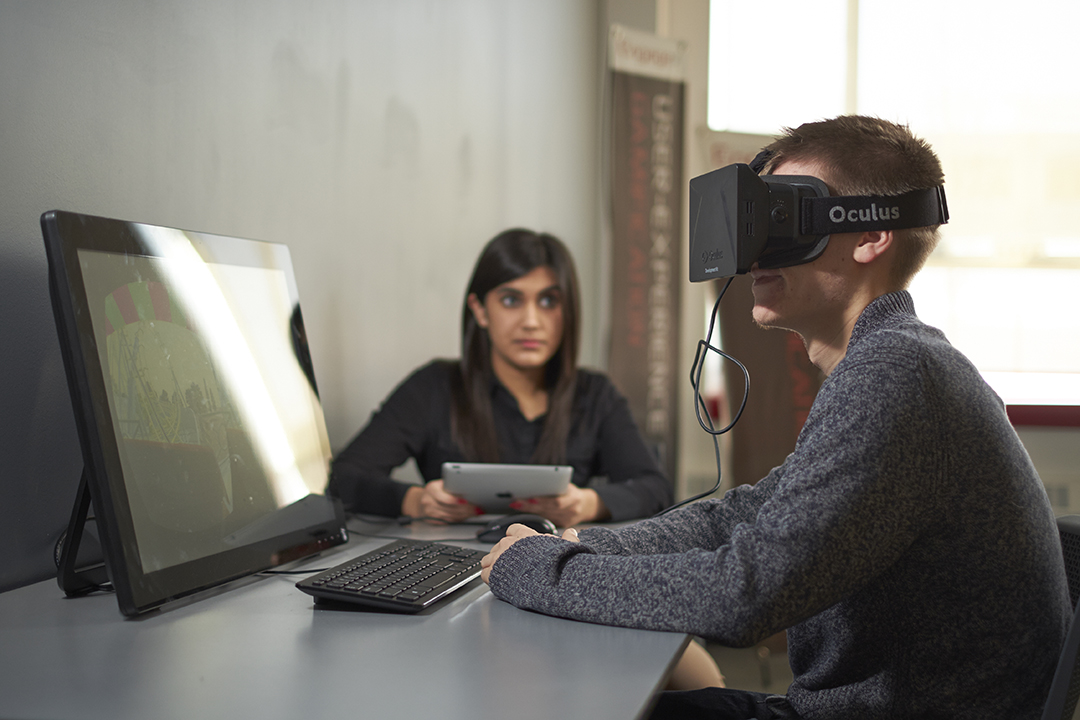
Virtual reality headset

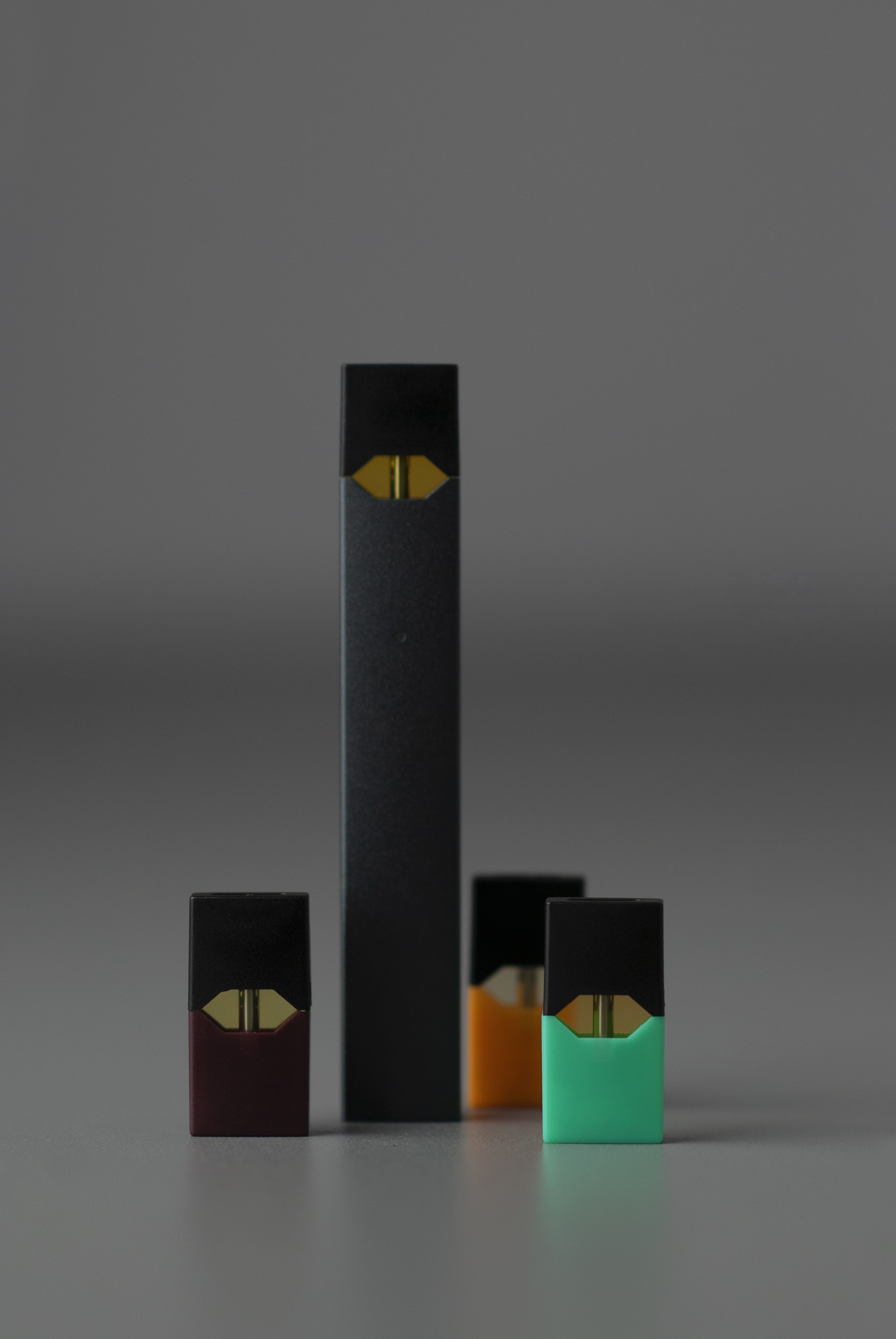
E-cigarettes (Juul pods in image) saw a surge in popularity in the 2010s.

Total cost of sequencing a whole human genome greatly reduced, as calculated by the NHGRI.

== See also ==
- Timeline of computing 2010–19
- History of science and technology
- List of science and technology articles by continent
- List of years in science
