= 2010s in comics =

- 2000s
- 2010s in comics
- 2020s
Other topics in 2010s:
- Anthropology
- Fashion
- Motorsport
- Music
- Science and technology
- Sociology
- Television
- Video games
