= 2020s in video games =

- 2010s
- 2020s in video games
Other topics in 2020s:
- Comics
- Fashion
- Motorsport
- Music
- Science and technology
- Television

The 2020s is the sixth decade in the industry's history. The industry remains heavily dominated by the actions of Nintendo, Sony, and Microsoft, but it remains unforeseen how their dominance will be affected by cloud gaming and the smartphone and tablet market. Virtual reality headsets are expected to become more popular over the course of the decade. The industry was heavily impacted by the COVID-19 pandemic. The ninth generation of video game consoles went on sale, beginning with the Xbox Series X and Series S and the PlayStation 5 (PS5). Notable games released in the 2020s included Animal Crossing: New Horizons, Doom Eternal, Final Fantasy VII Remake, The Last of Us Part II, Ghost of Tsushima, Fall Guys, Hades, Genshin Impact, Marvel's Spider-Man: Miles Morales, Cyberpunk 2077, It Takes Two, Ratchet & Clank: Rift Apart, Resident Evil Village, Metroid Dread, Valorant, Forza Horizon 5, Horizon Forbidden West, Elden Ring, Kirby and the Forgotten Land, Stray, Xenoblade Chronicles 3, Cult of the Lamb, God of War Ragnarök, Sonic Frontiers, Bayonetta 3, Pokémon Scarlet and Violet, Hi-Fi Rush, Resident Evil 4 (2023), The Legend of Zelda: Tears of the Kingdom, Mortal Kombat 1, Street Fighter 6, Baldur's Gate 3, Starfield, Super Mario Bros. Wonder, Marvel's Spider-Man 2, Alan Wake 2, Cyberpunk 2077: Phantom Liberty, Tekken 8, Final Fantasy VII Rebirth, Helldivers 2, Elden Ring Shadow of the Erdtree, Black Myth: Wukong, Astro Bot, Metaphor: ReFantazio, Marvel Rivals, Balatro, The Legend of Zelda: Echoes of Wisdom, Split Fiction, Clair Obscur: Expedition 33, Death Stranding 2: On the Beach, Ghost of Yōtei, Arc Raiders, Metroid Prime 4: Beyond, Pokémon Legends: Z-A, Mario Kart World, Donkey Kong Bananza, Hollow Knight: Silksong, Resident Evil: Requiem, and Grand Theft Auto VI. Game development companies have come under increasing criticism for "crunch" practices, forcing workers to work long hours in the build-up to release.

== Consoles of the 2020s ==
=== Eighth generation consoles (2012–present) ===
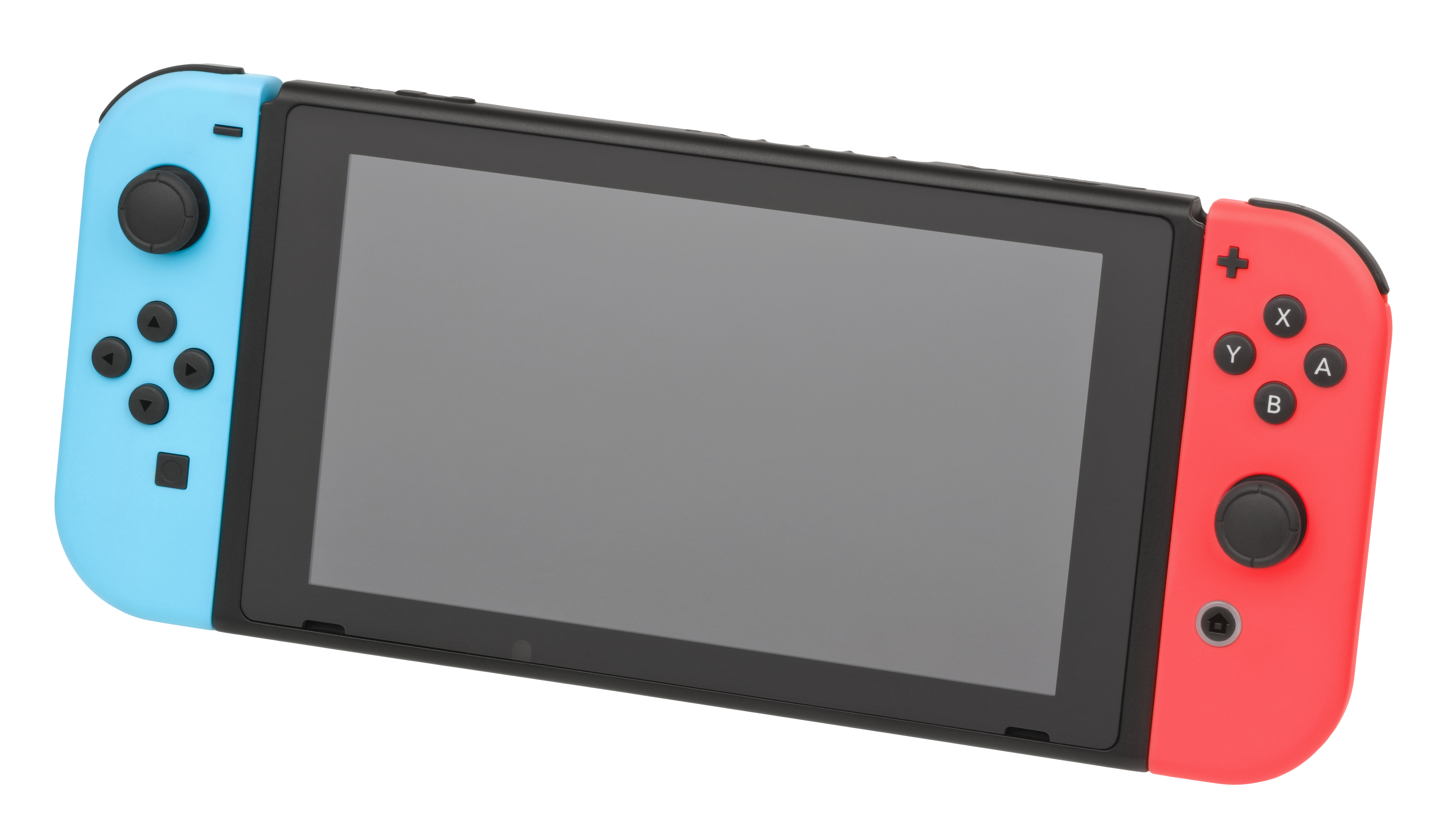
Nintendo Switch

The eighth generation of video game consoles, including the Nintendo Switch, PlayStation 4 (PS4), and Xbox One, remain in widespread use. Cloud gaming services like Google Stadia and Amazon Luna are also part of the eighth generation. The Xbox One and Nintendo 3DS were both discontinued in 2020. Stadia was shut down in 2023.

=== Ninth generation consoles (2020–present) ===
The ninth generation of video game consoles began with the release of the Xbox Series X, Series S, and PlayStation 5 in November 2020. The ninth generation offers faster computation and graphics processors, support for real-time ray tracing graphics, output for 4K resolution, and in some cases, 8K resolution, with rendering speeds targeting 60 frames per second (fps) or higher. Internally, both console families introduced new internal solid-state drive (SSD) systems to be used as high-throughput memory and storage systems for games to reduce or eliminate loading times and support in-game streaming. Standalone virtual reality headsets have also emerged with new entries in the Meta Quest line, HTC Vive XR Elite, and Apple Vision Pro all being introduced in the decade. The Nintendo Switch 2, a successor to the Switch, was released in most territories on June 5, 2025.

== History ==
At the beginning of decade many events were severely impacted by the coronavirus pandemic of 2020 through 2022. One early example in 2020 was the cancellation of that year's edition of the Electronic Entertainment Expo (E3). Summer Game Fest would emerge as a successor to E3, as the brand was retired in 2023. Additionally, competitive gaming continued to gain mainstream appeal in the decade as the International Olympic Committee (IOC) announced the creation of the Olympic Esports Games and Saudi Arabia held the 2024 Esports World Cup (EWC). There were setbacks however, as both the Overwatch League (OWL) and Major League Gaming (MLG) ceased operations.

=== 2020 ===
The COVID-19 pandemic—which saw rapid spread in 2020—significantly impacted the video game industry. Most video game development studios shifted to remote work in order to continue production through pandemic lockdowns. Many games were delayed as a result of changed working conditions, though delays increased in the years following. The lockdowns also caused increased interest and participation in online gaming, player spending on microtransactions, viewership of video game live streaming, a general spike in video game sales, and served as an introduction to video games as a whole for many. The World Health Organization (WHO) recommended video games as both a distraction from the pandemic and a method to connect with friends and family while practicing social distancing, and roughly half of those who play video games reported increased playtime during the pandemic and considered the activity a source of stress relief and distraction. Games such as Animal Crossing: New Horizons were praised for offering an "escape" from the pandemic, and the rises in popularity for games such as Among Us were credited to the pandemic shutdowns.

=== 2021 ===
The COVID-19 pandemic continued to make development difficult for many studios, however some had adapted well enough to the change. Games such as Hogwarts Legacy, Horizon Forbidden West, and God of War: Ragnarok were delayed past 2021 because of this. Additionally, Valve's Steam Deck was delayed into 2022. Gaming continued to gain popularity as platforms such as Steam reached record numbers. Chip shortages caused the price of hardware to increase, particularity around graphics cards, not helped by some choosing to buy and markup cards. Subscription based models such as Xbox Game Pass and Nintendo Switch Online increased in popularity, allowing customers to pay a monthly fee for a wide selection of games.

=== 2022 ===
Microsoft announced its intention to acquire Activision Blizzard for $68.7 billion on January 18. In response to the 2022 Russian invasion of Ukraine, multiple video game companies suspended sales and operations in Russia and Belarus. A wave of mass layoffs in the industry began in 2022.

== Notable video games of the decade ==
=== Notable franchises established in the 2020s ===
- Atomic Heart (2023)
- Black Myth (2024)
- Cyberpunk 2077 (2020)
- Elden Ring (2022)
- Fall Guys (2020)
- Genshin Impact (2020)
- Ghost of Tsushima (2020)
- Grounded (2022)
- Hades (2020)
- Hi-Fi Rush (2023)
- Hogwarts Legacy (2023)^{1}
- Kena (2021)
- Pokémon Legends (2022)^{2}
- Stellar Blade (2024)
- Wo Long (2023)

Notes:

- ^{1}Game franchises that also accompany major film or television franchises.
- ^{2}Game franchises that are considered spin-offs of previously established franchises.

=== Highest-grossing games ===
As of December 2025:

- Animal Crossing: New Horizons (2020) — 48,190,000 units sold
- Hogwarts Legacy (2023)
- Elden Ring (2022)
- Cyberpunk 2077 (2020)
- Call of Duty: Black Ops Cold War (2020)
- Call of Duty: Vanguard (2021)
- Black Myth: Wukong (2024)
- Pokémon Scarlet / Violet (2022)
- Phasmophobia (2020)
- It Takes Two (2021)

== In popular culture ==
=== Film ===
Films based on video games in the decade include:

- A trilogy of films (2020, 2022, 2024) based on Sonic the Hedgehog.
- Pokémon the Movie: Secrets of the Jungle (2020), based on the Pokémon franchise.
- Monster Hunter (2020), based on the Monster Hunter franchise.
- Mortal Kombat (2021), based on the Mortal Kombat franchise. Received a sequel in 2026.
- Werewolves Within (2021), based on Werewolves Within, a 2016 multiplayer social-deduction VR game.
- Deemo: Memorial Keys (2021), based on the rhythm game Deemo.
- Dynasty Warriors (2021), based on the Dynasty Warriors franchise.
- Resident Evil: Welcome to Raccoon City (2021), based on the Resident Evil franchise.
- Uncharted (2022), based on the Uncharted franchise.
- Gran Turismo (2023), based on the Gran Turismo franchise.
- The Super Mario Bros. Movie (2023), animated film based on the Super Mario franchise.
- Tetris (2023), a biopic will explore the rights battle that surrounded Tetris.
- Five Nights at Freddy's (2023), a supernatural horror film based on the Five Nights at Freddy's franchise.
- Borderlands (2024), science fiction action comedy based on the Borderlands games.
- Until Dawn (2025), a supernatural horror film based on Until Dawn (2015).
- A Minecraft Movie (2025), a comedy based on the Minecraft universe.
- Five Nights At Freddy's 2 (2025), a sequel to Five Nights At Freddy's and also a supernatural horror film based on the Five Nights at Freddy's franchise.
- The Super Mario Galaxy Movie (2026), a animated film that is based on Super Mario Galaxy and a sequel to The Super Mario Bros. Movie (2023).
- Street Fighter (2026) based on the Street Fighter franchise.

=== Television ===
Television series based on video games in the decade include:

- Dota: Dragon's Blood (2021–2022), animated series based on Dota 2.
- Arcane (2021–2024), animated series based on League of Legends.
- Cyberpunk: Edgerunners (2022), animated series based on Cyberpunk 2077.
- The Cuphead Show! (2022), animated series based on Cuphead.
- Tekken: Bloodline (2022), animated series based on the Tekken series.
- Sonic Prime (2022–2024), animated series.
- The Last of Us (2023–present), live-action series based on The Last of Us.
- Fallout (2024–present), live-action series based on Fallout
- Halo (2022–2024), live-action series based on Halo

== Hardware timeline ==
The following gallery highlights hardware used to predominantly play games throughout the 2020s.

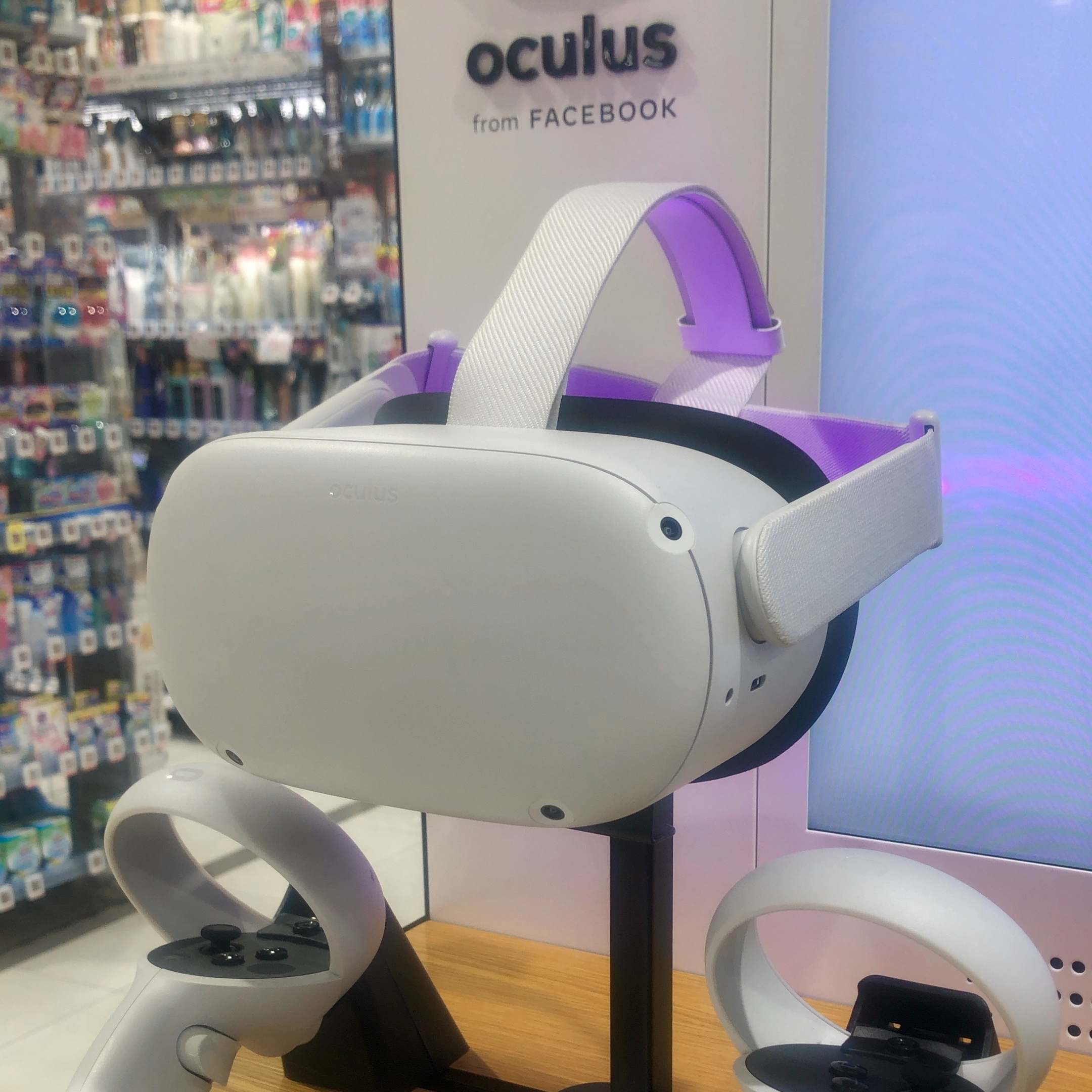
Quest 2 (2020)

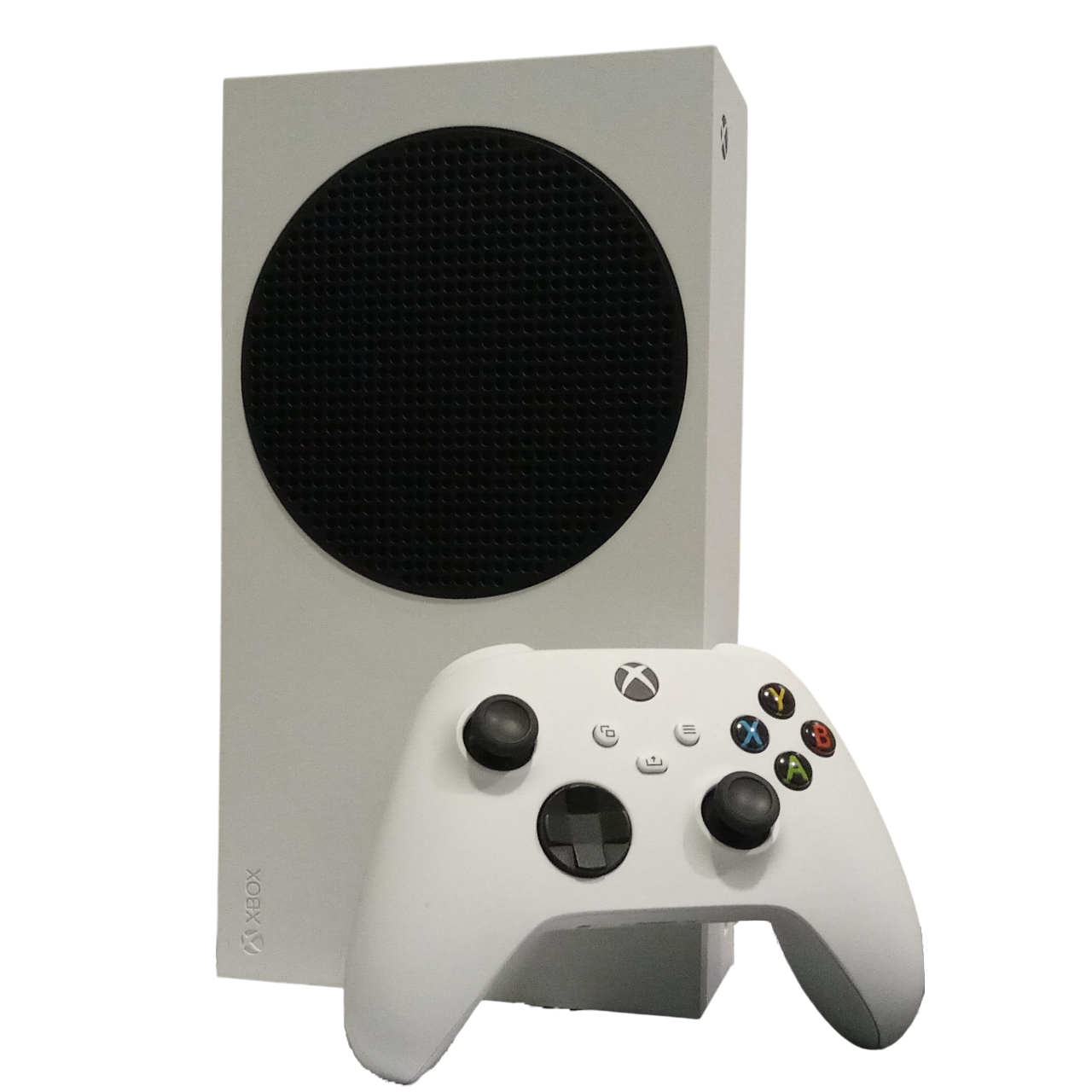
Xbox Series S (2020)

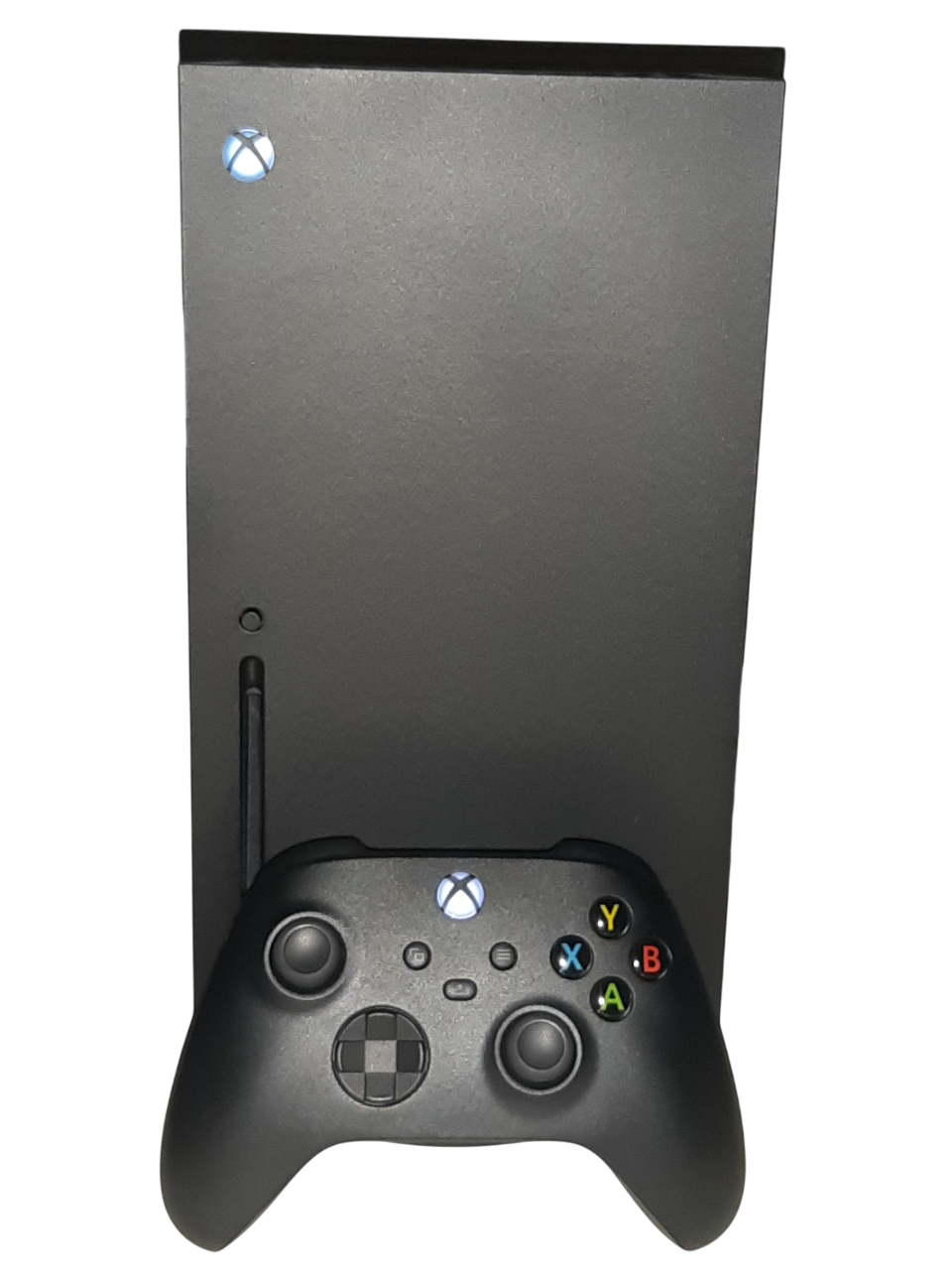
Xbox Series X (2020)

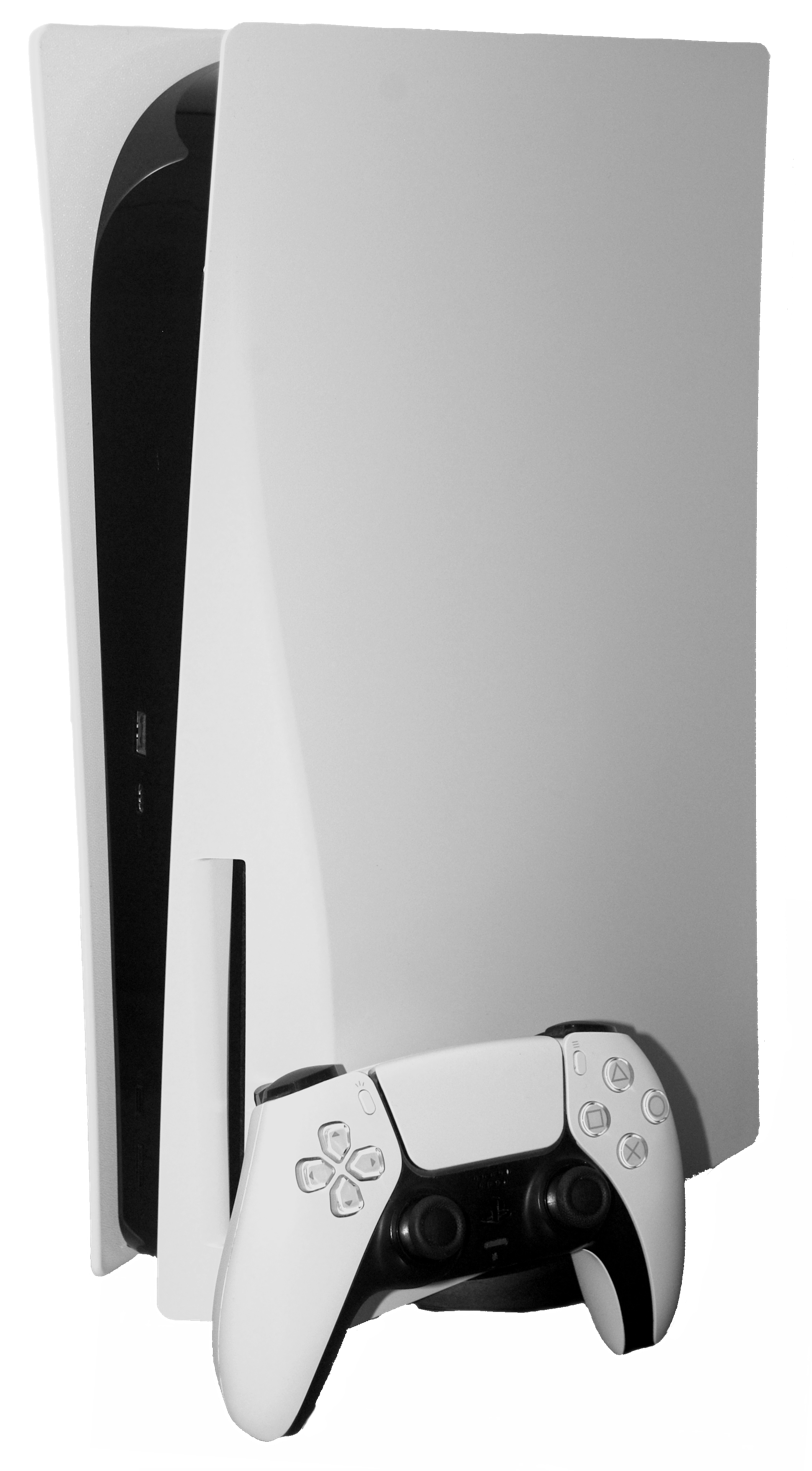
PlayStation 5 (2020)

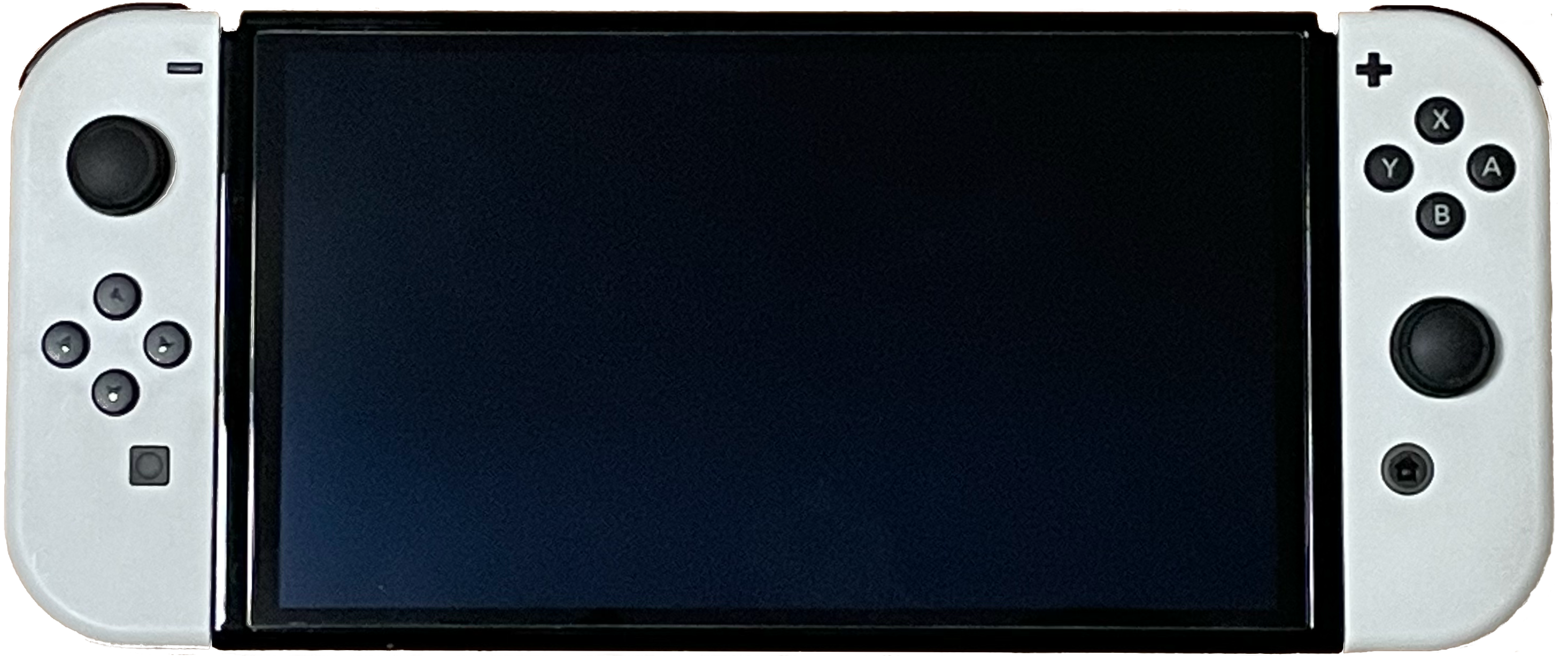
Nintendo Switch OLED (2021)

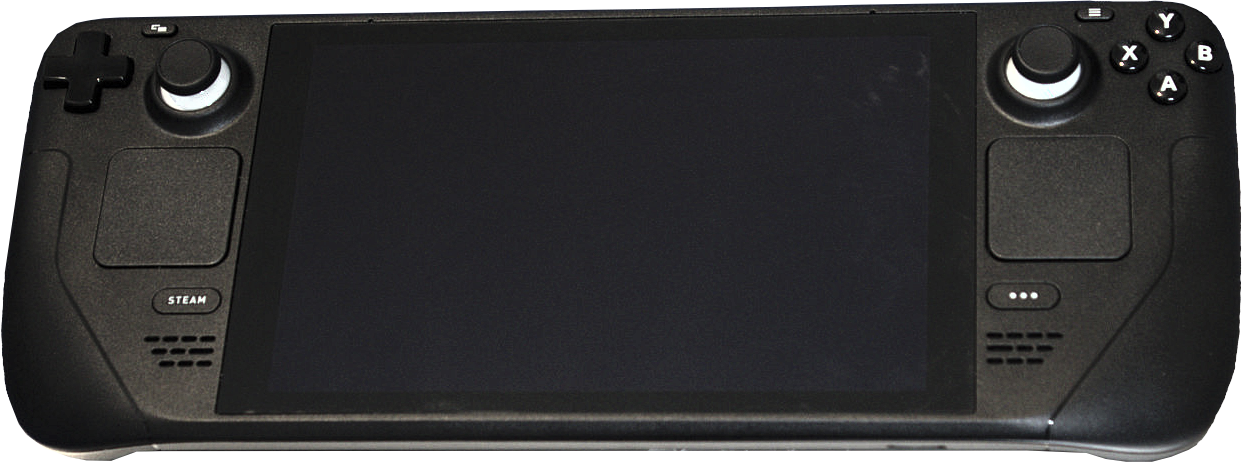
Steam Deck (2022)

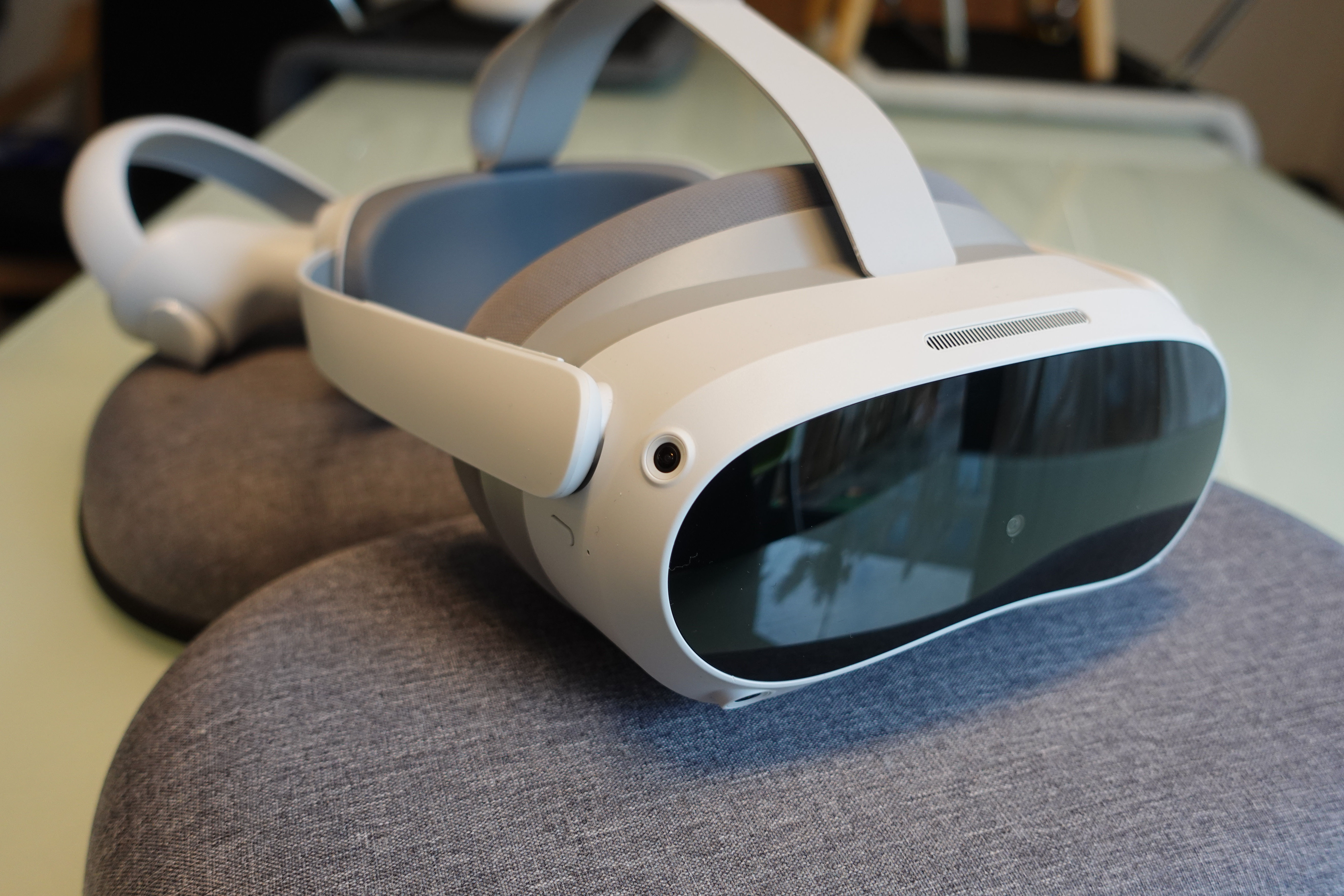
PICO 4 (2022)

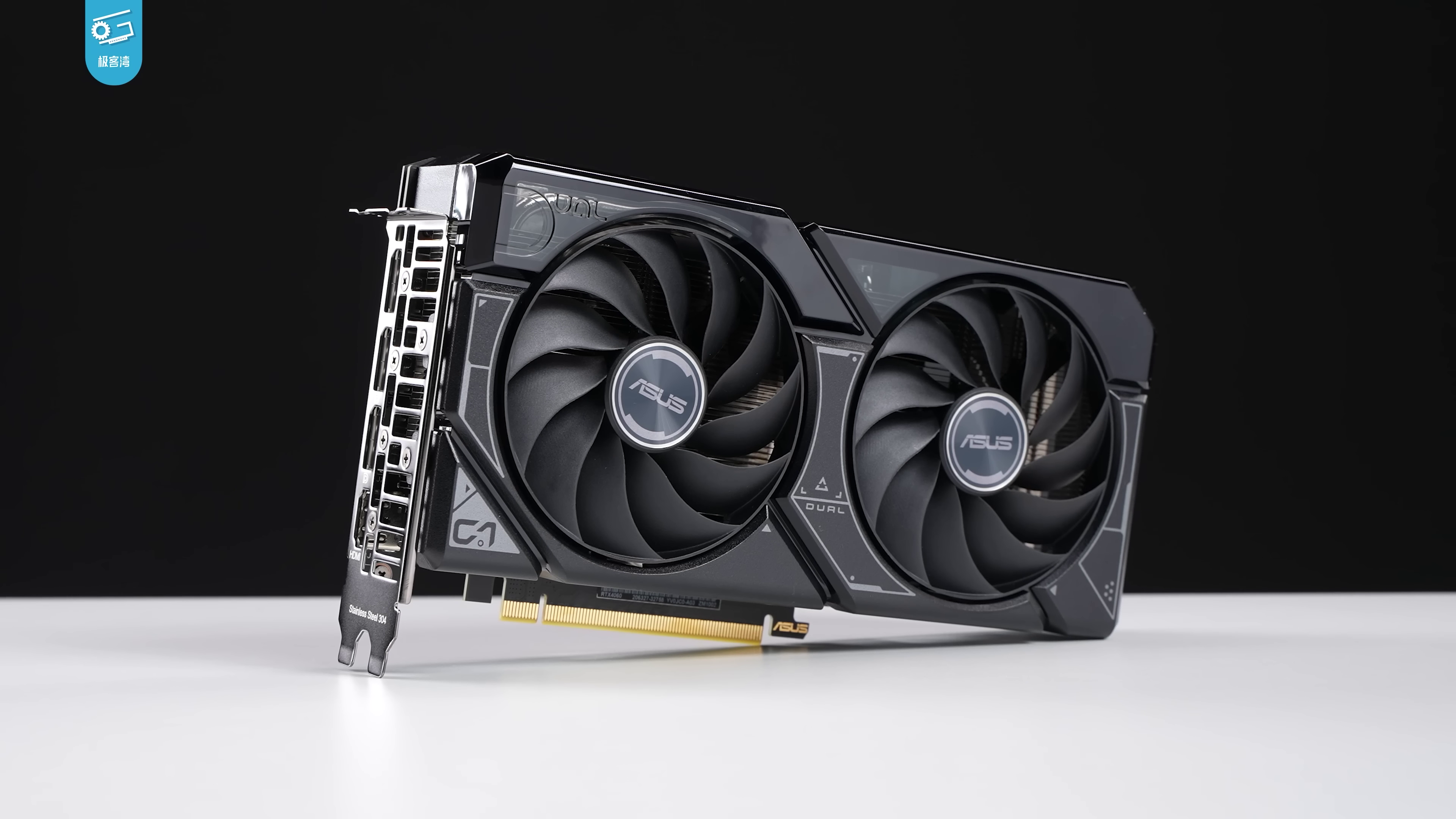
NVIDIA GeForce RTX 4060 (2022) one the most popular video cards used for gaming PC's during the decade

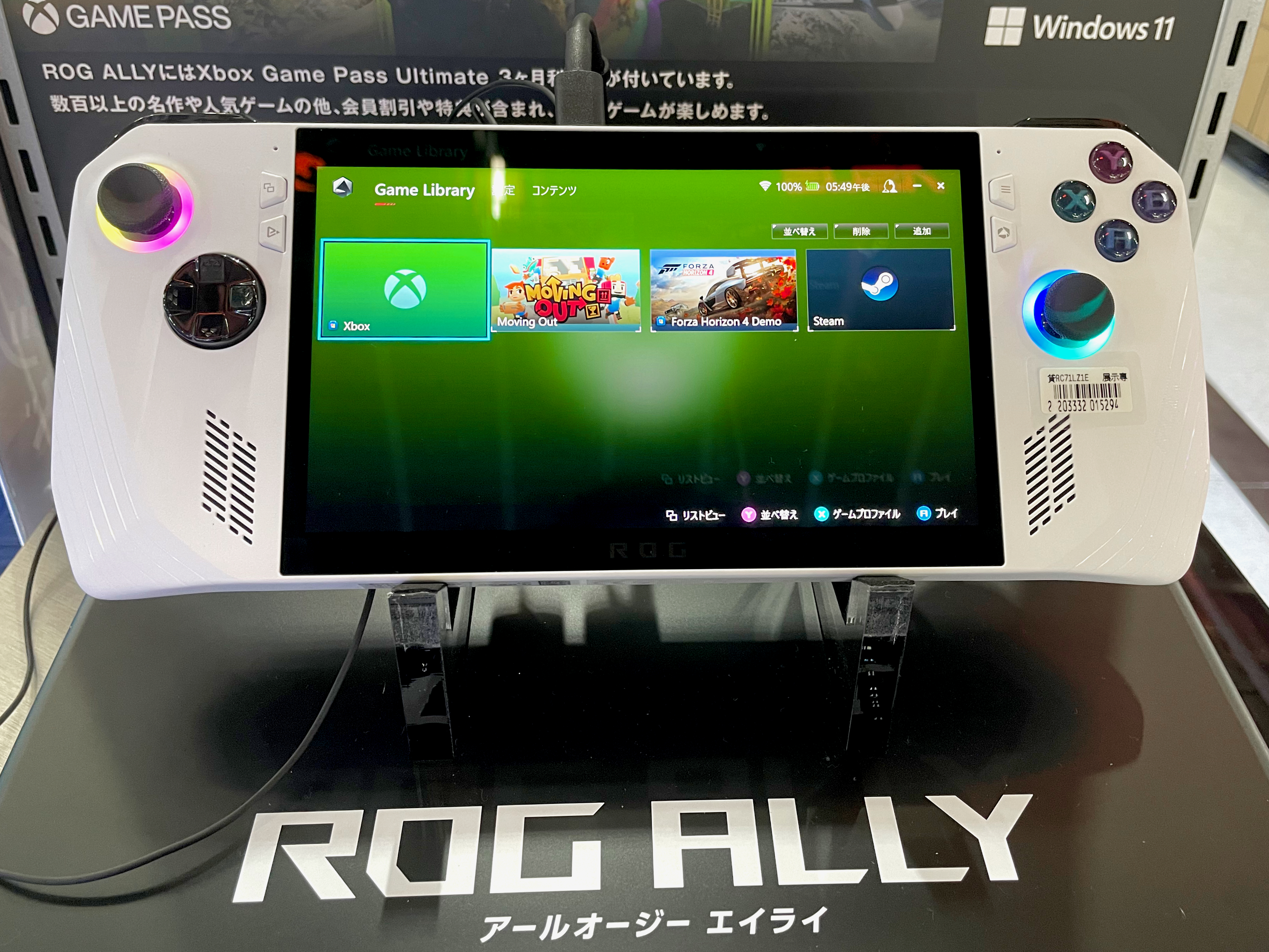
Asus ROG Ally (2023)

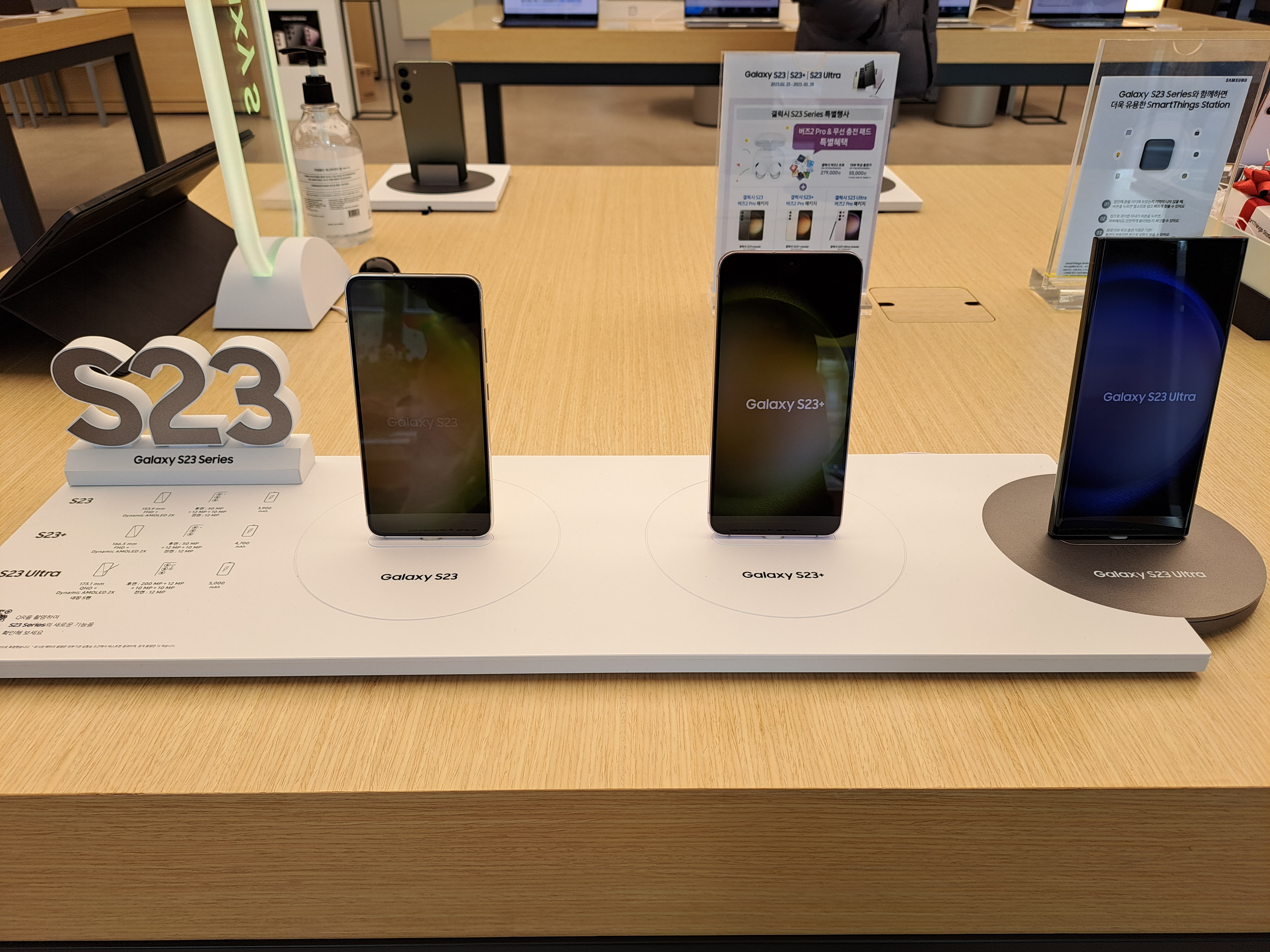
Tablets and smartphones (Samsung Galaxy S23 series pictured) would be widely used to play mobile games which now form the largest sector in the gaming industry

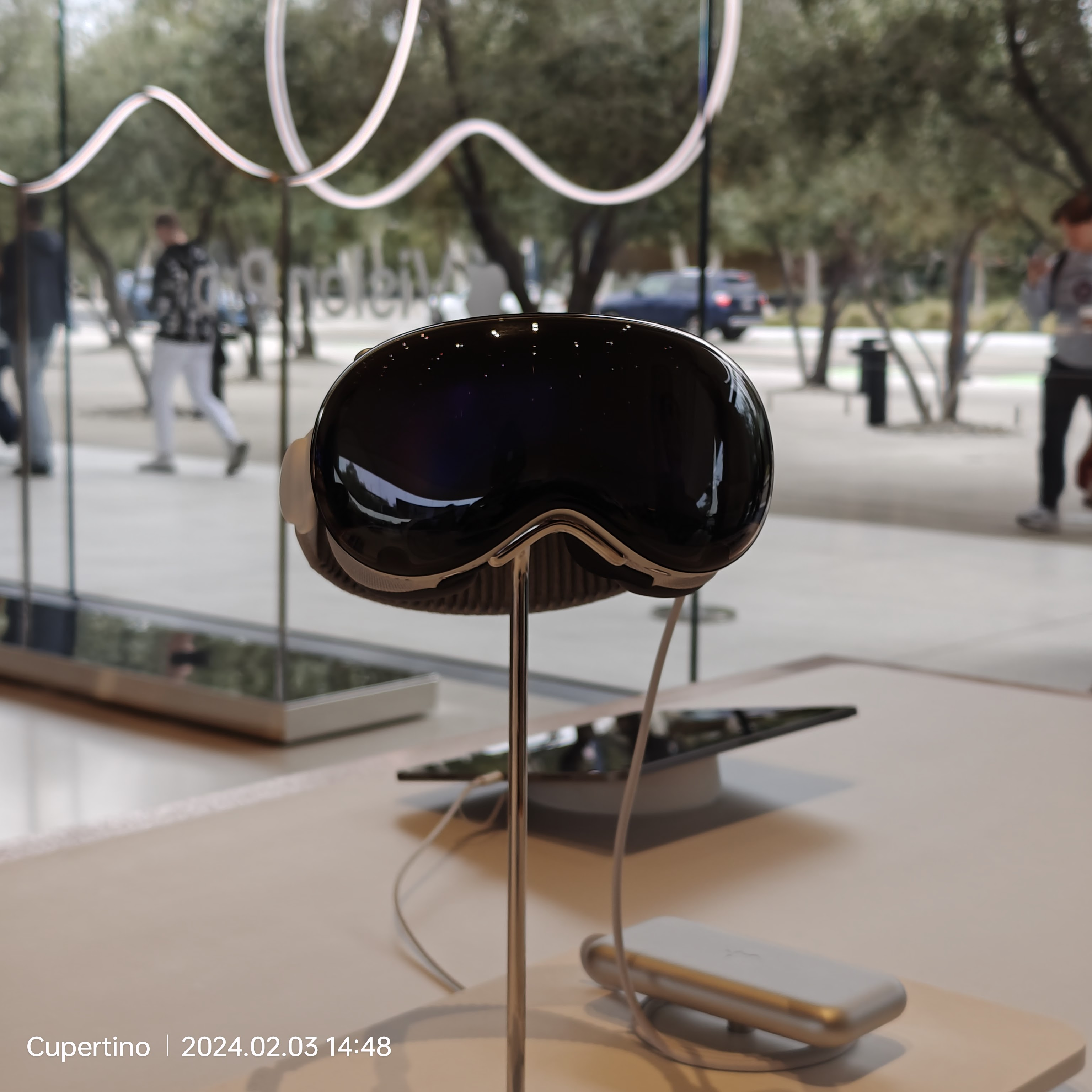
Apple Vision Pro (2024)

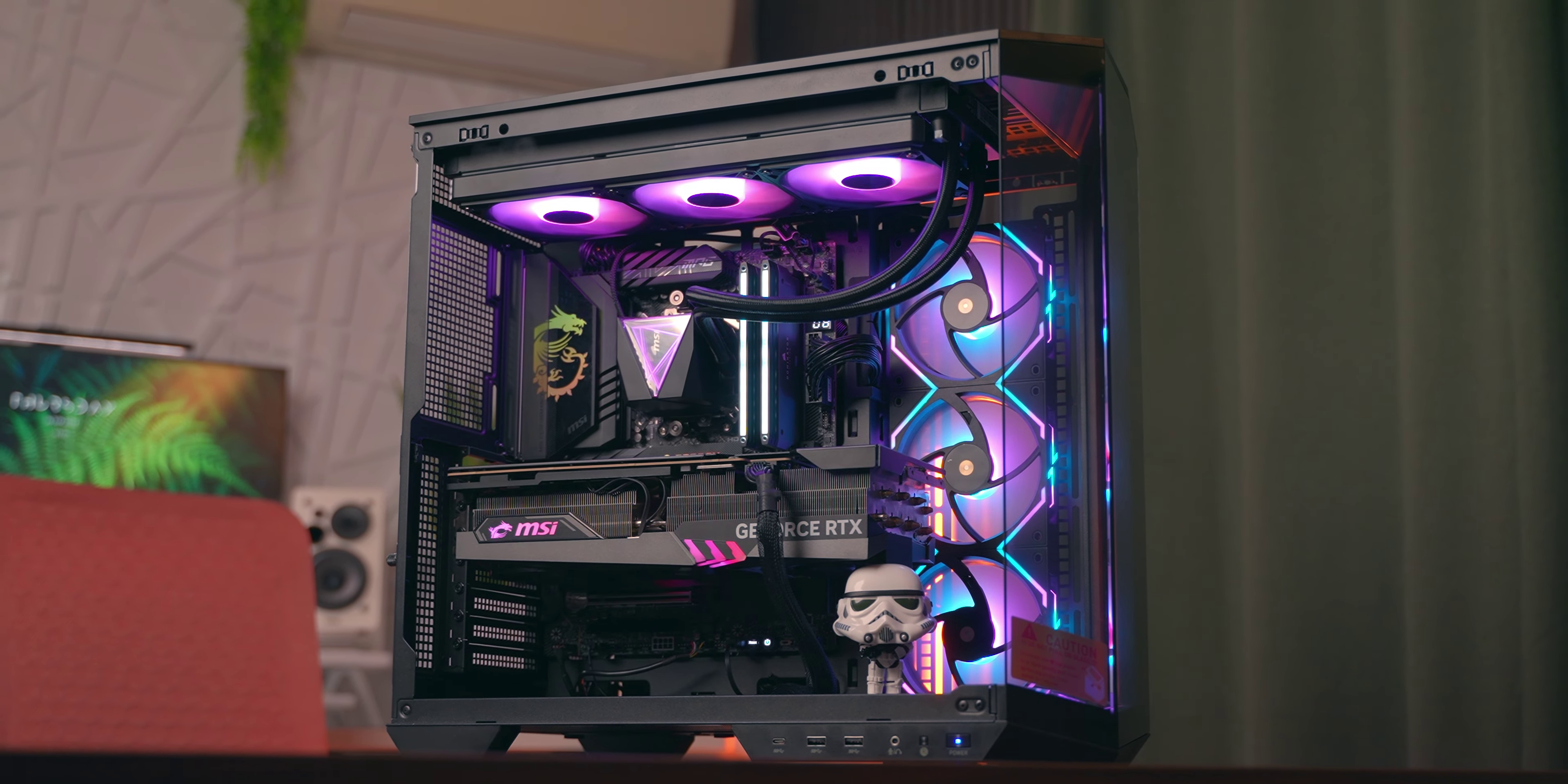
A 2020s custom built desktop gaming PC with MSI manufactured hardware

A 2020s laptop gaming PC manufactured by MSI

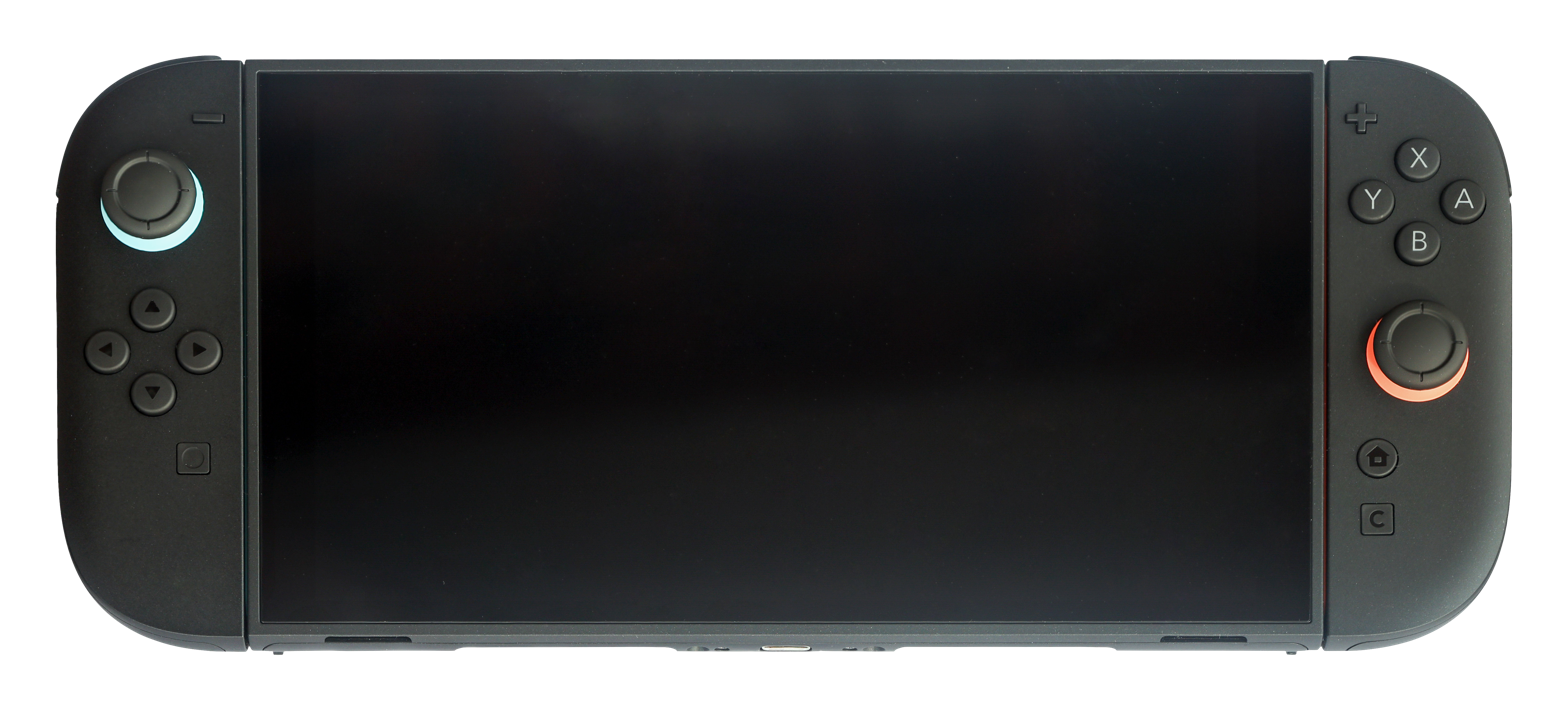
Nintendo Switch 2 (2025)
