= 2020s in comics =

- 2010s
- 2020s in comics
Other topics in 2020s:
- Fashion
- Motorsport
- Music
- Science and technology
- Television
- Video games
