= 2010s in motorsport =

- 2000s
- 2010s in motorsport
- 2020s
Other topics in 2010s:
- Anthropology
- Comics
- Fashion
- Music
- Science and technology
- Sociology
- Television
- Video games

The 2010s saw several notable changes in motorsport.

== North America ==
- The United States Grand Prix returns after a four year hiatus. Its new venue is Circuit of the Americas.
- The Rolex Sports Car Series and American Le Mans Series merge in 2014 to form the IMSA SportsCar Championship.
- The IndyCar event at Watkins Glen International is held on-and-off before being ultimately dropped in 2018.
- The IndyCar Series abandons its event at Sonoma Raceway after fifteen years for an event at WeatherTech Raceway Laguna Seca. It is their first event there since 2004.
- In 2012 Chevrolet was added as a second engine in the IndyCar Series, accompanying Honda. Lotus was also a supplier but was shortlived. This was the first time in many years that IndyCar had more than one supplier.
- The IndyCar Series introduces the Grand Prix of Indianapolis on the Indianapolis Motor Speedway road course. It is held as a doubleheader with the Indianapolis 500 until 2021 when a second road course event is added.
- The SCCA Pro Racing World Challenge completely reformats, with three categories instead of the two which had been the standard for years. The old touring car category becomes GTS and a new TC category based on the Continental Tire Sports Car Challenge is created with much better variety, the old one being dominated by three brands for years.
- Haas F1 was created as the only current Formula One team headquartered in the United States.
- The Dodge Charger replaces the Dodge Avenger as the vehicle of choice for Dodge in NASCAR
- The Dodge Viper is discontinued

== Europe ==
- The drag reduction system is introduced in Formula One
- The Austrian Grand Prix returns in 2014 after eleven years.
- The French Grand Prix returns in 2018 after ten years. It is held at Circuit Paul Ricard instead of the previous Magny-Cours.
- The Russian Grand Prix debuts. It is held until 2022, when it is canceled indefinitely due to the Russian invasion of Ukraine.
- Lotus returns to F1 after about fifteen years. They are quickly purchased by Renault and are defunct after 2015.
- Brumos Porsche folds after about fifty years. It is tributed in 2019 by Porsche Racing using similar livery for IMSA's fiftieth anniversary.
- Porsche Racing breaks Audi's dominance at the 24 Hours of Le Mans, beginning their own dynasty. It lasts until 2018 when Toyota Gazoo Racing begins their dynasty which has lasted to this date.
- Formula One champion Max Verstappen debuted

== Asia ==
- The Indian Grand Prix is held for three years.
- The Korean Grand Prix is held for four years.
- The Malaysian Grand Prix is dropped in 2018 after almost twenty years.
- The Acura NSX returns in 2016 after a hiatus of over a decade
- The Toyota Supra returns in 2019 after a hiatus of almost twenty years.
- The Indy Japan 300 is dropped from the IndyCar Series calendar in 2012. It is the final event outside North America. Due to an earthquake damaging the oval, the final event is held on the motorcycle circuit.

== Central America ==
- The Mexican Grand Prix is revived in 2015 after over twenty years. It is held until 2019, after which the 2020 event is canceled due to the COVID-19 pandemic. The event resumes the following year as the Mexico City Grand Prix.

== Middle East ==
- The Turkish Grand Prix is dropped in 2012. It does not return until 2020.
- The Azerbaijan Grand Prix debuts in 2017. It is held until 2020, when it is dropped due to COVID. It returns the following year.

== See also ==
- 2000s in motorsport
- 2020s in motorsport
