= 2020s in motorsport =

- 2010s
- 2020s in motorsport
Other topics in 2020s:
- Comics
- Fashion
- Music
- Science and technology
- Television
- Video games

The 2020s have brought several changes to motorsport throughout the world.

== North America ==
- The Miami Grand Prix debuts in 2022, marking the first time the United States has held more than one Formula One event since the eighties.
- The United States Grand Prix was dropped in 2020 but returned the following year.
- The Canadian Grand Prix was canceled in 2020 and did not return until 2022
- The Chevrolet Corvette is redesigned to be mid-engined for the first time.
- Ford Racing withdraws from the WeatherTech SportsCar Championship, leaving its Mustang as the only Ford model used in IMSA.
- The COVID-19 pandemic caused the cancelation of several IndyCar Series events
  - The IndyCar Monterey Grand Prix is canceled due to COVID in 2020, but returns the following year
  - The IndyCar Portland Grand Prix is canceled due to COVID in 2020, but returns the following year
  - The Indy Grand Prix of Alabama is canceled due to COVID in 2020, but returns the following year
  - The IndyCar Toronto Grand Prix is canceled due to COVID in 2020, but returns the following year
  - The IndyCar Long Beach Grand Prix is canceled due to COVID in 2020, but returns the following year
  - The Indianapolis 500 is closed to the public in 2020 due to COVID
  - The IndyCar Detroit Grand Prix is canceled in 2020 due to COVID, but returns the following year
- The IndyCar event at Pocono Raceway is canceled after seven years
- The IndyCar event at Circuit of the Americas is canceled after only one year
- The Music City Grand Prix debuts as an IndyCar Series event in Nashville, Tennessee
- The Detroit Grand Prix moves to a new layout in 2023
- The IndyCar event at Iowa Speedway is dropped for 2021, but returns the following year
- The Chevrolet Camaro is discontinued to rework it into an electric car, ending many years of its use in GT racing.
- NASCAR vehicles become more like IMSA cars, thus allowing NASCAR to become more open to road courses
- The Formula One Las Vegas Grand Prix debuts, using a street circuit instead of the casino parking lot course the

Caesars Palace Grand Prix used

- The Dodge Challenger is discontinued as Chrysler prepares to replace it with an electric version

== Central America ==
- The Mexican Grand Prix is renamed the Mexico City Grand Prix

== South America ==
- The Brazilian Grand Prix is renamed the São Paulo Grand Prix in 2021

== Middle East ==
- The Qatar Grand Prix debuts in 2021, but does not return for 2022 due to conflicts with Qatar hosting the FIFA World Cup It returns the following year.
- The Turkish Grand Prix returns in 2020 after nine years, but is not held in 2022

== Europe ==
- Due to the COVID-19 pandemic leading to the cancelations of several Formula One events, other venues are adopted as filler events.
  - The Styrian Grand Prix was adopted as a second event in Austria
  - The Emilia Romagna Grand Prix at Imola Circuit was added, reviving a venue not seen in about fifteen years. It is not called the San Marino Grand Prix due to San Marino not funding the event. It is canceled in 2023 due to flooding but returns the following year.
  - The Portuguese Grand Prix returned for the first time in 25 years. It was kept for 2021 and dropped after that.
  - The Eiffel Grand Prix was held as an event in Germany
  - The Sakhir Grand Prix was held as an event in Bahrain
  - The Tuscan Grand Prix was held as another event in Italy.
- The Dutch Grand Prix was revived in 2021 after a 36-year hiatus
- The German Grand Prix was dropped after 64 events
- The Monaco Grand Prix was dropped in 2020 due to COVID, but was revived the following year
- The French Grand Prix was dropped in 2020 due to COVID but returned the following year
- The Russian Grand Prix was dropped in 2023 due to the Russian invasion of Ukraine

== Asia ==
- The Japanese Grand Prix was dropped in 2020 due to COVID and did not return until 2022
- The Chinese Grand Prix was dropped after sixteen years. It returned in 2024.

== Australia ==
- The Camaro replaces the Holden Commodore in the V8 Supercars series.

== See also ==
- 2010s in motorsport
