= Elizabeth Brumfiel =

American archaeologist (1945–2012)

- Born: March 10, 1945; Chicago, Illinois, U.S.
- Died: January 1, 2012 (aged 66); Skokie, Illinois, U.S.
- Education: University of Michigan (BA, PhD); University of California, Los Angeles (MA)
- Scientific career
- Fields: Archaeology
- Institutions: Northwestern University; Albion College

Elizabeth M. Brumfiel (born Elizabeth Stern; March 10, 1945 – January 1, 2012) was an American archaeologist who taught at Northwestern University and Albion College. She had been a president of the American Anthropological Association.

== Early life and education ==
Brumfiel was born in Chicago, Illinois and attended Evanston Township High School. She participated as a Peace Corps volunteer in La Paz, Bolivia in 1966–1967. She got her B.A. and Ph.D. degrees in anthropology from the University of Michigan in 1965 and 1976 respectively and in 1969 got her M.A. in the same field from the University of California, Los Angeles.

== Career ==
Brumfiel was a Peace Corps volunteer from 1966 to 1967 and until 1968 served as research assistant at the Center for Population Planning, University of Michigan. From 1970 to 1977, she served as lecturer at the Department of Sociology and Anthropology at Eastern Michigan University and between 1971 and 1972, was a teaching fellow at the Department of Anthropology, University of Michigan. She then relocated to Albion, Michigan, where she became an assistant professor at the Department of Anthropology and Sociology of Albion College and after serving as a chair of the department was promoted to assistant professor, serving as such from 1985 to 1989. Brumfiel was promoted to professor in 1989 at the same department of the same institution, and in 1996 became John S. Ludington, Endowed Professor.

== Research ==
Brumfiel's publications focused on gender, political economy, and the relationship between these areas of scholarship. She also worked to show how archaeology, as an academic discipline, is connected to other fields of anthropology and to other disciplines such as gender studies and political science. Brumfiel conducted an archaeological project at the site of Xaltocan in Mexico starting in 1987. Before that, she participated with Richard Blanton at Monte Albán in Mexico and directed research at the Mexican sites of Xico and Huexotla.

Brumfiel was one of the first scholars to examine the role of women in Aztec culture through their interactions. Brumfiel studied how these interactions evolved over time through food preparation methods as well as textile manufacturing. “Mexican archeologists respected her very strongly,” said Gabriela Vargas-Cetina, an anthropology professor at the Universidad Autónoma de Yucatán, in Mérida, Mexico. Brumfiel also served on the editorial boards of Latin American Antiquity and Ancient Mesoamerica and was an advisory editor of the Current Anthropology. She helped found the World Council of Anthropological Associations and held strong feminist and liberal views. From 2000 to 2002, she was a distinguished lecturer at Sigma Xi and then taught at Albion College in Michigan for 25 years before joining Northwestern University in 2003. She was president of the American Anthropological Association from 2003 to 2005.

In 2006, conservative author David Horowitz listed her among the most dangerous professors in his book "The Professors: The 101 Most Dangerous Academics in America" because of her strong voice on social justice and human rights. In 2007, she was honored with the Eagle Warrior Prize and from 2008 to 2009 she served as lead curator of "The Aztec World" at the Field Museum of Natural History in Chicago, Illinois.

== Personal life and death ==
Prior to her death from cancer in Skokie, Illinois hospice in 2012, Brumfiel was married to her husband, Vincent, and had a son with him, Geoffrey.

== Significant works ==
=== Edited volumes ===
- 2003 Factional Competition and Political Development in the New World (John W. Fox, co-editor) Cambridge University Press.
- 2005 La Producción Local y el Poder en el Xaltocan Posclásico – Production and Power at Postclassic Xaltocan Instituto Nacional De Antropologia e Historía
- 2008 Specialization, Exchange and Complex Societies (Timothy K. Earle, co-editor) Cambridge University Press.
- 2008 The Aztec World (Gary M. Feinman, co-editor) Abrams.
- 2010 Gender, Households, and Society: Unraveling the Threads of the Past and the Present (Cynthia Robin, co-editor) Wiley-Blackwell.
- Alien bodies, everyday people, and internal spaces: Embodiment, figurines and social discourse in Postclassic Mexico (with Lisa Overholtzer). In C. Halperin, K. Faust, and R. Taube, eds. in press
- Mesoamerica. In The Oxford Handbook of Archaeology, C. Gosden and B. Cunliffe, eds. Oxford: Oxford University Press. in press.

=== Journal entries ===
- "Gender, Cloth, Continuity and Change: Fabricating Unity in Anthropology". American Anthropologist 108:861–877. in press .
- "Methods in Feminist and Gender Archaeology: A Feeling for Difference—and Likeness". In The Handbook of Gender in Archaeology, S.M. Nelson, ed., pp. 31–58. Walnut Creek, CA: Altamira. 2006
- Opting In and Opting Out: Tula, Cholula, and Xaltocan. In Settlement and Subsistence in Early Civilizations: Essays reflecting the contributions of Jeffrey R. Parsons, R.E. Blanton and M.H. Parsons, eds, pp. 63–88. Los Angeles: Cotsen Institute of Archaeology, University of California, Los Angeles.20. 2005.
- "Materiality, Feasts, and Figured Worlds in Aztec Mexico". In Rethinking Materiality, E. DeMarrais, C. Gosden, and C. Renfrew, eds., pp. 225–237. Cambridge: McDonald Institute for Archaeological Research. 2005.
