= 2020s in science and technology =

This article is a summary of the 2020s in science and technology.

== Biology and medicine ==
- DeepMind used artificial intelligence for the first time to predict protein folding.
- Singapore became the first jurisdiction to approve the sale of cultured meat.
- The vaccines produced by Pfizer/BioNTech and Moderna against Coronavirus disease 2019 became the first vaccines developed using messenger RNA and mark the fastest vaccine development and approval, taking only 10 months.
- Oregon became the first jurisdiction to legalize the medicinal use of psilocybin for mental health treatment.

== Energy ==
- QuantumScape revealed that it had created the first functioning prototype of a solid-state battery, promising to massively increase battery capacity.
- The Chinese Experimental Advanced Superconducting Tokamak was turned on for the first time. The China Fusion Engineering Test Reactor is being planned for commissioning later in the decade.
- Group14 Technologies has patented SCC55, a silicon-carbon composite, leading to 50% more in fully lithiated volumetric energy density than graphite used in conventional lithium-ion battery anodes.

== Environmental sciences ==
- The United Nations has designated the 2020s as the Decade of Ocean Science for Sustainable Development.

== Transport ==
=== Air ===
- In 2021, United Airlines revealed plans to purchase 15 supersonic Boom Overture aircraft by the end of the decade.

=== Land ===
- Waymo became the first company to offer self-driving car services to the general public without a human supervisor in Chandler, Arizona.
- Autonomous delivery vehicles began transporting food to customers in Texas in 2021.

== Computing and artificial intelligence ==
- Artificial intelligence-assisted coding began to emerge in the early 2020s.
- El Salvador passed Bitcoin law to become the first country to give cryptocurrency and bitcoin the status of legal tender.

== Physics ==
- In January 2020, Physicists discovered a unique metal with billions of quantum entangled electrons.
- The Large Hadron Collider will once again begin operation in early 2021; the collider was shut down in December 2018 "to enable major upgrade and renovation works."

== See also ==
- 2020s#Science and technology
- History of science and technology
- List of science and technology articles by continent
- List of years in science
  - 2025 in science
- Impact of the COVID-19 pandemic on science and technology
- History of technology by type
- List of science timelines
