= 2010s in health and society =

This article is a summary of developments in health and society during the 2010s

== Ageing population ==
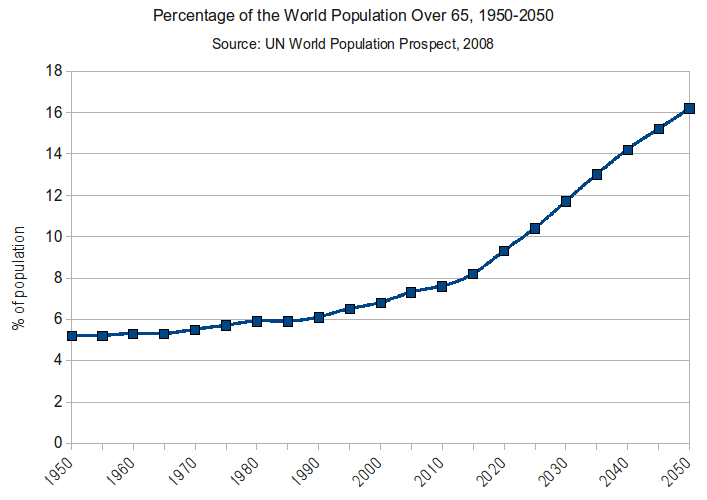
Percentage of world population over 65

The 2010s was the decade in which most baby boomers (described as individuals born between 1946 and 1964, an era which had seen an increase in birth rates in many parts of the world, as economies recovered and vast numbers of predominantly younger men were demobilised or released from captivity after the Second World War) in developed nations retired, putting pressure on pension programs and other safety net programs. Many countries reported declining fertility rates in their 2010 censuses. The consequences of an aging society were felt hardest in Europe and Japan, which were the first to experience substantial population decline.

Over 20% of Japan's population was over the age of 65, making it the most elderly nation. As a result, Japan examined alternative solutions for elder care, including robots. In the United States, proposals for revising Medicare and Social Security proliferated, including raising the age of retirement or adjusting benefit amounts. Opponents instead wanted to increase benefit levels. In 2010, France debated and raised the retirement age from 60 to 62, despite widespread demonstrations in opposition. A few years later the threshold was lowered back to 60. By 2017, many countries were planning to raise their retirement age to 67+ over the coming years.

== Gender relations ==
Fourth-wave feminism was claimed to have started around 2013. An especially notable feature of it was that of intersectionality, which argued that women's experiences differed radically based on the impact of their other identities, such as class, ethnicity or sexual orientation. The Me Too movement spread as a protest against sexual harassment, especially in professional settings.

An antifeminist backlash also occurred. This was especially prevalent in the online manosphere, such as in the men's rights movement as well as in more exclusionary communities such as incels and Men Going Their Own Way. Misogynist ideologies were also linked to violent attacks against women, with notable examples in the United States being the 2014 Isla Vista killings and the 2018 Tallahassee shooting.

== Environmentalism ==
During the course of the decade, climate change was a growing topic of concern, with more than half of the global population viewing it as a "very serious problem" in 2015 and giving broad support for limits on greenhouse gas emissions to address the issue. Concerns over plastic pollution grew considerably, with the effects of plastic waste on the Earth's environment gaining global awareness particularly in the second half of the decade. In 2012, it was estimated that there was approximately 165 million tons of plastic pollution in the world's oceans. Plastic waste minimisation initiatives were launched around the world, with bans on various plastic products, ranging from plastic bags and straws to plastic cutlery. Plastic pollution was linked to climate change, with a 2019 report warning that by 2050, plastic could emit 56 billion tons of greenhouse gas emissions, as much as 14 percent of the Earth's remaining carbon budget.

Threats to biodiversity also gained greater awareness. In its first report since 2005, the Intergovernmental Science-Policy Platform on Biodiversity and Ecosystem Services (IPBES) warned in May 2019 that biodiversity loss was "accelerating", with over a million species threatened with extinction.

Renewable energies enjoyed a surge in popularity, due to lower costs and increased efficiency, receiving more investment than traditional fossil fuels. In 2015, Hawaii became the first state in the United States to formally commit to a plan of developing a 100% clean energy grid. In 2018, California's state commission approved a plan requiring solar panels for all residential buildings starting in 2020. In China, as pollution reached critical levels, the government began investing in clean energies to improve the air quality.

Greta Thunberg inspired a global movement of young people protesting inaction on climate change with truancy. A concurrent movement, the Extinction Rebellion, used more extreme non-violent methods for the same cause. In the 2019 European Parliament elections, green parties won a record number of seats. In the United States, the proposed Green New Deal rose in prominence.

== LGBT rights ==
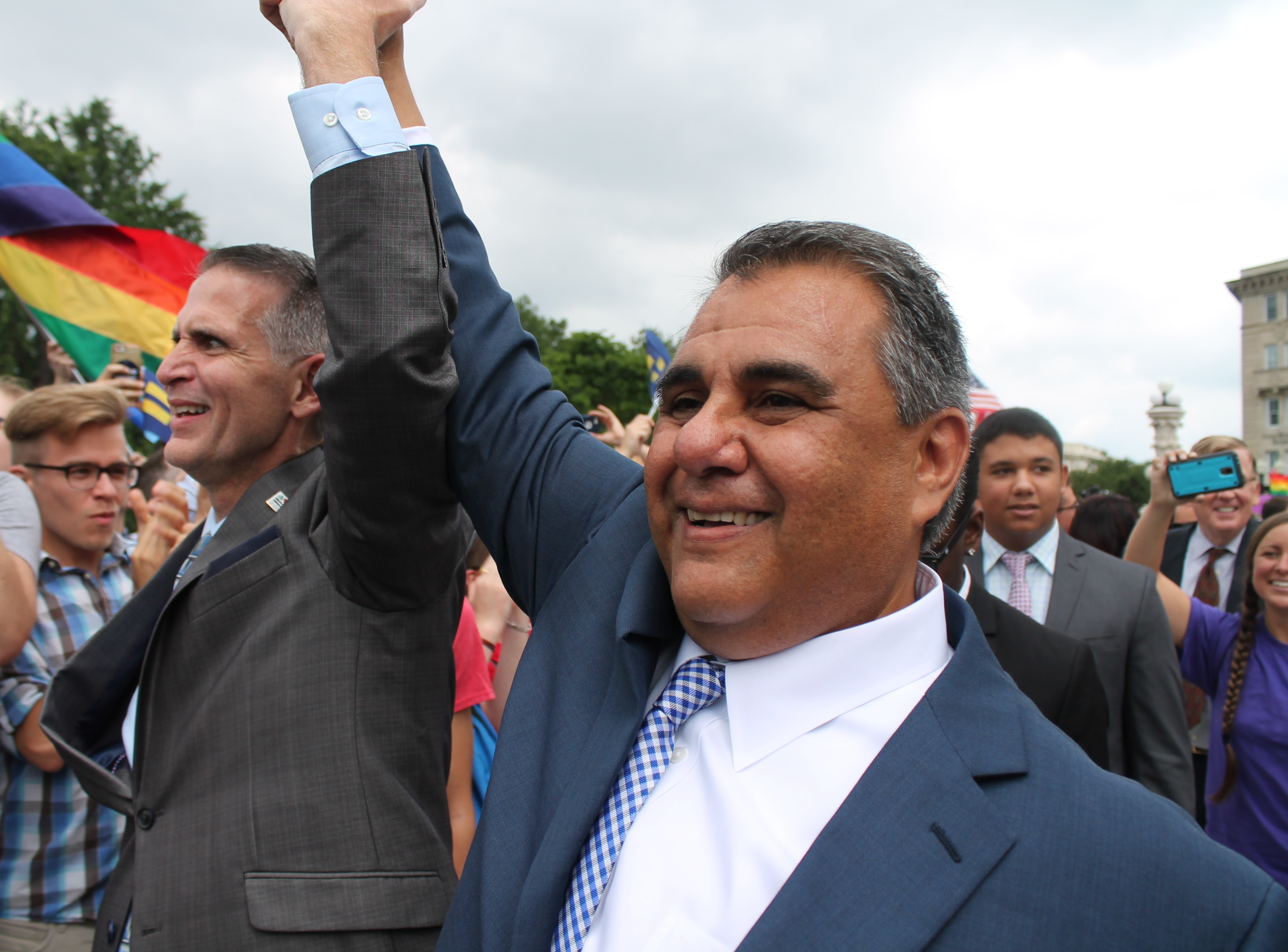
Plaintiffs celebrate outside the Supreme Court on 26 June 2015 following same-sex marriage legalization in the United States nationwide.

During the 2010s, acceptance of LGBT people gradually increased in many parts of the world. Marriage for same-sex couples was an ongoing debate in many nations, while over eighteen nations legalized same-sex marriage.

In June 2011 the United Nations Human Rights Council passed the UN's first-ever motion condemning discrimination against gays, lesbians and bisexuals commissioning a report on the issue. During an ABC News interview in 2012, Barack Obama expressed his support for gay marriage, becoming the first U.S. president to openly do so. Although many nations allowed gays and bisexuals to serve in their militaries, a major milestone came in September 2011 when the U.S. abolished its "Don't ask, don't tell" military policy. In August 2013, New Zealand became the first country in Oceania to allow same-sex couples to marry.

In 2015, Ireland became the first nation to legalize same-sex marriage via referendum. In 2017, Leo Varadkar became Ireland's first openly gay Taoiseach, joining the ranks of other nation's first openly gay and lesbian heads of state in the 2010s. In May 2019, Taiwan became the first Asian country to legalize same-sex marriage. Botswana decriminalized homosexuality in June 2019 while Ecuador legalized same-sex marriage that same month. Transgender issues asserted themselves as a mainstream LGBT topic in the 2010s, particularly in the West. In the United States, organizations such as the Girl Scouts and the Episcopal Church announced acceptance of transgender people in the early half of the 2010s. In April 2015, former olympic athlete Caitlyn Jenner came out as a transgender woman, and was subsequently called the most famous openly transgender person in the world at the time.

However, LGBT rights supporters continued to face legal obstacles with the implementation of laws curbing expression of homosexuality in Russia and China, as well as in the United States, with the Trump administration's attempts to reinstate the ban on transgender people serving in the military and the rescission of protections for transgender students. On 24 May 2019, Kenya's Supreme Court upheld laws that criminalize gay sex, declining to join the handful of nations that had recently abolished a prohibition imposed by Britain during the colonial era. By 2019, more than 70 countries continued to have gay sex criminalized, most of them Muslim-majority countries or former British colonies, according to advocacy groups.

== Children and youth ==
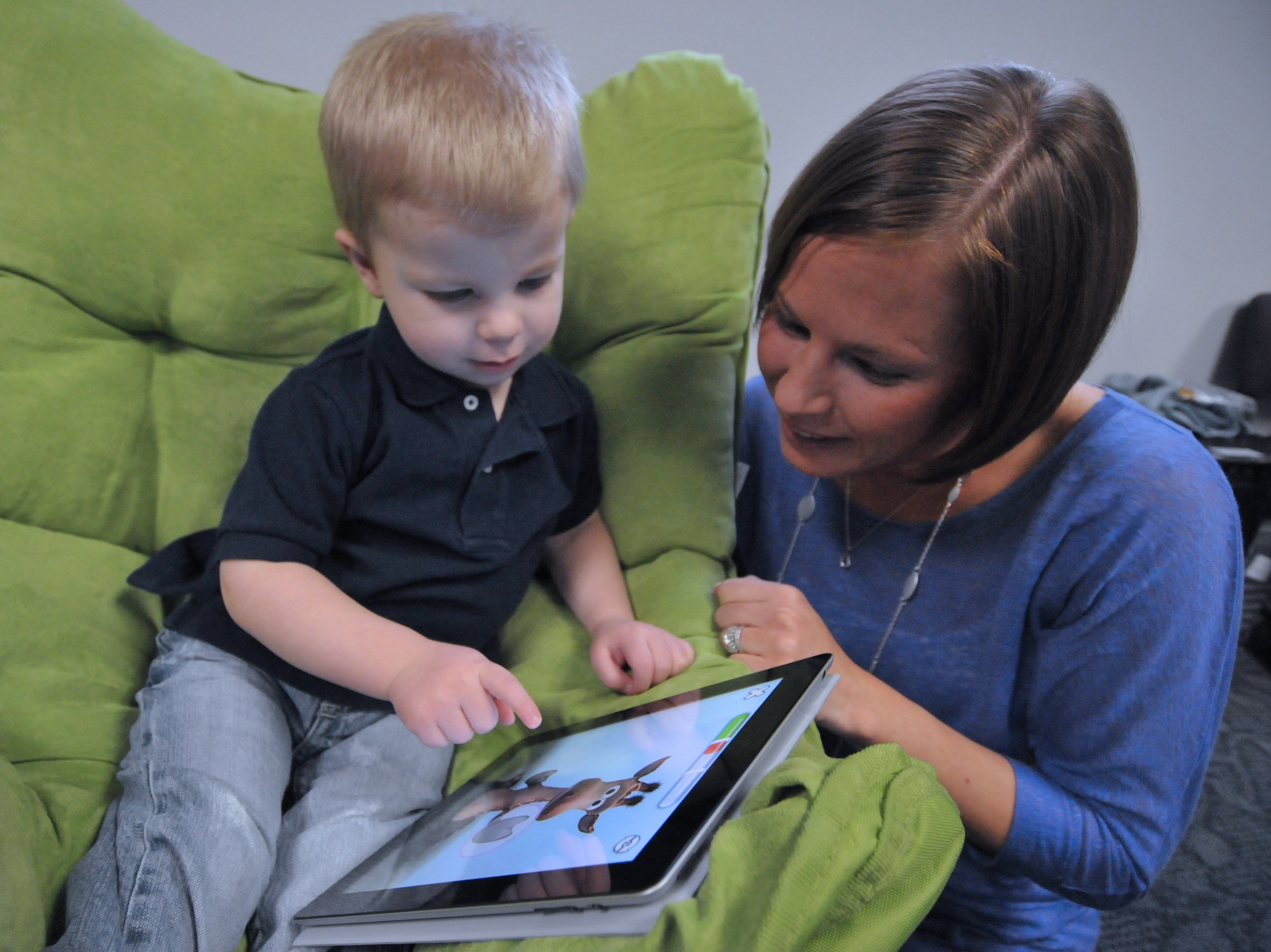
Video streaming services such as YouTube and free or relatively cheap mobile games became popular forms of entertainment for small children during the 2010s.

By the 2010s, younger people in many parts of the world had been surrounded by widespread internet use for their entire lives. The psychological effects of social media and the internet on the minds of young people, especially children, became an increasing concern during this decade.

The youth of the 2010s were called the "best-behaved generation on record." In May 2014, the U.S. Centers for Disease Control reported that teenage pregnancies and their uses of drugs and alcohol reached record lows. A 2013 survey showed that the rate of teen smoking dropped to 15.7%, the rate of teenagers having unprotected sex dropped to 34% and the rate of teenagers participating in a physical fight dropped to 25%, much lower than their counterparts 22 years earlier. E-cigarette and smokeless tobacco use among teenagers rose. Similar trends were noted elsewhere, a report looking at statistics from 2018-19 noted that the levels of adolescents aged ten to seventeen in England and Wales being cautioned or sentenced for criminal activity had fallen by 83% over the previous decade, whilst the numbers entering the youth justice system for the first time had fallen by 85%. Whilst, research from Australia suggested that crime rates among that age group had declined throughout the 2010s.

== E-cigarettes ==
The e-cigarette gained popularity within the 2010s, with the number of vapers worldwide increasing from approximately 7 million in 2011 to 41 million in 2018. The JUUL e-cigarette became the most popular e-cigarette in the U.S. in 2017 with a market share of over 72%, and Altria became the most valuable e-cigarette company in the world by 2018. Many cities across the United States started to take action in response to the spike of use by young people in middle and high schools. In 2019, San Francisco became the 1st city in the United States to ban the sale of e-cigarettes altogether.

== Disease ==
=== Epidemics ===
Event	Date	Description
West African Ebola virus epidemic	December 2013 – June 2016	An outbreak of the Ebola virus, the worst of its kind in history, killed more than 11,300 people in West Africa. In August 2014, the World Health Organization declared it a public health emergency of international concern. On 14 January 2016, the WHO declared the epidemic to be over, despite continuing small flare-ups at the time.
Zika virus epidemic	April 2015 – November 2016	A zika virus spreads rapidly throughout Latin America, with imported cases being reported worldwide.
Middle East respiratory syndrome outbreak in South Korea	May–July 2015	An outbreak of Middle East respiratory syndrome in South Korea caused over thirty deaths. Thousands were quarantined.
2018–20 Kivu Ebola epidemic	August 2018 – June 2020	A second Ebola outbreak began in August 2018 in the eastern region of Kivu in the Democratic Republic of the Congo. On 3 May 2019, nine months into the outbreak, the DRC outbreak surpassed 1,000 deaths. By June 2019, 2,426 people had died and the virus had spread to neighboring Uganda, becoming an epidemic; the World Health Organization declared the outbreak a public health emergency of international concern on 17 July.

=== Pandemics ===
Event	Date	Infections and deaths	Description
2009 Swine Flu Pandemic	January 2009 – 10 August 2010	491,382 confirmed cases and 18,449 deaths. Estimated cases range from 700 million to 1.4 billion and a death toll from 151,700 to 575,000	
COVID-19 pandemic	December 2019 – May 2023	10,694,288 confirmed cases and 516,210 deaths in 229 countries and territories reported by July 3, 2020.	A new coronavirus, first designated 2019-nCoV and later named severe acute respiratory syndrome coronavirus 2 (SARS-CoV-2), spread throughout the world, causing significant loss of life and severe economic disruption.
HIV/AIDS	1981 – ongoing	37.9 million people living with HIV (end of 2018), 24.5 million people accessing antiretroviral therapy (end of June 2019), 32.0 million deaths from AIDS-related illnesses since the start of the epidemic (end 2018)	
