= 1990s in sociology =

- 1980s
- 1990s in sociology
- 2000s
Other topics in 1990s:
- Anthropology
- Comics
- Fashion
- Motorsport
- Music
- Science and technology
- Television
- Video games

The following events related to sociology occurred in the 1990s.

== 1990 ==
- Aung San Suu Kyi's Burma and India: Some aspects of intellectual life under colonialism is published.
- Zygmunt Bauman's Thinking Sociologically is published.
- Raymond Boudon's The Art of Self-Persuasion: The Social Explanation of False Beliefs is published.
- James Coleman's Foundations of Social Theory is published.
- Troy Duster's Backdoor To Eugenics is published.
- Ian Hacking's The Taming of Chance is published.
- Nicole Lapierre's The Silence of the Memory is published and wins the Bulzoni Editore Special Award.
- M. Rainer Lepsius' and Wolfgang J. Mommsen's (ed.) Max Weber. Briefe 1906-1908 is published and wins the European Amalfi Prize for Sociology and Social Sciences.
- Chen Liangjin's Social Developmental Mechanisms and Social Security Functions is published.
- Alejandro Portes' and Rubén Rumbaut's Immigrant America: A Portrait is published.
- John B. Thompson's Ideology and Modern Culture: Critical Social Theory in the Era of Mass Communications is published.
- Paul Willis's Common culture: symbolic work at play in the everyday cultures of the young is published.
- William Julius Wilson serves as the president of the ASA.
- Naomi Wolf's The Beauty Myth: How Images of Beauty Are Used Against Women is published.

=== Deaths ===
- February 17: Hans Speier
- August 1: Norbert Elias
- October 22: Louis Althusser

== 1991 ==
- Cornelius Castoriadis' Philosophy, Politics and Autonomy is published.
- Louis Dumont's L'idéologie allemande. France-Allemagne et retour (later translated as German ideology: from France to Germany and back) is published and wins the European Amalfi Prize for Sociology and Social Sciences.
- Clive Emsley's English police: a political and social history is published.
- Ron Eyerman's and Andrew Jamison's Social movements: a cognitive approach is published.
- Mike Featherstone's, Mike Hepworth's and Bryan Turner's The body: social process and cultural theory is published.
- Ann Game's Undoing the Social: Towards a deconstructive sociology is published.
- Steven Goldberg's When Wish Replaces Thought: Why So Much of What You Believe Is False is published.
- Anthony Giddens' Modernity and Self Identity is published.
- Donna Haraway's A Cyborg Manifesto is published.
- Nicos Panayiotou Mouzelis's Back to Sociological Theory: The Construction of Social Orders is published.
- Philippe Sarasin's Die Stadt der Bürger is published and wins the Bulzoni Editore Special Award.
- Immanuel Wallerstein's Unthinking Social Science: The Limits of Nineteenth Century Paradigms
- Stanley Lieberson serves as president of the ASA.

=== Deaths ===
- June 28/June 29: Henri Lefebvre
- August 21: Oswald von Nell-Breuning

== 1992 ==
- Pierre Bourdieu's and Loïc Wacquant's An invitation to Reflexive Sociology is published.
- Fei Xiaotong's Xingxing chong xingxing: Xiangzhen Fazhan Lunshu 《行行重行行》 (Travel, travel, and more travel: On Rural Development) is published.
- Shmuel Noah Eisenstadt's Jewish civilization: the Jewish historical experience in a comparative perspective is published.
- Harvie Ferguson's Religious transformation in Western society: The End of Happiness is published.
- Stuart Hall's, David Held's and Tony Mcgrew's Modernity and its Futures is published.
- David Lockwood's Solidarity and schism: the problem of disorder in Durkheimian and Marxist sociology is published.
- Niklas Luhmann's Observations of modern trends is published.
- Sal Restivo's Mathematics in Society and History is published.
- Chris Shilling's The Body and Social Theory is published.
- Richard Skellington's and Paulette Morris's (eds.) Race in Britain Today is published.
- Alain Touraine's Critique of Modernity is published.
- Carlo Triglia's Sviluppo senza autonomia: effetti perversi delle politiche nel Mezzogiorno is published.
- James Coleman serves as president of the American Sociological Association (ASA)

=== Deaths ===
- December 9: Thomas Bottomore

== 1993 ==
- Steven Goldberg's Why Men Rule is published.
- Jean-François Lyotard's Toward The Postmodern is published.
- Michael Mann's The Sources of Social Power (Volume 2) is published.
- Michel Maffesoli's The Contemplation of the World (La Contemplation du monde): figures of community style is published.
- Douglas Massey's and Nancy Denton's American Apartheid: Segregation and the Making of the Underclass is published and wins the Distinguished Publication Award of the American Sociological Association.
- George Ritzer's The McDonaldization of Society is published.
- Renato Rosaldo's Culture and Truth is published.
- Charles Tilly's European Revolutions, 1492–1992 is published and wins the European Amalfi Prize for Sociology and Social Sciences the next year.
- Cornel West's Race Matters is published.

== 1994 ==
- Nigel Dodd's The Sociology of Money is published.
- Anthony Giddens' Beyond Left and Right is published.
- Deborah Lupton's Medicine as Culture: Illness, Disease and the Body in Western Societies is published.
- Angela McRobbie's Postmodernism and popular culture is published.
- Ralph Miliband's Socialism for a Sceptical Age is published.
- Charles Murray's The Bell Curve is published.
- Viviana Zelizer's The Social Meaning of Money is published.

=== Deaths ===
- February 14 – Christopher Lasch

== 1995 ==
- Ulrich Beck's Ecological Politics in the Age of Risk is published.
- Walden Bello founded Focus on the Global South in Bangkok, Thailand.
- Raymond Boudon's Le Juste et le vrai is published.
- Colin Crouch's Reinventing collective action: from the global to the local is published.
- François Furet's The Passing of an Illusion: The Idea of Communism in the Twentieth Century is published.
- Ian Hacking's Rewriting the Soul: Multiple Personality and the Sciences of Memory is published.
- David Hollinger's Postethnic America: Beyond Multiculturalisms is published.
- Christopher Lasch's The Revolt of the Elites and the Betrayal of Democracy is published.
- Sarah Nettleton's Sociology of Health and Illness is published.
- Charles Tilly's Popular contention in Great Britain, 1758-1834 is published.
- John B. Thompson's The Media and Modernity: A social Theory of the Media is published.
- Ken Morrison's Marx, Durkheim, Weber: Formations of Modern Social Thought is published.

=== Deaths ===
- November 4: Gilles Deleuze

== 1996 ==
- Les Back's New Ethnicities and Urban culture is published.
- Tim Dant's Fetishism and the social value of objects is published.
- Stuart Hall's and Paul Du Gay's Questions of cultural identity is published.
- Stevi Jackson's and Sue Scott's Feminism and Sexuality is published.
- Richard Jenkins' Social Identity is published.
- David Lee's and Bryan Turner's Conflicts about Class: Debating Inequality in Late Industrialism is published.
- Serge Latouche's The Westernisation of the World is published.
- Andrew W. Metcalfe's and Ann Game's Passionate Sociology is published.
- Michel Maffesoli's The Time of the Tribes: The Decline of Individualism in Mass Society is published in English translation.
- Anna Pollert's Gender and Class Revisited; or, the Poverty of 'Patriarchy' is published.
- Cyril Smith's Marx at the millennium is published.
- John Solomos' and Les Back's Racism and Society is published.
- Mobilization: The International Quarterly Review of Social Movement Research is first published by Hank Johnston.

== 1997 ==
- Jean Baudrillard's A Conjuration of Imbeciles is published.
- Ulrich Beck's The Reinvention of Politics is published.
- Michael Bury's Health and Illness in a changing society is published.
- Stuart Hall's (ed.) Representation: Cultural Representations and Signifying Process is published.
- Niklas Luhmann's Die Gesellschaft der Gesellschaft (translated as Theory of Society) is published and wins the European Amalfi Prize for Sociology and Social Sciences.
- Beverley Skeggs's Formations of Class and Gender: Becoming Respectable is published.
- Sylvia Walby's Gender Transformations is published.
- Katherine Woodward's Identity and Difference is published.
- Slavoj Žižek's Multi-culturalism or The Cultural Logic of Multi-national Capitalism is published.
- Neil Smelser serves as president of the ASA.
- Jared Diamond's Guns, Germs, and Steel: The Fates of Human Societies is published.
- Nathan Glazer's We Are All Multiculturalists Now is published.

== 1998 ==
- Ulrich Beck's World Risk Society is published.
- Manuel Castells published the final volume of his The Information Age: Economy, Society and Culture trilogy
- Anthony Giddens' The Third Way is published.
- Ian Hacking's Mad Travellers is published.
- Ron Eyerman's and Andrew Jamison's Music and Social Movements: Mobilizing Traditions in the Twentieth Century is published.
- Serge Latouche's L'Autre Afrique: Entre don et marché is published.
- Richard Sennett's The Corrosion of Character: The Personal Consequences of Work in the New Capitalism is published.
- Pierre Bourdieu's La Domination masculine is published.
- Gordon Marshall's and John Scott's A Dictionary of Sociology is published.

=== Deaths ===
- November 6: Niklas Luhmann

== 1999 ==
- David Byrne's Social Exclusion is published.
- Colin Crouch's Social Change in Western Europe is published.
- Máirtín Mac an Ghaill's Contemporary Racisms and Ethnicities: Social and Cultural Transformations is published.
- Germaine Greer's The Whole Woman is published.
- Ian Hacking's The Social Construction of What? is published.
- Charles Murray's The Underclass Revisited is published
- Susan Moller Okin's Is Multiculturalism Bad For Women? is published.
- Anne Phillips' Which equalities matter? is published.
- Alejandro Portes serves as president of the American Sociological Association
- Alain Touraine's Comment sortir du libéralisme is published.
- Zygmunt Bauman's Liquid Modernity is published.
- The Polish Sociological Review published Institutionalization of Sociology
