= 1990s in anthropology =

- 1980s
- 1990s in anthropology
- 2000s
Other topics in 1990s:
- Comics
- Fashion
- Motorsport
- Music
- Science and technology
- Sociology
- Television
- Video games

Timeline of anthropology, 1990–1999

== Events ==
1990

- NAGPRA, the Native American Graves Protection and Repatriation Act, is passed into US law

1991

- "Ötzi the Iceman" discovered in the Alps

== Publications ==
1991

- Donald Brown's Human Universals was published

1992

- Inalienable Possessions: The Paradox of Keeping-While-Giving by Annette B. Weiner

1994

- Nightwork: Sexuality, Pleasure, and Corporate Masculinity in a Tokyo Hostess Club, by Anne Allison

1995

- In Search of Respect: Selling Crack in El Barrio, by Philippe Bourgois
- The Development of Cognitive Anthropology, by Roy D'Andrade

1996

- Permitted and Prohibited Desires: Mothers, Comics, and Censorship in Japan, by Anne Allison

1998

- The Future of Us All: Race and Neighborhood Politics in New York City, by Roger Sandek
- Envisioning Power: Ideologies of Dominance and Crisis, by Eric Wolf

== Deaths ==
1990

- Kathleen Aberle
- Michael Leiriss

1991

- Cora Du Bois
- Stanley Diamond

1993

- Albert A. Dahlberg
- Roger Keesing
- Ronald Gofrey Lienhardt
- Michael G. Smith

1994

- Timothy Asch
- Raymond Birdwhistell
- Luther Cressman
- Colin Turnbull

1995

- Ernest Gellner
- James Clyde Mitchell
- David Schneider
- Sol Tax

1996

- Weston La Barre
- Mary Leakey
- Morris Opler
- Elman Service

1997

- John Adair
- Michael Dorris
- Alfred Gell
- Roy Rappaport

1998

- Carlos Castaneda
- Louis Dumont
- Alfonso Villa Rojas

1999

- Arnold Epstein
- Ashley Montagu
- Eric Wolf

== Awards ==
1990

- Margaret Mead Award: Wenda Trevathan
- Victor Turner Prize: Kirin Narayan for Storytellers, Saints and Scoundrels: Folk Narrative and Hindu Religious Teaching

1991

- Margaret Mead Award: Will Roscoe, for The Zuñi Man-Woman
- Victor Turner Prize: Dennis Tedlock, for Days from a Dream Almanac

1993

- Margaret Mead Award: Leo R. Chavez

1994

- Margaret Mead Award: Katherine A. Dettwyler

1997

- Margaret Mead Award: Philippe Bourgois

1998

- Victor Turner Prize: Lawrence Cohen for No Aging in India: Alzheimer's, the Bad Family, and Other Modern Things

1999

- Margaret Mead Award:Paul E. Farmer
