= 2000s in sociology =

- 1990s
- 2000s in sociology
- 2010s
Other topics in 2000s:
- Anthropology
- Comics
- Fashion
- Motorsport
- Music
- Science and technology
- Television
- Video games

The following events related to sociology occurred in the 2000s.

== 2000 ==
- Zygmunt Bauman's Liquid Modernity is published.
- Morris Berman's The Twilight of American Culture is published.
- Harriet Bradley's Social Inequalities: coming to terms with complexity is published.
- Anthony Giddens' Runaway World is published.
- Anthony Giddens' The Third Way and Its Critics is published.
- Stuart Hall's The Multicultural Question is published.
- Bhikhu Parekh's Report of the Commission of the Future of multi-Ethnic Britain is published.
- Robert D. Putnam's Bowling Alone: The Collapse and Revival of American Community is published.
- Diane Richardson's Rethinking Sexuality is published.
- John Solomos' and Les Back's Theories of Race and Racism; A Reader is published.
- Anthony Vidler' Warped Spaces is published.
- Malcolm Waters' Inequality after Class is published.
- Linda Woodhead's and Paul Heelas' Religion in Modern Times (ed.) is published.

== 2001 ==
- Jean Baudrillard's The Spirit of Terrorism is published.
- Raymond Boudon's Origin of values: sociology and philosophy of beliefs is published.
- Stan Cohen's States of Denial: Knowing about Atrocities and Suffering is published.
- Randy David's Reflections on Sociology and Philippine Society is published by the University of the Philippines Press.
- Jay Demerath's Crossing the Gods: World Religions and Worldly Politics is published.
- David Frisby's Cityscapes of Modernity: Critical Explorations is published.
- John B. Thompson's Political scandal : power and visibility in the media age is published.
- Douglas Massey serves as president of the ASA.

== 2002 ==
- Gargi Bhattacharyya's Sexuality and Society is published.
- Grace Davie's Europe: The Exceptional Case is published.
- Clive Emsley's The History of Crime and Crime Control Institutions is published.
- Ian Hacking's Historical Ontology is published.
- Stevi Jackson and Sue Scott's Gender: A Sociological Reader is published.
- Mike Maguire's Crime Statistics: The Data Explosion and its Implications is published.
- David Nelken's White Collar Crime is published.
- Barbara F. Reskin serves as president of the ASA.

=== Deaths ===
- January 23 – Pierre Bourdieu
- August 9 – Peter Neville
- October 2 – Heinz von Foerster

== 2003 ==
- Steve Bruce's Politics and Religion is published.
- Randy David's Nation, Self, and Citizenship: An Invitation to Philippine Sociology is published and wins the National Book Award.
- David Downes' and Paul Rock's Understanding deviance: a guide to the sociology of crime and rule breaking is published.
- Steven Goldberg's Fads and Fallacies in the Social Sciences is published.
- Charles Murray's Human Accomplishment: The Pursuit of Excellence in the Arts and Sciences, 800 B.C. to 1950 is published.

=== Deaths ===
- October 3 – Neil Postman

== 2004 ==
- Eamonn Carrabine's Criminology is published.
- Colin Crouch's Post-Democracy is published.
- Paul Gilroy's After Empire: melancholia or convival culture is published.
- David Goodhart's Discomfort of Strangers is published.
- George Ritzer's Globalisation or Nothing is published.
- Moisés Espírito Santo's Five thousand years of Culture at the West - Etno-History of the Popular Religion in the Region of Estremadura is published.

== 2005 ==
- Colin Crouch's Capitalist diversity and change : recombinant governance and institutional entrepreneurs is published.
- Liu Xiaobo's The Future of Free China in our Life is published by Labor Reform Foundation.
- Michael Mann's The Dark Side of Democracy Explaining Ethnic Cleansing is published.
- John B. Thompson's Books in the digital age: the transformation of academic and higher education publishing in Britain and the United States is published.
- Viviana Zelizer's The Purchase of Intimacy is published.

=== Anniversaries ===
- The 50th birthday of Louis Hartz's The Liberal Tradition in America, first published in 1955.

=== Deaths ===
- April 23: Andre Gunder Frank

== 2006 ==
- Morris Berman's Dark Ages America is published.
- Geoff Dencha's, Kate Gavron's and Michael Young's The new East End : kinship, race and conflict is published.
- Harvie Ferguson's Phenomenological sociology : insight and experience in modern society is published.
- Serge Latouche's How do we learn to want less?The globe downshifted is published.
- Richard Sennett's The Culture of the New Capitalism is published.
- William Outhwaite's The Future of Society is published.

== 2007 ==
- R. Burrows, M. Savage's The Coming Crisis of Empirical Sociology is published.
- Frances Fox Piven serves as president of the ASA.

== 2008 ==
- Arne L. Kalleberg serves as president of the ASA.

== 2009 ==
- Patricia Hill Collins serves as the 100th president of the ASA.
