= 2000s in anthropology =

- 1990s
- 2000s in anthropology
- 2010s
Other topics in 2000s:
- Comics
- Fashion
- Motorsport
- Music
- Science and technology
- Sociology
- Television
- Video games

Timeline of anthropology, 2000–2009

== Events ==
2002

- The French government returns the remains of Saartjie Baartman to South Africa, where she is buried

2003

- The first Homo floresiensis remains are found
- The National Museum of Iraq in Baghdad and archaeological sites throughout Iraq are looted

2004

- The National Museum of the American Indian moves to its present location on the National Mall in Washington, D.C.

== Publications ==
2004

- Native Anthropology: The Japanese Challenge to Western Academic Hegemony, by Takami Kuwayama

== Deaths ==
2001

- Abner Cohen
- Derek Freeman
- Marvin Harris
- George Harrison

2002

- Pierre Bourdieu
- Raymond Firth
- Stephen Jay Gould
- Thor Heyerdahl

2003

- Isaac Schapera

2004

- Jean Rouch

== Awards ==
2001

- Margaret Mead Award: Mimi Nichter
- Victor Turner Prize: Tanya M. Luhrman for Of Two Minds: The Growing Disorder in American Psychiatry

2003

- Margaret Mead Award: Marc Sommers
- Victor Turner Prize: Alan Klima for The Funeral Casino: Meditation, Massacre, and Exchange with the Dead in Thailand and Hugh Raffles for In Amazonia: A Natural History

2004

- Margaret Mead Award: Donna Goldstein
- Victor Turner Prize: John M. Chernoff for Hustling Is Not Stealing: Stories of an African Bar Girl

2005

- Margaret Mead Award: Luke Eric Lassiter

2006

- Margaret Mead Award:

2007

- Margaret Mead Award: João Biehl

2008

- Margaret Mead Award: Daniel Jordan Smith

2009

- Margaret Mead Award: Sverker Finnström
