= European Amalfi Prize for Sociology and Social Sciences =

Italian social science award

The European Amalfi Prize for Sociology and Social Sciences (Premio Europeo Amalfi per la Sociologia e le Scienze Sociali) is an Italian award in the social sciences. Established in 1987 on the initiative of the Section for Sociological Theories and Social Transformations of the Italian Association of Sociology, it is conferred annually in Amalfi to the author of a book or an article which was published within the previous two years and has made an important contribution to sociology.

The award ceremony is accompanied by an international sociological conference. The awardees are selected by a jury currently consisting of Margaret Archer, Allessandro Cavalli, Salvador Giner, Joachim Israel, Michel Maffesoli, Carlo Mongardini (chair), Birgitta Nedelmann, Helga Nowotny, and Piotr Sztompka. Previous members include Anthony Giddens, Peter Gerlich and Friedrich H. Tenbruck.

The award was suspended in 1993 and 1996, 1992 and 2011-2015 the jury decided not to assign the award.

In 1999, a biennial special award for an outstanding first book was established and named after Norbert Elias, the first recipient of the Amalfi Award. There are also other auxiliary awards in various categories; the main award can also be split.

== Laureates [incomplete/inaccurate] ==
- 1987: Norbert Elias for Die Gesellschaft der Individuen
- 1988: Serge Moscovici for La machine à faire des dieux

Michael Mann for The Sources of Social Power. Volume I.

1989 Elected to US Sociological

- 1989: Zygmunt Bauman for Modernity and the Holocaust

Bulzoni Editore Special Award: Michel Wieviorka for Société et terrorisme

- 1990: M. Rainer Lepsius and Wolfgang J. Mommsen (editors) for Max Weber. Briefe 1906-1908

Zygmunt Bauman for The Social Manipulation of Morality, Moralizing Actors, Adiaphorizing Action
Chen Liangjin for Social Developmental Mechanisms and Social Security Functions
Bulzoni Editore Special Award: Nicole Lapierre for Le silence de la mémoire

- 1991: Louis Dumont for L'ideologie allemande

Bulzoni Editore Special Award: Philippe Sarasin for Die Stadt der Bürger
Honourable Mention: Ron Eyerman's and Andrew Jamison for Social Movements

- 1992: main award not assigned

Special Award of the Jury: Carlo Triglia for Sviluppo senza autonomia

- 1993: award suspended

Shortlisted: Harvie Ferguson for Religious Transformation in Western Society, The End of Happiness

- 1994: Charles Tilly for European Revolutions (1942-1992)

Special Award of the Jury: Christoph Braun (editor), Max Weber. Musiksoziologie

- 1995: Raymond Boudon for Le juste et le vrai;

François Furet, Le passé d'une illusion;
Peter-Ulrich Merz-Benz, Tiefsinn und Scharfsinn: Ferdinand Tönnies' begriffliche Konstitution der Sozialwelt

- 1996: award suspended

Shortlisted: Andrew W. Metcalfe and Ann Game for Passionate Sociology

- 1997: Niklas Luhmann for Die Gesellschaft der Gesellschaft (on behalf of the Section for Classics of Contemporary Sociology);

Martin Albrow for The Global Age (on behalf of the Section for New Perspectives in the Social Sciences)

- 1998: Alain Touraine for Comment sortire du liberalisme (on behalf of the Section for Classics of Contemporary Sociology);

Luigi Sturzo Special Award for Political Studies: Serge Latouche

- 1999: :Richard Sennett for The Corrosion the Character (on behalf of the Section for New Perspectives in the Social Sciences)

Norbert Elias Amalfi Prize: David Lepoutre for Cœur de banlieue: codes, rites et langages

- 2000: award suspended
- 2001: John B. Thompson for Political Scandal

Shmuel Noah Eisenstadt for ?
Luigi Sturzo Special Award for Political Studies: Michael Th. Greven for Die politische Gesellschaft
Norbert Elias Amalfi Prize: Wilbert Van Vree for Meetings, Manners and Civilization: The Development of Modern Meeting Behaviour.

- 2002: award suspended
- 2003: Norbert Elias Amalfi Prize: Nikola Tietze for Islamische Identitäten: Formen muslimischer Religiosität junger Männer in Deutschland und Frankreich
- 2004: award suspended
- 2005:Sociological Theories and Social Transformations Section: Suzanne Keller for Community: Pursuing the Dream, Living the Reality
- 2006: Sergio Fabbrini for America and its critics
- 2007: award suspended
- 2008: Pierre Rosanvallon Counter-Democracy: Politics in an Age of Distrust
- 2008: award suspended
- 2010 - Gérard Bronner per La Pensée Extrêmee

== See also ==
- List of social sciences awards
