= Killing With Kindness =

Killing With Kindness: Haiti, International Aid, and NGOs is a 2012 Rutgers University Press book written by Mark Schuller, assistant professor of anthropology and NGO Leadership Development at Northern Illinois University and affiliate at the Faculté d’Ethnologie, University of Haiti.

== Awards ==
Schuller is the 2015 American Anthropological Association/Society for Applied Anthropology Margaret Mead Award.
