= Modernity and the Holocaust =

1989 book by Zygmunt Bauman

Modernity and the Holocaust is a 1989 book by Zygmunt Bauman published by Polity Press. As the title implies, it explores the relationship between modernity and The Holocaust.

The book has been seen as a criticism of modernity, as one of Bauman's arguments is that it was modernity that led to The Holocaust, and that despite several decades passing, the modernity has not yet come to terms with this tragedy.

== Contents ==
Bauman's most famous book, Modernity and the Holocaust, argues that the Holocaust was fundamentally enabled by the features of modernity itself—bureaucratic rationality, instrumental reason, and the social production of moral indifference. Drawing upon Hannah Arendt's books on totalitarianism and the Enlightenment, Bauman developed the argument that the Holocaust should not simply be considered to be an event in Jewish history, nor a regression to pre-modern barbarism. Rather, he argued, the Holocaust should be seen as deeply connected to modernity and its order-making efforts. Procedural rationality, the division of labour into smaller and smaller tasks, the taxonomic categorisation of different species, and the tendency to view obedience to rules as morally good, all played their role in the Holocaust coming to pass. He argued that for this reason modern societies have not fully grasped the lessons of the Holocaust; it tends to be viewed—to use Bauman's metaphor—like a picture hanging on the wall, offering few lessons. In Bauman's analysis the Jews became 'strangers' par excellence in Europe. The Final Solution was pictured by him as an extreme example of the attempt made by society to excise the uncomfortable and indeterminate elements that exist within it. Bauman, like the philosopher Giorgio Agamben, contended that the same processes of exclusion that were at work in the Holocaust could, and to an extent do, still come into play today.

== Reception ==
Moishe Postone reviewed the book for the American Journal of Sociology in 1992. He called the book "important and thought-provoking", although he also argued that "several aspects of [Bauman's] book are problematic" or "puzzling". He concluded that despite some issues, the book "represents an important contribution to contemporary sociological thought".

A. Dirk Moses while reviewing Omer Bartov's book Murder in Our Midst: The Holocaust, Industrial Killing, and Representation for the Australian Journal of Politics & History in 2008, noted that Bartov's work has been influenced by Bauman's.

== Awards ==
- European Amalfi Prize for Sociology and Social Sciences (1989)
