= 2000s in science and technology =

- 1990s
- 2000s in science and technology
- 2010s
Other topics in 2000s:
- Anthropology
- Comics
- Fashion
- Motorsport
- Music
- Sociology
- Television
- Video games

This article is a summary of the 2000s in science and technology.

== Science ==
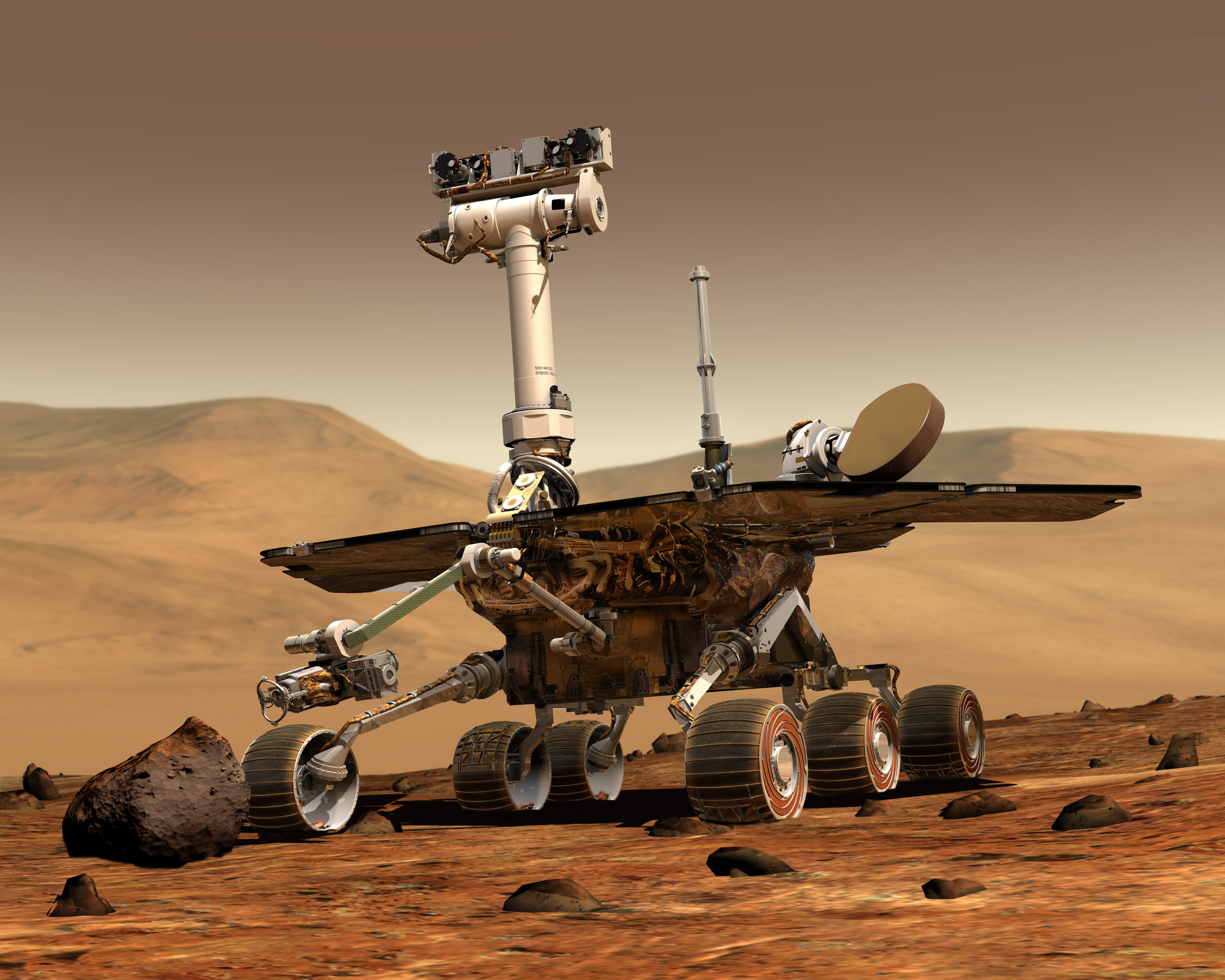
The Mars Exploration Rovers have provided vast amounts of information by functioning well beyond NASA's original estimates.

- Using the Wilkinson Microwave Anisotropy Probe, scientists studying the universe measured that its age is 13.77 billion years; "solidly supported" that it has been expanding and cooling since the Big Bang; and calculated that the universe is composed of about 4.6% atoms, 24% dark matter, and 71% dark energy.
- The Mars Exploration Rover (MER) Mission successfully reached the surface of Mars in 2004, and sent detailed data and images of the landscape there back to Earth. Whilst NASA's original mission timeline of three months was incorrectly speculated, the mission was tremendously successful overall in the long term, as the MER Mission continued until 2018, lasting nearly 25 times the projected length.
- The Human Genome Project was completed in 2003.
- The National Geographic Society and IBM funded The Genographic Project.
- In 2002, Perelman posted the first of a series of eprints to the arXiv, in which he proved the Poincaré conjecture,
- 2004 – The astrophysicist and radio astronomer Naomi McClure-Griffiths identifies a new spiral arm of the Milky Way galaxy
- On 29 July 2005, the discovery of Eris, a Kuiper Belt object larger than Pluto, was announced. In August 2006 Pluto was "demoted" to a "dwarf planet" after being considered a planet for 76 years. Other "dwarf planets" in the Solar System now include Ceres and Eris.
- Space tourism/Private spaceflight began with American Dennis Tito, paying Russia US$20 million for a week-long stay to the International Space Station.
- The Voyager 1 spacecraft entered the heliosheath, marking its departure from the Solar System.
- Scientists discovered water ice on the Moon in 2009.
- AFIS and CODIS became the main forensic tools for fingerprint and genetic code investigation in the industrialized world and some developing countries.
- Infraluciferin became the go-to luciferin for in vivo imaging and threatening to replace natural luciferin entirely.

== Technology ==
=== Information technology ===
This contemporary illustration shows the look personal computers took, which differed from the monitor-over-system unit look that dominated much of the late 20th century. Personal computers also started coming out mainly in black, in contrast to the universal creamy white of much of the late 20th century.

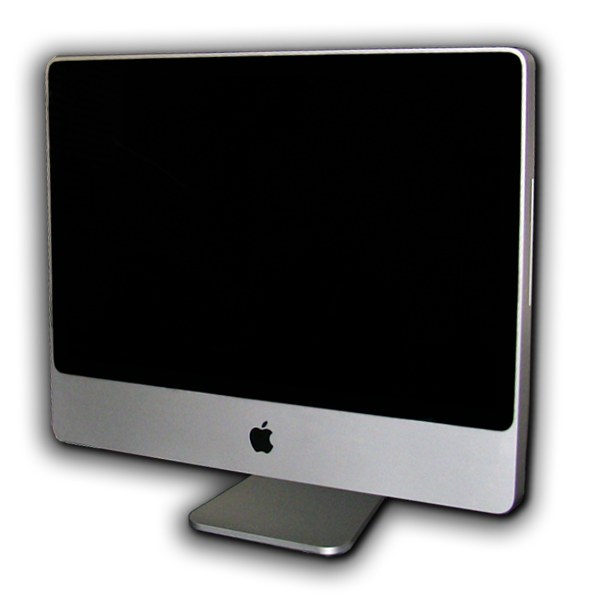
As with the 1980s and 1990s, there continued to be smaller system units, including all-in-one computers.

- There was a huge jump in broadband internet usage globally - for example, it constituted only 6% of U.S. internet users in June 2000 and one mid-decade study predicted 62% adoption by 2010. Yet, by February 2007, over 80% of US Internet users were connected via broadband and broadband internet became almost a required standard for quality internet browsing. There were 77.4 million broadband subscribers in the US in December 2008, with 264 million broadband subscribers alone in the top 30 countries at that time.
- There was a boom in music downloading and the use of data compression to quickly transfer music over the Internet, with a corresponding rise of portable digital audio players, typified by Apple's iPod, along with other MP3 players. Digital music sales rose, accounting for 6% of all music sales in 2005. Digital music options were integrated into other devices such as smartphones and the popular PlayStation Portable (PSP). By the latter half of the decade, generic MP3 players were starting to mimic the features of the extremely popular iPod and Zune.
- As a result of the widespread popularity and social impact of Google Search, the word "google" came to be used as a verb.
- Adobe Flash technology reached the point of being able to make video players. As a result, YouTube, a website which allows uploading and viewing videos, was created. YouTube's popularity grew explosively and it was acquired by Google.
- Data storage prices continued to drop, going from approximately US$7 per GB in early 2000 to US$0.07 per GB in 2009.
- Due to an increase in capacity, USB flash drives rapidly replaced Zip disks and floppy discs (by Iomega) and 3.5-inch diskettes.
- The first 2 TB hard drives were developed and beginning to be used.
- Windows XP and Microsoft Office 2003 became ubiquitous in personal computer software, although their successors Windows Vista and, by the end of the decade, Windows 7, saw increasing market penetration.
- Open-source and free software continued to be a notable but minority interest, with versions of the Linux kernel gaining in popularity, as well as the Mozilla Firefox web browser and the OpenOffice.org productivity suite.
- Blogs, portals, intranets and wikis became common electronic dissemination methods for professionals, amateurs, and businesses to conduct knowledge management.
  - Wikipedia began and grew, becoming both the largest encyclopedia, and the most widely read wiki in the world.
- Wireless networks became ever more commonplace in homes, education institutes and urban public spaces.
- Peer-to-peer technology was used in a major way, such as internet telephony (Skype), file-sharing. The Internet became a major source of all types of media, from music to movies, thanks initially to file-sharing peer-to-peer programs such as Kazaa and LimeWire. The debate continued over the ethics of file sharing. Legal music download services such as iTunes and streaming services such as Spotify opened up new markets.
- The video game industry's profits surpassed the movie industry's in 2004.
- The US technology market suffered a major downturn following the dot-com bubble's burst in 2000, but began a significant rebound in 2003
- Social networking websites like Myspace and Facebook and microblogging platforms like Twitter gained in popularity.
- Smartboards in schools gained acceptance and were adopted rapidly during the middle years of the decade.
- E-book readers using electronic paper technology were developed, and enjoyed modest popularity.

==== Software development ====
- The Agile Manifesto was launched and agile project management approaches such as Scrum grew in popularity. However, due to factors such as inflexibility in procurement processes, and lack of expertise among civil servants, government computing projects continued to fail with regularity, notably in the United Kingdom.
- A large number of software development and software testing jobs in rich nations were offshored to less wealthy countries such as India and Russia, mirroring a globalisation trend that had already occurred in physical manufacturing.
  - There was also a trend of offshoring software development work to cities like Dubai and Singapore - where Western developers rubbed shoulders with other foreign workers - and "offshoring" within the EU (including nearshoring).

=== Video ===
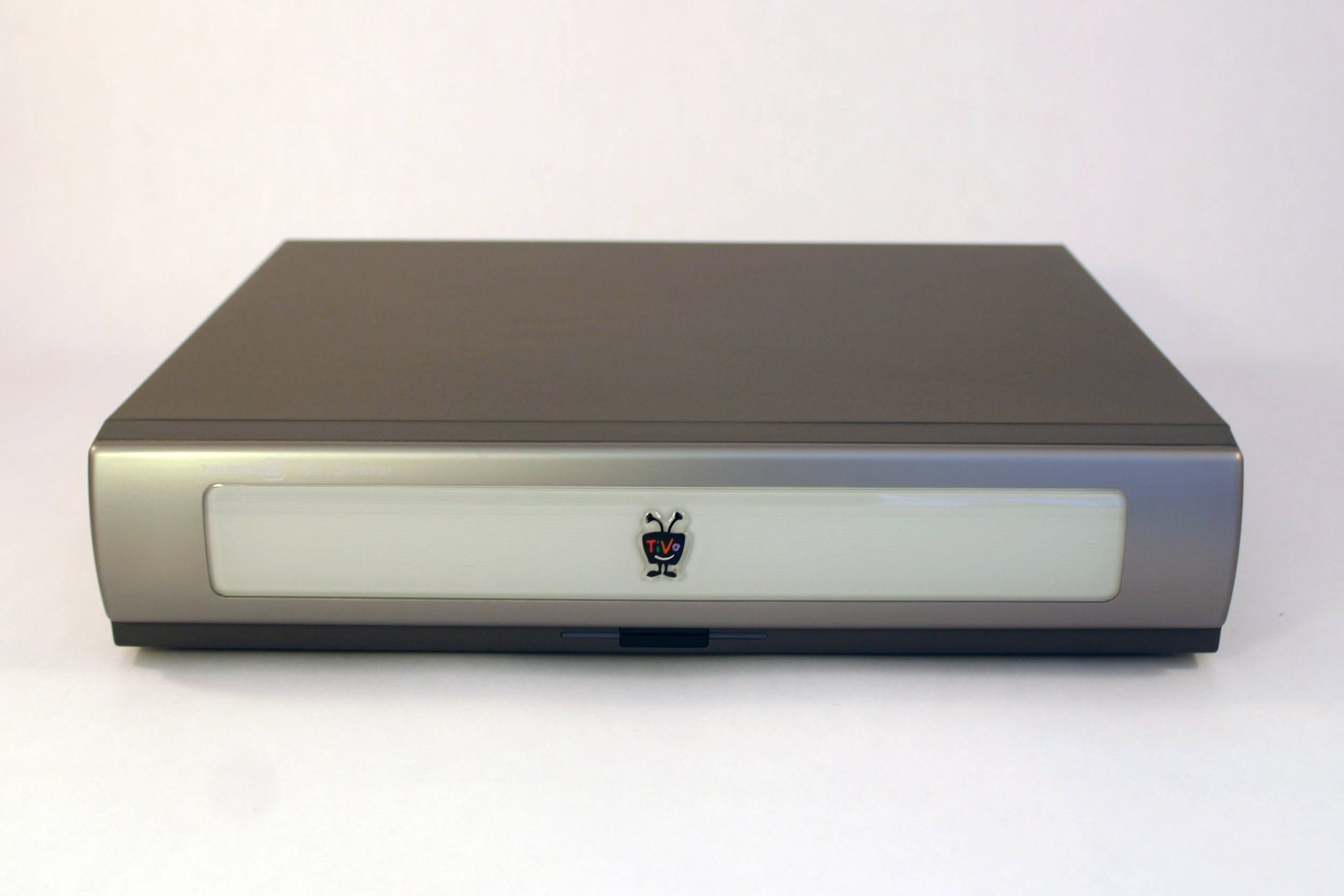
TiVo typified the growth in DVRs

- Digital cameras became very popular due to rapid decreases in size and cost while photo resolution steadily increased. As a result, sales of film reel cameras diminished greatly, and integration into mobile phones increased greatly; sexting by teenagers also became a controversial social issue, with teenagers - and even in one case a school administrator who investigated a sexting case - being arrested.
- Graphics processing units (GPUs) and video cards became powerful enough to render ultra-high-resolution (e.g. 2560 × 1600) scenes in real time with substantial detail and texture.
- Flat panel displays began displacing cathode ray tubes. This was a dramatic change during the decade, as very few flat panels were sold through the mid-2000s (decade) and the majority of stores sell only flat panel TVs by the end of the decade.
- Handheld projectors entered the market and were then integrated into cellphones.
- The digital switchover started to be enforced for television.
- The introduction of digital video recorders (DVRs) allowed consumers to modify content they watch on TV, and to record TV programs and watch them later, leading to problems as consumers could fast-forward through commercials, making them useless, and save TV shows for later viewing, causing a decline in live TV viewing. However, these problems were already present with video tapes.
- Internet usage surpassed TV viewing in 2004. Satellite TV and cable TV (with the exception of digital cable) lost ratings as network television ratings gradually increased.
- TV networks started streaming shows online.
- There was an increase in usage of online DVD rental services such as Netflix.
- DVDs, and subsequently Blu-ray Discs, replaced VCR technology as the common standard in homes and at video stores, although inexpensive VCRs and videocassettes could still be found at some thrift stores and discount stores.

=== Vehicles and energy ===
- There were major advances in hybrid vehicles such as the Toyota Prius, Ford Escape, and the Honda Insight.
- Many more computers and other technologies were incorporated into vehicles, such as Xenon HID headlights, GPS, DVD players, self-diagnosing systems, advanced pre-collision safety systems, memory systems for car settings, back-up sensors and cameras, in-car media systems, MP3 player compatibility, USB drive compatibility, self-parking systems, keyless start and entry, satellite radio, voice-activation, cellphone connectivity, adaptive headlights, HUD (Head-Up-Display), infrared cameras, and Onstar (on GM models).
- There was greater interest in future energy development due to global warming and the potential scenario of peak oil, even though these problems had been known about for decades. Photovoltaics increased in popularity and decreased in cost as a result of increased public interest and generous public subsidies.

=== Communications ===
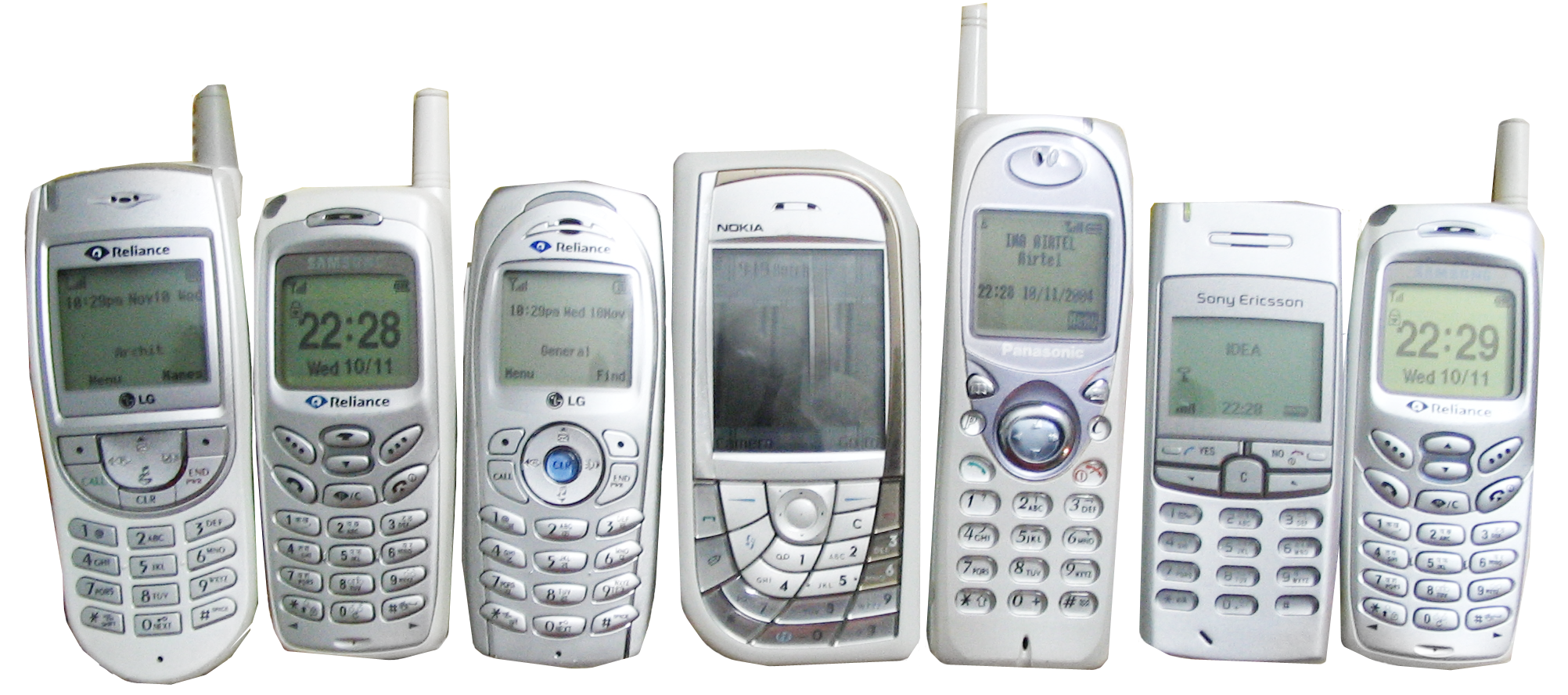
Small, powerful, accessibly priced mobile phones became highly common, and by the end of the decade were expanding quickly in third-world countries.

- The popularity of mobile phones and text messaging surged in the 2000s decade in the Western world. The advent of text messaging made possible new forms of interaction that were not possible before, resulting in numerous boons such as the ability to receive information on the move. Nevertheless, it also led to negative social implications such as Text "bullying" and the rise of traffic collisions caused by drivers who were distracted as they were texting while driving.
- Due to the major success of broadband Internet connections, Voice over IP (VoIP) began to gain popularity as a replacement for traditional telephone lines. Major telecommunications carriers began converting their networks from TDM to VoIP.
- Unusually for a development heralded by science fiction, videophones were cheap and abundant, yet even by mid-decade, they had not received much attention, perhaps due to the high cost of video calls relative to ordinary calls.
- Mobile phones adopted features such as Internet access, PDA functions, running software applications, video calling, cameras and video recording, and music and video playback as standard. Higher end smartphones continue to offer extra features such as GPS and Wireless.
- Due to improvements in mobile phone displays and memories, most mobile phone carriers offered video viewing services, internet services, and some offered full music downloads, such as Sprint in 2005 and more common use of Bluetooth. This led to a virtual saturation of cell phone ownership among the public in the developed world, increasing the use of mobile phones as everyday carry items, and a sharp decline in the use and numbers of payphones.

=== Robotics ===
- As in previous decades, robotics continued to develop, especially telerobotics in medicine, particularly for surgery.
- Home automation and home robotics advanced in North America; iRobot's "Roomba" was the most successful domestic robot and sold 1.5 million units. (Others of interest include: Robomower, and Scooba as of May 2006)
- The first robotic vehicle completed the DARPA Grand Challenge in 2005 and became the first vehicle to be able to navigate itself with no external interference.
- Humanoid robots and robot kits improved considerably, to the point of retailing as toys. This was typified by RoboSapien and Lego Mindstorms respectively.

=== Space technology ===
- GPS (Global Positioning System) became very popular, especially in the tracking of items or people, and the use in cars. Games that utilize the system, such as geocaching, emerged and developed a niche following.
- The Space Shuttle Columbia disaster occurred in February 2003.
- SpaceShipOne made the first privately funded human spaceflight on June 21, 2004.

=== Healthcare ===
- Corrective eye surgery became popular as costs and potential risk decreased and results further improved.
- 244 new drugs were approved by the U.S. Food and Drug Administration.

=== General retail ===
- RFID (Radio Frequency ID) became widely used in retail giants such as Wal-Mart, as a way to track items and automate stocking and keeping track of items.
- Self-serve kiosks became very widely available, and were used for all kinds of shopping, airplane boarding passes, hotel check-ins, fast food, banking, and car rental. ATMs became nearly universal in much of the First World and very common even in poorer countries and their rural areas.

== See also ==
- 2000 in science
- 2001 in science
- 2002 in science
- 2003 in science
- 2004 in science
- 2005 in science
- 2006 in science
- 2007 in science
- 2008 in science
- 2009 in science
- 2010 in science
- History of science and technology
- List of science and technology articles by continent
- List of years in science
- 2010s in science and technology
