= Mediated quasi-interaction =

Concept in communication science

Mediated quasi-interaction is a concept in communication science that describes a monological interaction between people, which is oriented towards an indefinite range of potential recipients. It involves a fundamental asymmetry between producers and receivers. Some examples of Mediated Quasi-Interaction are television, radio and newspapers and other forms of mass media.

== History ==
The concept was developed by sociologist John Brookshire Thompson, a professor at the University of Cambridge and a fellow of Jesus College. The concept is first documented in his book “The Rise of Mediated Interaction”, which was published in 1995 in Cambridge, UK. Thompson developed a conceptual framework for the analysis of the forms of action and interaction created by the media. He wanted to focus the types of interactional situation created by the mass media. He also wanted the analytical framework to examine some of the interactional features of the social relationships established by the media.

He created the concept in part of his theory of interaction. The 3 steps theory consisted of Face-to-Face interaction, Mediated Interaction and Mediated Quasi-Interaction. Face-to- people share time and space, since they are co-present and mediated interaction the sending of the message and its reception are separated in time and space.

Interactional Characteristics	Face-to-Face Interaction	Mediated Interaction	Mediated Quasi Interaction
Space-time constitution	Context of co-presence; shared spatial-temporal reference system	Separation of contexts; extended availability in time and space	Separation of contexts;extended availability in time and space
Range of symbolic cues	Multiplicity of symbolic cues	Narrowing of the range of symbolic cues	Narrowing of range of symbolic cues
Action Orientation	Oriented towards specific others	Oriented towards specific others	Oriented towards an indefinite range of potential recipients
Dialogical/monological	Dialogical	Dialogical	Monological

Thompson, 1995, Table 3.1

== Basic premises and approach ==
Mediated Quasi-interaction is monological in character and involves the production of symbolic forms for an indefinite range of potential recipients. Mediated Quasi-Interaction creates a certain kind of social situation in which individuals are linked together in a process of communication and symbolic exchange. It is a structured situation in which some individuals are engaged primarily in producing symbolic forms for others who are not physically present, while others are involved primarily in receiving symbolic forms produced to whom they cannot respond, but with whom they can form bonds of friendship, affection or loyalty.

Mediated quasi-interaction is based on social relations established by media of mass communications. With mass media being impossible to be genuine interactivity, Mediated quasi-interaction is simulated interaction. It is typical for the mass media to try to simulate interpersonal communication and to personalize their communication (ex. Call-ins). Another focus of Mediated Quasi-Interaction is also on its space-time constitution. It is described as a separation of contexts with extended availability in time and space.

Mediated Quasi-Interaction can also be combined with other interaction such as face-to-face. For example, people can sit in a room together and have a discussion while they are watching television. In a similar relation, a television program may involve face to face interaction with a panel and an audience, although the program remains primarily a form Mediated Quasi-Interaction.
