= Tobias Hecht =

American anthropologist, ethnographer, and translator

Tobias Hecht (born 18 February 1964) is an American anthropologist, ethnographer, and translator.

Hecht was born in Seattle, Washington. He received his B.A. from Columbia University in 1986 and his Ph.D. in Social Anthropology in 1995 from the University of Cambridge, and was the winner of the 2002 Margaret Mead Award, for his book At Home in the Street: Street Children of Northeast Brazil, an innovative study of street children in Northeastern Brazil.

In 2002–2003 he was the recipient of a Harry Frank Guggenheim Foundation research grant for his work on The violent life of Bruna Verissimo: An experimental ethnographic biography of a homeless Brazilian youth. His 2006 novel After Life: An Ethnographic Novel was based in part on that work.

In 2005 Hecht placed second in the Hucha de Oro, Spain's most important literary competition for short works of fiction. He taught at Pomona College.

== Selected bibliography ==
Publications

- After Life: An Ethnographic Novel, Duke University Press, March 2006. ISBN 0-8223-3788-6
- "La sexta columna" in Yardbird y otros cuentos : Concurso de Cuentos de las Cajas de Ahorros, XXXIII Convocatoria Hucha de Oro, octubre 2005, April 2006.
- At Home in the Street: Street Children of Northeast Brazil, Cambridge University Press, May 13, 1998. ISBN 0-521-59869-9
- El cerdito pulcro also entitled The Remarkably Clean Life of a Little Pig, a bilingual edition with illustrations by Cristina Perez Navarro, Ecologistas en Accion, (Madrid, Spain), October 2016. ISBN 978-84-944051-8-1
- Cangrejo con yogur also entitled Crab and Yogurt Pig, a bilingual edition, Valparaiso Ediciones, (Granada, Spain), January 2022. ISBN 978-8418694585

Edited books

- (with Isabel Balseiro) South Africa: A Traveler's Literary Companion, Whereabouts Press, August 11, 2009. ISBN 1-883513-22-7
- Minor Omissions: Children in Latin American History and Society, University of Wisconsin Press, September 7, 2002. ISBN 0-299-18034-4

Translations

- Cristina Peri Rossi, The Museum of Useless Efforts, University of Nebraska Press, April 2001. ISBN 0-8032-8764-X
