= 2000s in motorsport =

- 1990s
- 2000s in motorsport
- 2010s
Other topics in 2000s:
- Anthropology
- Comics
- Fashion
- Music
- Science and technology
- Sociology
- Television
- Video games

The new millennium saw many changes for motorsport. Not only were there technological developments, but also historic ones like NASCAR's severing of ties with the tobacco industry.

== North America ==
- Dodge replaces Pontiac in NASCAR as General Motors discontinues the brand. The Dodge Avenger is the vehicle of choice for the new brand.
- NASCAR severs ties with R.J. Reynolds after decades of sponsorship
- The United States Grand Prix returns in 2001 after almost a decade, being held at the Indianapolis Motor Speedway road course. It is held there until 2007, after which it is dropped again.
- The Canadian Grand Prix is dropped in 2008 after twenty years. It returns two years later.
- Watkins Glen International returns to the IndyCar Series for the first time since 1981. It is dropped in 2011, revived in 2016, and then dropped again in 2018.
- Sonoma Raceway becomes a regular on the IndyCar schedule. It will last until 2018, after which it is dropped in favor of WeatherTech Raceway Laguna Seca.
- The Chevrolet Camaro is discontinued in 2002. It will not return for eight years.
- The Dodge Challenger returns in 2008 based on the original model from the sixties.
- IMSA first holds an event at Circuit Gilles Villeneuve
- The Pontiac GTO returns based on the Holden Monaro. Due to bland styling and Pontiac's decreasing sales, the model is discontinued after only four years. During its run, it is used in the Rolex Sports Car Series and Grand Am Cup Series. The latter is now known as the Michelin Pilot Challenge.
- The Mercury Cougar is discontinued after over thirty years. Due to the brand's discontinuation, the model does not see a return
- The Pontiac Firebird is discontinued in 2002 alongside the Camaro. Due to the discontinuation of the Pontiac brand, the Firebird does not see a return.
- The Ford GT is introduced based on the Ford GT40, albeit as a grand tourer rather than a prototype. Unlike the GT40, the GT is not dominant in motorsport.
- The IndyCar Series drops all tobacco advertising
- After NASCAR legend Dale Earnhardt's horrific fatal death, NASCAR introduces the Car of Tomorrow in an attempt to develop a safer vehicle. This begins an era of NASCAR vehicles becoming more stock, today akin to grand tourers.
- Successful GT racing team K-Pax Racing is founded
- Debut of IndyCar legend Danica Patrick. Over the years she has tried to become the first woman to win the Indianapolis 500, but without success. Due to the attention gained by her attempts, she is added to a version of Sonic & Sega All-Stars Racing.
- The Detroit Grand Prix is dropped in 2001 after twenty years. It is revived in 2007 after six years. It is held until 2009. It is revived again three years later at Belle Isle as a doubleheader. It remained there until 2023 when it moved to a new circuit in downtown Detroit.
- Sports car legend Scott Pruett debuts.
- Debut of IndyCar star Dan Wheldon. He would compete until his death at Las Vegas Motor Speedway in 2011. This resulted in the introduction of the introduction of the HANS device
- Scott Speed becomes the first American F1 driver since Michael Andretti, joining in 2006. His career is shortlived, ending in 2007. He goes on to compete in IndyCar and NASCAR among other series.
- NASCAR hosts an event at Circuit Gilles Villeneuve
- The Indy Racing League and Champ Car World Series merge to become the IndyCar Series
- The Ford Thunderbird returns as a luxury roadster, but is quickly discontinued due to poor sales
- For 2001, the Talladega 500 returns. It subsequently reacquires its corporate sponsor the following year.
- After being in Formula One since the sixties, Ford withdraws as a supplier, but returns for 2003-2004.

== South America ==
- IndyCar legend Helio Castroneves makes his debut

== Europe ==
- The French Grand Prix is dropped in 2008 after over fifty years. It does not return until 2018.
- The Austrian Grand Prix is dropped in 2003. It does not return until 2014.
- The San Marino Grand Prix is dropped in 2006 after over twenty years. Imola Circuit will return to the calendar in 2020 in the form of the Emilia Romagna Grand Prix, initially as filler to replace events canceled by COVID-19
- The Bahrain Grand Prix debuts in 2004
- Kinetic Energy Recovery System is introduced in Formula One
- Bentley returns to the 24 Hours of Le Mans in 2003, winning for the first time since 1930 using a thinly-disguised Audi R8.
- The FIA bans the use of tobacco advertising from F1. Scuderia Ferrari and McLaren, however, eventually find ways to advertise tobacco subliminally.
- Debut of Formula One champion Fernando Alonso
- F1 legend Lewis Hamilton debuts
- Audi dominates for many years in endurance racing due to its diesel engines and pit strategies. Their streak ends in 2015 when Porsche Racing begins their dynasty and the FIA makes several rule changes.
- Debut of Formula One champion Jenson Button
- Morgan introduces the Aero 8, which becomes a competitive grand tourer. It is also their first modern designed car since before World War II.

== Asia ==
- The Chinese Grand Prix debuts in 2004.
- The Singapore Grand Prix debuts in 2008.
- The Acura NSX is discontinued in 2005 after about fifteen years. It does not return for over ten years.

== Middle East ==
- The Abu Dhabi Grand Prix debuts in 2009.
- The Turkish Grand Prix debuts 2005. It is held until 2011 and then dropped, returning in 2020.
- The Bahrain Grand Prix is first held.

== Central America ==
- From 2005 to 2008 the NASCAR Xfinity Series hosts an event at Autodromo Hermanos Rodriguez

== South Pacific ==
- IndyCar legend Scott Dixon makes his debut

== See also ==
- 2010s in motorsport
- 1990s in motorsport
