= Avtar Brah =

Ugandan-British sociologist

Avtar Brah is a Ugandan-British sociologist. She is Emeritus Professor of Sociology at Birkbeck, University of London, and a pioneer of diaspora studies.

== Life ==
Avtar Brah was born in the Punjab and grew up in Uganda. Her mother tongue was Punjabi, and she recalls reading the novelist Nanak Singh, the eighteenth-century poet Waris Shah and the contemporary poet Amrita Pritam as a young person. In the late 1960s she studied on a scholarship in the United States before coming to Britain in the early 1970s, where she worked as a researcher at the Ethnic Relations Unit at Bristol University. She was left a stateless refugee in Britain after Idi Amin's expulsion of Asians from Uganda. She began her PhD in the mid-1970s, researching Asian communities in Southall, and moved to Southall as a community worker when her research contract at Bristol University ended. She participated in a demonstration against the National Front at which hundreds of demonstrators were arrested, and was a founding member of the Southall Black Sisters.

Brah was a research associate at Leicester University from 1980 to 1982, and a lecturer at the Open University from 1982 to 1985, She joined Birkbeck in 1985 as a lecturer, eventually rising to the rank of professor there. She was also visiting professor at the University of California in 1992 and Cornell University in 2001.

Brah was appointed MBE in 2001, for services to race, gender and ethnic identity issues.

== Works ==
- Working choices: South Asian young Muslim women and the labour market. 1992.
- Cartographies of Diaspora: contesting identities. London; New York: Routledge, 1996.
- (ed. with Mary J. Hickman and Maírtín Mac an Ghaill) Thinking identities: ethnicity, racism, and culture. New York, N.Y.: St. Martin's Press, 1999..
- Global futures : migration, environment, and globalization. New York: St. Martin's Press, 1999.
- (ed. with Annie E. Coombes) Hybridity and its discontents : politics, science, culture. London: Routledge, 2000.
