= 2000s in comics =

- 1990s
- 2000s in comics
- 2010s
Other topics in 2000s:
- Anthropology
- Fashion
- Motorsport
- Music
- Science and technology
- Sociology
- Television
- Video games
