= 1990s in comics =

- 1980s
- 1990s in comics
- 2000s
Other topics in 1990s:
- Anthropology
- Fashion
- Motorsport
- Music
- Science and technology
- Sociology
- Television
- Video games

== Publications ==
=== 1992 ===
- Sailor Moon by Naoko Takeuchi debuts in Nakayoshi.

=== 1994 ===
Jack Kirby dies at age 76 of heart failure in his Thousand Oaks, California home.

=== 1996 ===
- The Avengers (volume 2) #1 – Marvel Comics
- Captain America (volume 2) #1 – Marvel Comics
- Fantastic Four (volume 2) #1 – Marvel Comics
- Iron Man (volume 2) #1 – Marvel Comics
- Onslaught: Marvel Universe – Marvel Comics
- Onslaught: X-Men – Marvel Comics

=== 1997 ===
- Heroes Reborn: The Return #1–4 – Marvel Comics
- Onslaught: Epilogue – Marvel Comics
- One Piece by Eiichiro Oda debuts in Weekly Shōnen Jump.

=== 1998 ===
- The Avengers (volume 3) #1 – Marvel Comics
- Captain America (volume 3) #1 – Marvel Comics
- Fantastic Four (volume 3) #1 – Marvel Comics
- Iron Man (volume 3) #1 – Marvel Comics
