= Mary Lindsay Elmendorf =

American applied anthropologist (1917-2017)

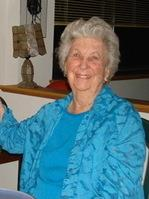
- Elmendorf c. 2011
- Born: April 13, 1917; Ruby, South Carolina, United States
- Died: September 15, 2017 (aged 100)
- Spouse(s): John van Gaasbeek Elmendorf (1937 -1980); John L. Landgraf (1981 - 2010)

Academic work
- Discipline: Anthropology; Psychology; Sociology; Social Work; Public Administration

Mary Lindsay Elmendorf (1917–2017) was an American applied anthropologist, recognized mainly for her work with the Mayan women of Mexico and her application of anthropology in consultation with technology. Her early work involved rural south and the slums of Boston and New Haven as well as in the Putney School in Vermont and Mexico. Her application of anthropology focused mainly on involving women with planning and implementation of suitable technologies for those women and others to choose and manage their development strategies.

== Life and education ==
Elmendorf met her first husband, John Elmendorf, as a student at the University of North Carolina at Chapel Hill; they married in December 1937. John Elmendorf died in 1980 and she eventually remarried Dr. John Landgraf (1914 - 2010).

She attended St. Pauls High School in 1933 and was a valedictorian. and earned her B.A. Psychology (1937) and her M.A. equivalent in Public Administration and Social Work (1941) at UNC-Chapel Hill. She graduated from school in Anthropology (1946 - 1948) and then attended Union Graduate School in 1972 earning a Ph.D. in Anthropology.

Elmendorf became affiliated with the American Anthropological Association, the Society for Applied Anthropology, the Association for the Advancement of Science, the AAUW, the United Nations Association of the US, the UNIFEM/Gulf Coast Chapter, and the Democratic Club. She volunteered with the American Friends Service Committee in 1944 - 1946. She was the head of the CARE office in Mexico (1952 - 1960) and became the first anthropologist hired by the World Bank (1975). Elmendorf was involved in various educator projects like Brown University (1962–65), Goddard College (1973), etc. Based on her work and application of anthropology, she aided at the United Nations Conferences on Women held in Mexico, Copenhagen, Nairobi, and Beijing.

Elmendorf died on September 15, 2017, at 100 years old

== Books and other publications ==
- Nine Mayan Women: A Village Face Change (1976)
- Appropriate Technology for Water Supply and Sanitation: Sociocultural Aspects of Water Supply and Excreta Disposal (1980)
- Water and Sanitation- Related Health Constraints on Women's Contributions to the Economic Development of Communities (1982)
- Public and Private Roles of Women in Water Supply and Sanitation Programs (1981)
- Priorities, challenges, and strategies: a feminine perspective (1996)
- Women Cross-Culturally: Change and Challenge (2011)
- From Southern Belle to Global Rebel: Memoirs of Anthropologist and Activist Mary Lindsay Elmendorf (2012)

== Nine Mayan Women ==
Elmendorf's best-known work, Nine Mayan Women, illustrates her case studies in the village of Chan Kom of Mayan women in the Yucatán Peninsula. The book studies nine women who are spoken about in chapter two. She covered background information on Chan Kom as well as the study itself. The rest of the book is a broader reflection of the preceding vignettes interwoven with mentions and attribution of other sources that relate to Mayan communities and culture. The main focus of her study was on the quality of life issues and the life satisfaction of Mayan women. In studying these aspects, she was able to see the Mayan women are happy and content with their lives and appear to value work as they also share a mutual respect with their husbands.

Her work has been reviewed by other scholars like Steffen W. Schmidt in Latin American Research Review. And influences other scholar's work like John G. Frazier (and others) in their book, Rights, resources, culture, and conservation in the land of the Maya.

== Awards ==
List of some awards received (all from the same source):

- 1947 Nobel Peace Prize (group award: British and American Quakers)
- 1981 Praxis Award
- 1982 Margaret Mead Award
- 1993 Distinguished Alumna Award
- 1996 Award (the United Nations Association of the United States of America Sarasota-Manatee Chapter)
- 1996 SULABH International Social Service Organization (And additional thanks for the donation of a collection of articles, technical reports, and other items to The Museum of the Toilet)
- 1997 Outstanding Alumna Award, Queens College
- 2007 PLACA- Lifetime Achievement Award
- 2009 Brown University (Honorary Degree as Doctor of Humane Letters)

== Leadership roles and honors ==
- 1975 - 1997 The World Bank - (as a Consulting Anthropologist)
- 1977 - 1979 Fellow Research Institute for the Study of Man (RISM)
- 1982 - 1997 United Nations Development Program, Division of Global and Interregional Projects
- 1982 - 1991 World Health Organization (WHO)
- 1980 - 1985 Water and Sanitation for Health Project (WASH), US Agency for International Development
- 1980 - 1982 Institute for Rural Water
- 1993 UNPFA Seminar "Women, Population and Environment"
- 1993 Participated in InterACTION Forum
- 1991 Facilitator, Global Assembly of Women and the Environment
- 1984 International Environmental Services (IES)
- 1980 Appropriate Designs for Basic Needs (ADBN) - ( Founder and Director and Independent Consultant)
- 1980 Program for the Introduction and Adaptation of Contraceptive Technology (PIACT) of Mexico - (Consultant)
- 1972 - 1990 U.S. Agency for International Development (USAID)
- 1960 - 1982 the Peace Corps, and the Overseas Education Fund of the League of Women Voters - (Consultant)
- 1963 - 1967 the Overseas Education Fund of the League of Women Voters - (Consultant)
- 1985 - 1995 International Development Research Centre, (IDRC)
- 1984 - 1986 Food and Agriculture Organization (FAO) of the UN

== See also ==
- American Anthropology
- American Anthropological Association
- Applied Anthropology
- Cultural Anthropology
- Cross-cultural studies
- Maya civilization
- Maya People
- Women in Maya society
- Water Supply
- History of water supply and sanitation
