= 1990s in science and technology =

- 1980s
- 1990s in science and technology
- 2000s
Other topics in 1990s:
- Anthropology
- Comics
- Fashion
- Motorsport
- Music
- Sociology
- Television
- Video games

This article is a summary of the 1990s in science and technology.

== Science timeline ==
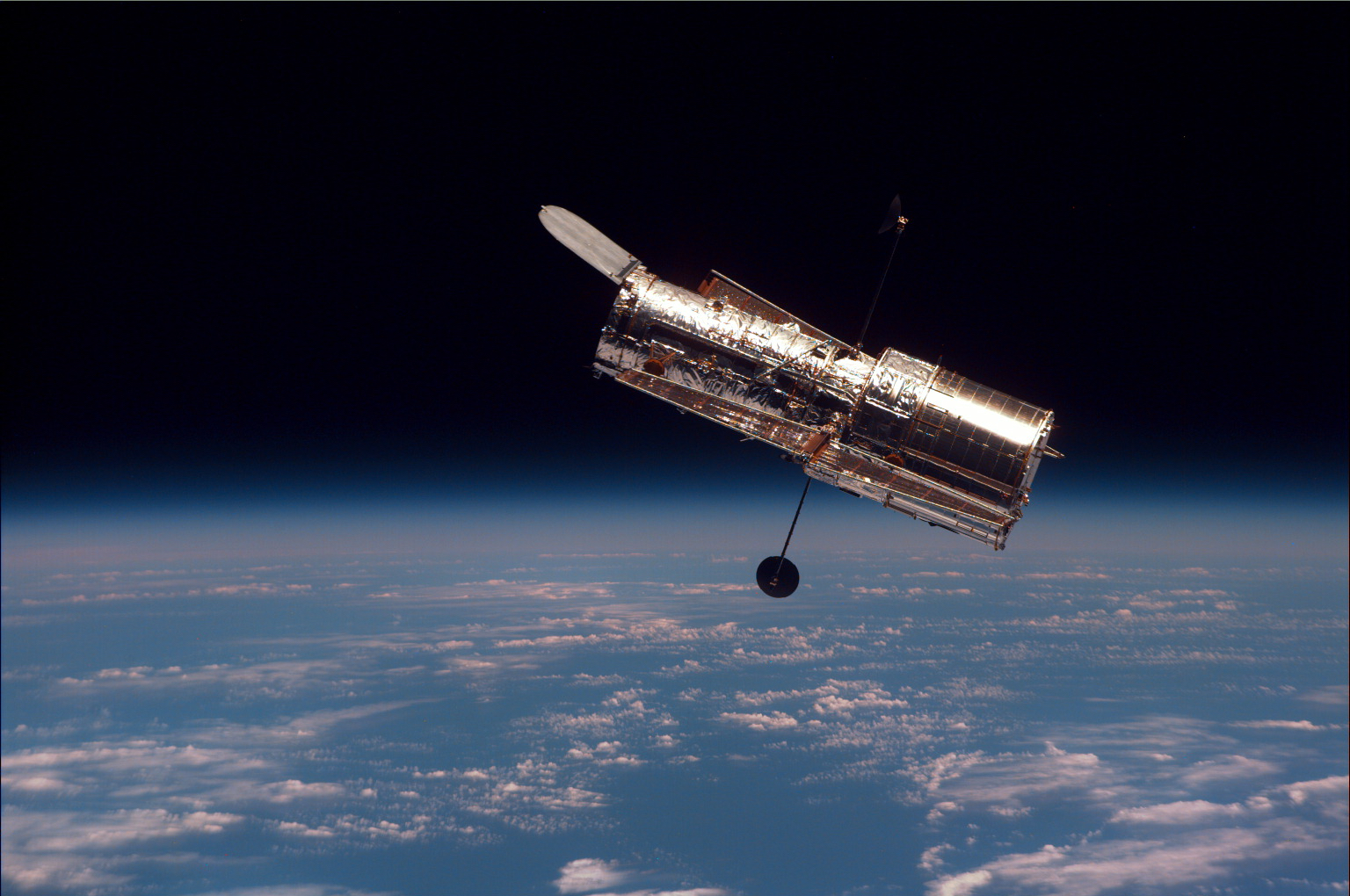
Hubble Space Telescope

- 1990
  - April - The Hubble Space Telescope is launched; revolutionizes astronomy.
  - September - The first successful somatic gene therapy trials begin.
  - October - Human Genome Project formally begins.
  - December 20 - The World Wide Web software is first tested by Tim Berners-Lee at CERN.
- 1992
  - January 14 - The first intracytoplasmic sperm injection in vitro fertilization produced baby is born by mechanically injecting a single, selected sperm cell into an egg.
  - Detection of extrasolar planets orbiting a pulsar is confirmed.
- 1994
  - The FlavrSavr tomato, the first genetically modified food sold in the United States is introduced.
  - The Oriental Pearl Tower is completed in Shanghai, China, representing the newfound wealth and investment present in eastern China.
- 1995
  - The Global Positioning System (GPS) becomes fully operational.
  - In April the NSFNET backbone is shut down, making the Internet a unified and "centerless" network without any restrictions on traffic types and essentially causing the Dot com bubble by attracting large-scale corporate investment in the Internet.
  - On June 5 the first Bose–Einstein condensates of Rubidium-87 and Sodium-23 are created at JILA and MIT.
  - In December the Galileo probe orbits Jupiter, studying the planet and its moons extensively.
- 1996
  - Dolly the sheep is cloned.
  - Construction starts on the International Space Station.
  - Google begins indexing the World Wide Web.
- 1997
  - April 1 - The Hale–Bopp comet swings past the Sun for the first time in 4,300 years and leads to the Heaven's Gate suicides.
  - July 4 - NASA's spacecraft Pathfinder lands on Mars and deploys a small roving vehicle, Sojourner, which analyzes the planet's geology and atmosphere.

== Technology ==
Some technologies invented and improved during the 1990s:

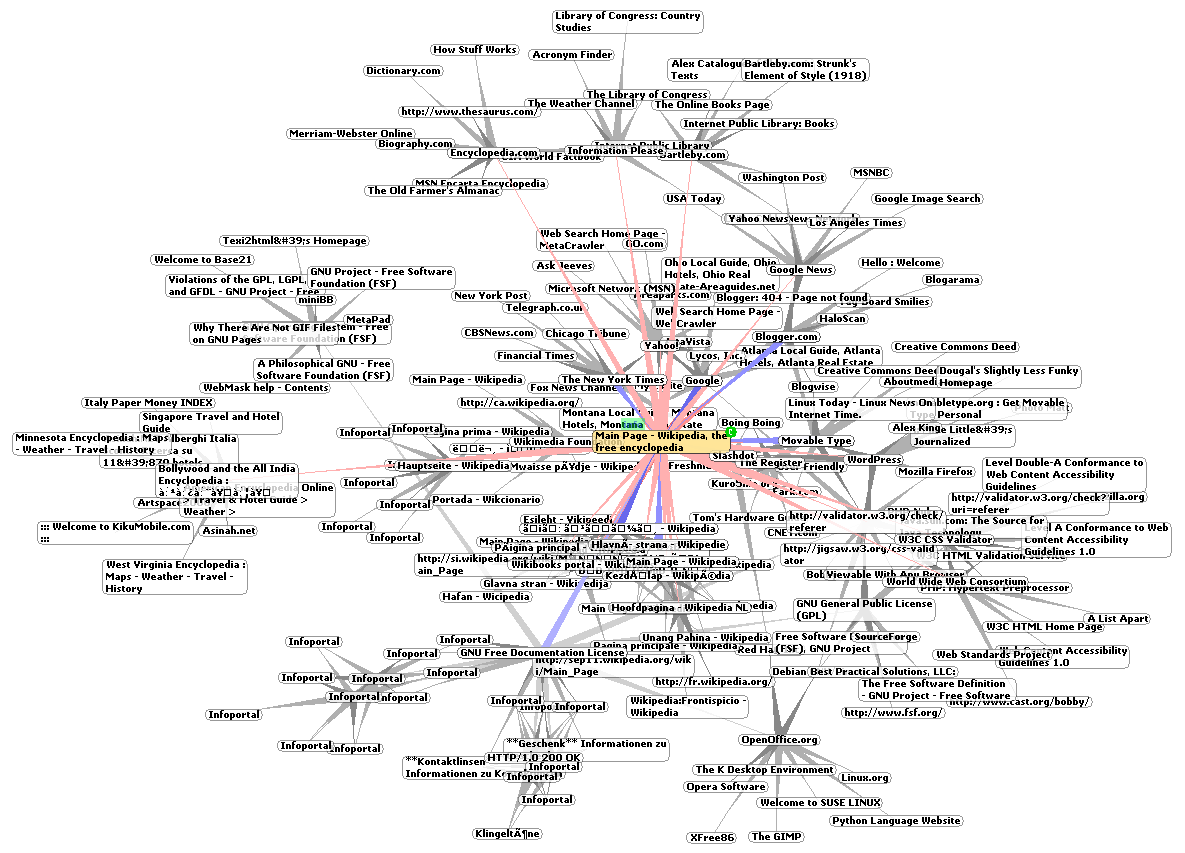
Graphic representation of the WWW

=== Software timeline ===
- December 1990 - The World Wide Web and its HTTP protocol and HTML language (a dialect of SGML until HTML5) are first successfully parsed by Tim Berners-Lee and eventually displace the Gopher protocol.
- 1991 - Development of the free Linux kernel is started by Linus Torvalds in Finland.
- 1995 - Microsoft introduces Windows 95, which gains immediate popularity and makes Windows the standard operating system for most PCs. Windows 98 is even more successful three years later.
- 1995 - The Java programming language is developed by Sun Microsystems (now Oracle).
- The Year 2000 problem (commonly known as Y2K), the computer glitch disaster expected to happen on January 1, 2000.
- The development of web browsers such as Netscape Navigator (originally known as Mosaic) in 1993 and Internet Explorer in 1995 makes surfing the World Wide Web easier and more user friendly.
- From 1994 onward, businesses start to build e-commerce websites; e-commerce-only companies such as Amazon.com, eBay, AOL, and Yahoo! grow rapidly.
- Email becomes popular; as a result Microsoft acquires the popular Hotmail webmail service.
- Instant messaging and the buddy list becomes popular. AIM and ICQ are two early protocols.

=== Video/audio ===
- Primitive digital cameras become commercially available by 1989/1990 and slowly become more affordable and appealing; mostly replacing traditional film by 2007.
- PDAs (Personal Digital Assistants) become popular in the mid-1990s with the release of the touchscreen Apple Newton in 1993, although it has a monochrome screen. Later in the late 1990s, the first full-color PDAs are released, but they consume a lot of battery life. These would gradually merge their features with mobile phones, leading to smartphones such as the iPhone.
- The compact disc, which debuted in the early 1980s but was not affordable until the early 1990s, makes the audiocassette and vinyl record less popular in most countries for listening to recorded music.
- DVDs become available in Japan in 1995 and the US in 1997, making video cassettes obsolete by the early 2000s.
- Plasma flat panel televisions become commercially available later in the decade, competing against CRT televisions.
- Full color flat panel computer monitors are released commercially to the public in the mid-to-late 1990s
- 1996 - USB ports are invented, allowing for computing devices to connect more easily. The USB flash drive debuts in December 2000.
- 1997 - Netflix is launched during the dial-up Internet era, offering DVDs mailed straight to one's home, which the user could select in an online queue. By 2007 it started to offer streaming directly from the Internet, making it a competitor to conventional network television.
- 1998 - The first portable MP3 player, the MPMan is released.
- 1999 - Digital video recorders such as TiVo, abbreviated as DVRs, debut.
- Active matrix laptop computers become popular and easier to afford.
- Satellite television becomes commonplace.

=== Communication ===
- TCP/IP (Internet) communication grows outside of academia and the military industrial complex into the realm of ordinary people, organizations and businesses, greatly bolstered by the Domain Name System and World Wide Web.
- 2G (2nd generation) mobile phones are launched.
- Automated teller machines become universally commonplace in many countries, revolutionizing banking.
- Text messaging as a mobile phone feature is first introduced in 1992, but does not see widespread use until the 2000s.
- Mobile phones become smaller and more affordable throughout the decade, being rare bulky devices everywhere in 1990 but affordable and common in Japan, the Nordic countries, Germany, the United States, Canada, Australia, New Zealand and the United Kingdom by 1999.
- Video telephones are released.

=== Gaming ===
- Home consoles become powerful and affordable enough to begin replacing trips to the arcade.
- CD-ROMs, which was first introduced as a software storage media with the 1988 launch of the PC Engine CD-ROM² System in Japan, gradually replaced ROM cartridges and floppy disks as the primary storage media for video games, starting with the release of platforms such as the Turbo Duo and Sega CD, later on with the PlayStation and the Sega Saturn, while CD-ROM drives for PCs became standardized. The sole exception was Nintendo, who canceled their plans to release a CD-ROM adapter for the Super NES and chose to employ cartridges for their subsequent home console, the Nintendo 64.
- Gaming, along with animation in general becomes more appealing to adults.
- Online multiplayer environments are popular over the internet during the later half of the 1990s. The first console with built-in Internet connectivity was the Dreamcast in 1999, which failed due to the low download speeds common at the time but eventually led to an online-centric gaming industry by the late 2000s.
- First-person shooter games become popular with the release of Doom (1993).
- 3D graphics overtake the traditional 2D graphics in the mid-nineties with the release of Quake and Super Mario 64 in 1996.
- The PlayStation is released in Japan on December 3, 1994 and in North America in September 1995.

=== Other ===
- By 1996 64 percent of K–12 schools in the United States had Internet access and 63 percent of American 12th graders reported using a computer for school work.
- The first hybrid vehicles are produced in 1997.
- High-end cars of the 1990s were installed with automatic doors, windows controlled with electric levers, GPS navigation, and CD drives.
- DNA identification of individuals, introduced in the late 1980s, finds wide application in criminal law.
- Protease inhibitors introduced in 1987 allowing HAART therapy against HIV become an important part of HIV treatment in the 1990s and help extend and save millions of lives.
- Discovery of dark matter, dark energy, brown dwarfs, and first confirmation of black holes.
- Proof of Fermat's Last Theorem is discovered by Andrew Wiles and completed in 1994.
- The remains of Myrtis and other victims of the Plague of Athens are found.

== See also ==
- 1990 in science
- 1991 in science
- 1992 in science
- 1993 in science
- 1994 in science
- 1995 in science
- 1996 in science
- 1997 in science
- 1998 in science
- 1999 in science
- 2000s in science and technology
- History of science and technology
- List of science and technology articles by continent
- List of years in science
