= 1990s in motorsport =

- 1980s
- 1990s in motorsport
- 2000s
Other topics in 1990s:
- Anthropology
- Comics
- Fashion
- Music
- Science and technology
- Sociology
- Television
- Video games

This page documents some of the events that happened in motorsport in the 1990s.

== United States ==
- The World Sports Car replaces the IMSA GT Prototype, creating the basis for the modern Le Mans Prototype
- The American Le Mans Series is established as the successor to the IMSA GT Championship. Its premier event is the ten-hour Petit Le Mans. The 24 Hours of Daytona and Six Hours of Watkins Glen go to a revived United States Road Racing Championship, shortly later to become the Rolex Sports Car Series.
- After having several Formula One races held in the United States in the eighties, the United States Grand Prix is dropped in 1992. It is not held again until 2000.
- Chrysler introduces the Dodge Viper, which goes on to become a successful grand tourer
- The Winston Cup Series is reduced to Chevrolet, Pontiac, and Ford by mid-decade after the Buick, Oldsmobile, and Mercury brands are dropped.
- The IndyCar Series is split into the Indy Racing League and the Champ Car World Series in 1995. This remains the status until they merge in 2008. The IRL is oval-oriented while Champ Car is road course oriented.
- The Grand Am Cup Series is established in 1997 following the demise of the IMSA Firehawk Series. It will undergo numerous changes over the decades before becoming the modern Michelin Pilot Challenge.
- The Ford Thunderbird is discontinued after over forty years. It will return in 2002 as a luxury convertible, but due to poor sales the model is discontinued after only four years.
- Racing legend Peter Cunningham makes his debut
- IMSA severs ties with Camel Cigarettes
- NASCAR superstar Jeff Gordon begins his career
- NASCAR superstar Bobby Labonte begins his career

== Central America ==
The Mexican Grand Prix is dropped from The F1 calendar in 1992. It is not held again until 2015.

== Europe ==
- The Luxembourg Grand Prix is held from 1997 to 1998 in order to have two F1 races in Germany.
- From 1995 to 1996 and again beginning in 1999 the European Grand Prix is moved to the Nürburgring in order to have two races in Germany. This will become the standard until 2008 when it is moved to Spain, a place it had been held at a few times during the nineties in order to have two races there.
- The Austrian Grand Prix returns in 1997 after a ten-year hiatus. It is held until 2003.
- The Portuguese Grand Prix is dropped from the calendar in 1996 after over ten years on the calendar. It does not return until 2020.
- The debut of Formula One legend Michael Schumacher
- Lotus leaves F1 after four decades. It is not seen again until 2010.

== Asia ==
- The Pacific Grand Prix is held from 1994 to 1995 in order to have two F1 races in Japan.
- The IndyCar Series introduces the Indy Japan 300. It is held until 2011.
- The F1 Malaysian Grand Prix is first held. It will last until 2017.

== Australia ==
- The IndyCar Series introduces the Surfers Paradise Grand Prix. It is held until 2008.
- V8 Supercars debuts as a high performance racing series in Australia.

== Africa ==
- The South African Grand Prix is held in 1992, the first time since 1985. It is held again the following year and then dropped after that.

== South America ==
- The Argentine Grand Prix is held in 1995, the first time in about fifteen years. It is held again for two more years and then dropped after that.

== See also ==
- 1980s in motorsport
- 2000s in motorsport
