= Arnold Epstein =

American health scholar

Arnold Epstein is an American health scholar, currently the John H. Foster Professor of Health Policy and Management at Harvard T.H. Chan School of Public Health. He has had over 20 authored or co-authored papers cited each over 100 and 1,000 times, starting with his currently highest one published in 1991.

== Education ==
He earned his M.D. at Duke University before joining the Clinton administration in 1993-94 to work on health reform. He also earned degrees at Dartmouth College, University of Rochester and Harvard University.

== Selected publications ==
- Joynt KE, De Lew N, Sheingold SH1, Conway PH1, Goodrich K1, Epstein AM. Should Medicare Value-Based Purchasing Take Social Risk into Account? New England Journal of Medicine, 2017.
- Fullerton CA, Epstein AM, Frank RG, et al. Medication use and spending trends among children with ADHD in Florida's Medicaid program, 1996–2005. Psychiatric Services, 2012
- Fullerton CA, Busch AB, Normand S-LT, et al. Ten-Year Trends in Quality of Care and Spending for Depression: 1996–2005. Archives of General Psychiatry, 2011.
