= Wenda Trevathan =

American anthropologist (born 1947)

- Born: June 7, 1947; Las Cruces, New Mexico
- Title: Regents Professor (emerita)
- Awards: Margaret Mead Award - 1990

Academic background
- Education: University of North Carolina, Chapel Hill (BA with hons.), University of Colorado, Boulder (M.A., Ph.D.)

Academic work
- Discipline: biological anthropology
- Institutions: New Mexico State University; School for Advanced Research
- Website: anthropology.nmsu.edu/anthropology-faculty/trevathan.html

Wenda Trevathan is an American biological anthropologist and professor emerita of anthropology at New Mexico State University. Her work covers topics including the evolution of human childbirth and evolutionary medicine. In 2019, Trevathan was named as a fellow to the American Association for the Advancement of Science. In 2021, Trevathan joined the School for Advanced Research as a senior scholar.

== Awards ==
- Margaret Mead Award — 1990

== Bibliography ==
=== Author ===
- Ancient Bodies, Modern Lives : How Evolution has Shaped Women's Health.Oxford University Press 2010 ISBN 9780195388886
- Human Birth: An Evolutionary Perspective. Routledge 2011 ISBN 9781412848190
- Introduction to Physical Anthropology (with Robert Jurmain, Lynn Kilgore, Russell Ciochon and Eric Bartelink) Cengage 2018 (15th edition) ISBN 9781337115704

=== Editor ===
- Evolutionary Medicine. (co-edited with E. O. Smith and James J. McKenna) Oxford University Press. 1999 ISBN 0195103556
- Costly and Cute: Helpless Infants and Human Evolution (co-edited with Karen R. Rosenberg) University of New Mexico Press. 2016 ISBN 9780826357458
