= Sarah Nettleton =

British sociologist

Sarah Nettleton FBA (born 1960) is a British sociologist and emeritus Professor at the University of York.

She grew up in the Lake District and studied for her undergraduate degree in Social Studies at the University of Newcastle graduating in 1982. After these studies she received a Manpower Services Commission role at Dove Cottage as a researcher. Nettleton then moved to London, working first for the Directorate of Housing in Tower Hamlets and then at King's College London, where she also gained her PhD researching the sociology of dentistry. She joined the University of York in 1993.

Nettleton was elected as a Fellow of the British Academy in 2021.

== Selected publications ==
- Locock, L., Nettleton, S., Kirkpatrick, S., Ryan, S., & Ziebland, S. (2016). "‘I knew before I was told’: Breaches, cues and clues in the diagnostic assemblage". Social Science & Medicine, 154, 85–92.
- Buse, C., Nettleton, S. J., Martin, D., & Twigg, J. (2016). "Imagined bodies: Architects and their constructions of later life". Ageing and society.
- Nettleton, S. (2013) Sociology of Health and Illness Cambridge. Polity Press.
- Neale, J., Nettleton, S. & Pickering, L. (2012) The Everyday Lives of Recovering Heroin Users. RSA.
- Taylor, K., Nettleton, S. and Harding, G. (2003) Sociology for Pharmacists. Taylor and Francis.
- Ford, J. Burrows, R. and Nettleton, S. (2001) Home Ownership in a Risk Society: A Social Analysis of Mortgage Arrears and Possession. Policy Press.
- Nettleton, S. (1992) Power, Pain and Dentistry Buckingham Open University Press.
- Twigg, J., Wolkowitz, C., Cohen, R. L. and Nettleton, S. (2011) (eds) Body Work in Health and Social Care: critical themes and agendas. Wiley-Blackwell.
