= Anne Allison =

Professor of cultural anthropology

Anne Allison is a professor of cultural anthropology at Duke University in the United States, specializing in contemporary Japanese society. She wrote the book Nightwork on hostess clubs and Japanese corporate culture after having worked at a hostess club in Tokyo.

She received her BA from the University of Illinois at Chicago and her Ph.D. in anthropology from the University of Chicago in 1986.

== Work ==
Allison's work investigates the intersection between the political economy and the imaginative dreamworld(s) of day-to-day Japanese life. Her first book, Nightwork: Sexuality, Pleasure, and Corporate Masculinity in a Tokyo Hostess Club (University of Chicago Press 1994), examines the Japanese corporate practice of entertaining white-collar, male workers in the sexualized atmosphere of hostess clubs.

Her second book, Permitted and Prohibited Desires: Mothers, Comics, and Censorship in Japan (Westview-HarperCollins 1996, reissued by University of California Press 2000) studies the intersection of motherhood, productivity, and mass-produced fantasies in contemporary Japan through essays on lunch-boxes, comics, censorship, and stories of mother-son incest.

Allison's third book, Millennial Monsters: Japanese Toys and the Global Imagination (California, 2006), analyzes the interplay of fantasy, capitalism, and cultural politics in the rise of "J-cool" (Japan's brand of "cool" youth goods) on the global marketplace. A Japanese edition of this book was published in 2010 by Shinchosha Press under the title Kiku to Pokémon: Guro-barusuru nihon no bunkaryōuku.

How the Japanese experience insecurity in their daily and social lives is the subject of her fourth book Precarious Japan. Tacking between the structural conditions of socioeconomic life and the ways people are making do, or not, Anne Allison chronicles the loss of home affecting many Japanese, not only in the literal sense but also in the figurative sense of not belonging. Until the collapse of Japan's economic bubble in 1991, lifelong employment and a secure income were within reach of most Japanese men, enabling them to maintain their families in a comfortable middle-class lifestyle. Now, as fewer and fewer people are able to find full-time work, hope turns to hopelessness and security gives way to a pervasive unease. Yet some Japanese are getting by, partly by reconceiving notions of home, family, and togetherness.

== Duke lacrosse case ==
Allison was a leading faculty figure during the Duke lacrosse case. She is noted for being among the "Group of 88" Duke professors and faculty who published an ad condemning the Duke lacrosse team, three of whose members were accused of rape but ultimately found innocent. The backlash from the letter led to the disclosure that Allison and other Duke members of the anthropology department were reprimanded in 2003 by Provost Peter Lange for misuse of university funds in 2003 for the publication of a political ad.

In 2007, during the Duke controversy, Allison offered a course entitled "Hook-Up Culture at Duke" which intended to examine what "the lacrosse scandal tell[s] us about power, difference, and raced, classed, gendered and sexed normativity in the U.S." She was criticized for offering this course, given that facts made public in the case had already established that the lacrosse team was innocent of all charges. "For Group members," wrote the authors of a book on the rape scandal, "pretending that a rape had occurred was apparently preferable to facing the facts." The National Review reported that when "an engineering professor saw the syllabus" for the "Hook-Up" course and asked about it, Allison said "'The very query seemed hostile. I mean, I'm not asking him about his class,' she told The Chronicle of Higher Education."

== Books ==
- Nightwork: Sexuality, Pleasure, and Corporate Masculinity in a Tokyo Hostess Club (1994)
- Permitted and Prohibited Desires: Mothers, Comics, and Censorship in Japan (1995)
- Millennial Monsters: Japanese Toys and the Global Imagination (2006)
- Precarious Japan (2013)
- Being Dead Otherwise (2023)
