= Les Back =

English academic

Les Back (born 17 December 1962) is a professor of sociology at the University of Glasgow and former director of the Centre for Urban and Community Research at Goldsmiths, University of London. He is a researcher and author of books and academic studies on topics including racism, music and urban cultures.

== Biography ==
Les Back was born in Croydon, South London. Back's first job was as a youth worker. He studied at both undergraduate and postgraduate level at Goldsmiths, University of London, receiving his PhD in social anthropology in 1991. He subsequently worked at the Institute of Education, Birkbeck College and the Department of Cultural Studies, University of Birmingham before returning to Goldsmiths in 1993.

== Key studies ==
Back is the author of the following books:

- The Art of Listening (2007)
- Out of Whiteness: Color, Politics and Culture (2003 with Vron Ware)
- The Changing Face of Football: Racism, Identity and Multiculture in the English Game (2001) with T Crabbe and J. Solomos
- New Ethnicities and Urban Culture: Racisms and Multiculture in Young Lives(1996)
- Racism and Society (1996 with John Solomos)
- Race, Politics and Social Change (1995 with John Solomos).

Back has edited three books: The Auditory Cultures Reader (2003 with Michael Bull), Theories of Race and Racism: A Reader (2000 with John Solomos) and (1993) (co-editor with Anoop Nayak) Invisible Europeans?: Black people in the 'New Europe' (1993 with Anoop Nayak).

Back's work focuses on the issues of race, racism, popular culture and belonging, discussed with ethnographic research often based in South London. Back is also a regular contributor to The Guardian, Times Higher Education Supplement and the New Humanist as well as contributing to online magazines including openDemocracy.net, Eurozine and The Sociological Review.

== Bibliography ==
- (2011) 'Academic Diary'
- (2008) 'Sociologist's Talking', Sociological Research on-line
- (2008) "Beaches and graveyards": Europe's haunted borders, Eurozine
- (2008) "An ordinary virtue", New Jewish Thought,
- (2006) 'Phobocity' Eurozine
- (2007) The Art of Listening Oxford and New York: Berg Publishers
- (2007) Written in Stone Working Papers Goldsmiths, University of London, London
- (2003) (co-editor with Michael Bull) The Auditory Cultures Reader Oxford: Berg
- (2002) (co-author with Vron Ware) Out of Whiteness: Color, Politics and Culture Chicago and London: University of Chicago Press
- (2001) (co-author with T Crabbe and J. Solomos) The Changing Face of Football: Racism, Identity and Multicuture in the English Game Oxford: Berg
- (2001) Love's Repair, Opendemcoracy
- (2000) (co-editor with John Solomos) Theories of Race and Racism: A Reader London: Routledge
- (1996) New Ethnicities and Urban Culture: Racisms and Multiculture in Young Lives London: UCL Press
- (1996) (co-author with John Solomos) (1996) Racism and Society Basingstoke: Macmillan Press Ltd
- (1995) (co-author with John Solomos) Race, Politics and Social Change London & New York: Routledge
- (1993) (co-editor with Anoop Nayak) Invisible Europeans?: Black people in the 'New Europe' Birmingham: AFFOR

== Sources ==
Written in Stone (2008) Sociology Working papers, Goldsmiths, University of London https://web.archive.org/web/20081024024020/http://www.sussex.ac.uk/sociology/1-4-11.html
