= Morris Berman =

American historian (born 1944)

- Born: August 3, 1944 (age 82); Rochester, New York, U.S.
- Citizenship: US (born); Mexico (resides)
- Education: Cornell University (BA, Mathematics, 1966); Johns Hopkins University (PhD, History of Science, 1971)
- Occupations: Educator, scholar, writer
- Writing career
- Language: English, Spanish
- Notable works: The Reenchantment of the World (1981); Coming to Our Senses (1989); The Twilight of American Culture (2000); Why America Failed (2011); Neurotic Beauty (2015)
- Notable awards: Rollo May Center Grant (1992) Neil Postman Award (2013)
- Website: Dark Ages America

Morris Berman (born August 3, 1944) is an American historian and social critic. He earned a BA in mathematics at Cornell University in 1966 and a PhD in the history of science at Johns Hopkins University in 1971. Berman is an academic humanist cultural critic who specializes in Western cultural and intellectual history.

== Life and work ==
Berman has served on the faculties of a number of universities in the U.S., Canada, and Europe. Berman emigrated from the U.S. to Mexico in 2006, where he was a visiting professor at the Tecnologico de Monterrey in Mexico City from 2008 to 2009. During this period he continued writing for various publications including Parteaguas, a quarterly magazine.

Berman has written several books for a general audience. They deal with the state of Western civilization and with an ethical, historically responsible, or enlightened approach to living within it. His work emphasizes the legacies of the European Enlightenment and the historical place of present-day American culture, in particular “exploring the corrosion of American society and the decline of the American empire.”

He wrote a trilogy on consciousness and spirituality, published between 1981 and 2000, and another trilogy on the American decline, published between 2000 and 2011. Book reviewer George Scialabba commented:

Most historians would be content to have written one deeply researched and interpretively wide-ranging trilogy on a large and important subject. Berman has written two... The second trilogy, a grimly fascinating inventory of the pathologies of contemporary America and an unsparing portrait of American history and national character, is a masterpiece.

=== Participating consciousness ===
The term participating consciousness was introduced by Berman in The Re-enchantment of the World (1981) expanding on Owen Barfield's concept of "original participation," to describe an ancient mode of human thinking that does not separate the perceiver from the world he or she perceives. Berman says that this original world view has been replaced during the past 400 years with the modern paradigm called Cartesian, Newtonian, or scientific, which depends on an isolated observer, proposing that we can understand the world only by distancing ourselves from it.

Max Weber, early 20th-century German sociologist, was concerned with the "disenchantment" he associated with the rise of modernity, capitalism, and scientific consciousness. Berman traces the history of this disenchantment. He argues that the modern consciousness is destructive to both the human psyche and the planetary environment. Berman challenges the supremacy of the modern world view and argues for some new form of the older holistic tradition, which he describes as follows:

"Participating consciousness" involves merger, or identification, with one's surroundings, and bespeaks a psychic wholeness that has long since passed from the scene. Alchemy, as it turns out, was the last great coherent expression of participating consciousness in the West."

== Recognition ==
In 1990, Berman received the Governor's Writers Award (Washington State) for his book Coming to Our Senses. In 1992, he was the recipient of the first annual Rollo May Center Grant for Humanistic Studies. In 2000, Berman's book The Twilight of American Culture received critical acclaim. It was named one of the ten most recommended books of the year by the Christian Science Monitor and was named a "Notable Book" by The New York Times. In 2013 he received the "Neil Postman Award for Career Achievement in Public Intellectual Activity" from the Media Ecology Association. Berman moved to Mexico in 2006 where he continues to reside as of 2026.

== Selected bibliography ==
- Social Change & Scientific Organization: The Royal Institution 1799–1844. 1978. – nonfiction
- The Reenchantment of The World. 1981. – nonfiction
- Coming to Our Senses: Body and Spirit in the Hidden History of the West. 1989. —nonfiction
- Wandering God: A Study in Nomadic Spirituality. 2000. – nonfiction
- The Twilight of American Culture. 2000. – nonfiction
- Dark Ages America: The Final Phase of Empire. 2006. – nonfiction
- A Question of Values. 2010. – essay collection – nonfiction
- Destiny. 2010. – fiction (a collection of three novellas)
- Counting Blessings. 2011. – poetry collection
- Why America Failed: The Roots of Imperial Decline. 2011. – nonfiction
- Spinning Straw Into Gold: Straight Talk for Troubled Times. 2013. – a philosophical memoir – nonfiction
- Neurotic Beauty: An Outsider Looks At Japan. 2015. – nonfiction
- The Man Without Qualities. 2016. – fiction (a novel)
- Are We There Yet?: Essays & Reflections, 2010-2017. 2017. – essay collection – nonfiction
- Genio: The Story of Italian Genius. 2019. – nonfiction
- The Heart of the Matter. 2020. – fiction (short story collection)
- Eminent Post-Victorians: Portraits of Genius. 2022. – nonfiction
- Healing: The Defining Root of Our Existence. 2023. – nonfiction
- The Soul of Russia: From Pushkin to Tarkovsky. 2023. – nonfiction
- The Crisis of Our Time. 2024. – nonfiction
- Soul-Changers: Great American Poets, and What They Ask of Us. 2024. – nonfiction
- Against Civilization: The Anthropological Critique of Modernity. 2025. – nonfiction
- Reaching for Utopia. 2025. – fiction (a novel)
- They Took Him Away in a Wagon. 2025. – fiction (a novel)
- Empire's End. 2025. – fiction (a novel)
- The Girl in the Cafe. 2025. – fiction (a novel)
- Weisheit: The Wisdom of Germany. 2025. – nonfiction
- Thoughts for a Rain Day. 2026. – nonfiction
- Thinking Otherwise: The Power of Alternatives. 2026. – nonfiction
- Moving On: Poems, Essays, Short Stories, and Other Fragments. 2026. – fiction/poetry collection
- The Legacy of Greece. 2026. – nonfiction
