= Software testing outsourcing =

Software testing outsourcing is software testing carried out by an independent company or a group of people not directly involved in the process of software development.

Software testing is an essential phase of software development. However, it is often viewed as a non-core activity for most organizations. Outsourcing enables an organization to concentrate on its core development activities while external software testing experts handle the independent validation work. This offers many business benefits, which include independent assessment leading to enhanced delivery confidence, reduced time to market, lower infrastructure investment, predictable software quality, de-risking of deadlines, and increased time to focus on development.

Software testing outsourcing can come in different forms:

- Full outsourcing, insourcing or remote insourcing of the entire test process (strategy, planning, execution, and closure), often referred to as a Managed Testing Service or dedicated testing teams.
- Provision of additional resources for major projects
- One-off tests often related to loading, stress or performance testing
- Beta User Acceptance Testing. Utilizing specialist focus groups coordinated by an external organization

Software testing outsourcing is utilized when a company does not have the resources or capabilities in-house to address testing needs. Outsourcing can be given to organizations with expertise in many areas, including testing software for the web, mobile, printing, or even Fax performance. Testing companies can provide outsourcing services located in the home country of business or many other onshore or offshore sites. A testing partner could mean someone in the same city or another city across the country. It could also mean onshore but rurally sourced. Near-shore options are located in the same time-zone but cheaper markets like Mexico, while offshore testing usually takes place in countries like the Caribbean, Ukraine, and India.

- Onshore testing – Software testing companies based in the US and typically include Canada. Onshore often refers to your home country.
- Offshore testing – Software testing companies in a country other than your home country.
- Near-shore – Software testing companies located outside of the home country but in the same or similar time zone.

Software testing offshore is considered more ideal when pricing is a key factor and when the task is simple enough for lesser experienced staff with limited direction. Offshore is also a more common choice when there can be tight coordination and time zone overlap is not an impediment. If the testing is more complicated and requires focused coordination and frequent interfacing with internal teams, onshore services will be more critical. Security and cultural alignment are also important factors that are most often satisfied by an onshore partner.

Pros of software testing outsourcing onshore:

- On-hand information: Fluid and first-hand information from throughout the process.
- Face-to-face communication: enables on-time detection of emerging issues and efficient problem-solving.
- Effective communication: With no time and distance gap or cultural differences, there are almost no misunderstandings within teams.
- Time-effectiveness: Real-time work model with no time zone delays ensures efficiencies.
- Enhanced Time to market: Based on all of the above, speed to market is guaranteed.

Pros of software testing outsourcing offshore:

- Best choice for long-term projects: The results are typical but not proven.
- Low costs: The cost of IT projects can be cheaper when outsourced to countries with low labor costs.
- Round-the-clock support: Typically, offshore testing companies offer 24/7 support services.
- Fast Scalability: Access to a large pool of resources capable of fast test activation.

A hybrid approach is software testing outsourcing offshore in execution with onshore over-site. Some companies offer an onshore, local project lead to oversee an offshore outsourced team.

Advantages of onsite-offshore outsourced testing model:

- If used right, this model can ensure that there is work going on every minute of the 24 hours on a project.
- Direct client interaction helps in better communication and also improves the business relationship.
- Cost-effective – Offshore teams cost less than setting up the entire QA team onsite.
- Considerations of the time zone differences and manage expectations accordingly.

== Top established global outsourcing cities ==
According to Tholons Global Services - Top 50, in 2009, Top Established and Emerging Global Outsourcing Cities in Testing function were:

1. Bengaluru, India
2. Cebu City, Philippines
3. Shanghai, China
4. Beijing, China
5. Kraków, Poland
6. Ho Chi Minh City, Vietnam

== Vietnam outsourcing ==
Vietnam has become a major player in software outsourcing. Ho Chi Minh City has developed a software outsourcing industry, with factors including its business environment, political and labor conditions, and increasing number of English speakers.

Vietnam's software industry has maintained annual growth rate of 30-50% during the past 10 years. From 2002 to 2013 revenue of the software industry increased to nearly 3 US$ billion and the hardware industry increased to 36.8 US$ billion. Many Vietnamese enterprises have been granted international certificates (CMM) for their software development.

According to Global Services Location Index 2017 by A.T. Kearney, Vietnam ranks sixth in the global software outsourcing market. Vietnam's position in this year's index reflects its growing popularity for Business process outsourcing (BPO). Its BPO industry earned US$2 billion in 2015 and has annually grown by 20-25% in the past decade.

== Argentina outsourcing ==
Argentina's software industry is one of the country's strategic economic sectors. Because Argentina is only one hour ahead of the U.S. East Coast, communication can take place in real time. Argentina ranks third worldwide in Facebook penetration and has a smartphone penetration rate of 24%. The internet contributes to 2.2% of Argentina's gross national product, placing the country 10th in the world.

== India outsourcing ==
India's software outsourcing industry plays a critical role in the country's economy, contributing significantly to its Gross Domestic Product (GDP). As of 2021, the Information Technology and Business Process Management (IT-BPM) sector in India accounted for approximately 8% of the country's GDP. The sector also employed over 4.5 million people, making it one of the largest private-sector employers in the country. India's outsourcing industry is dominated by software services, which contributed about US$150 billion to the country's export revenues, according to the Economic Times.
