= Anoop Nayak =

British academic

Anoop Nayak is a British academic, and a professor in social and cultural geography at Newcastle University. He specialises in race, ethnicity and migration, masculinities and social change, and youth inequalities, structures and cultures.

Nayak studied at the Centre for Contemporary Cultural Studies (CCCS), University of Birmingham, and earned a PhD in human geography at Newcastle University about young people, race and whiteness.

Nayak was a lecturer in media and cultural studies at Liverpool John Moores University, and then a lecturer in human geography at Newcastle University before becoming a professor there.

== Publications ==
- Gender, Youth and Culture, with Mary Jane Kehily
