= Máirtín Mac an Ghaill =

British sociologist

Academic background
- Education: University of Aston

Academic work
- Institutions: Newman University, Birmingham
- Main interests: Sociology, education
- Notable works: The Making of Men: Masculinities, Sexuality and Schooling

Máirtín Mac an Ghaill is a social and educational theorist. He is the author of The Making of Men: Masculinities, Sexualities and Schooling, The RoutledgeFalmer Reader in Gender and Education (ed) (with Madeline Arnot), Education and Masculinities and Contemporary Racisms and Ethnicities.

He did his undergraduate degree at University of Liverpool and his MSc and PhD at the University of Aston. He was professor at the University of Birmingham, University of Sheffield and Newcastle University.

== Academic interests ==
His research interests that are interrelated are:

Developing a critical understanding of teaching and learning

Changing pedagogies and policies:achieving social equity

Rethinking future work on education

He has recently completed Education and Masculinities: Social, Cultural and Global Transformations. He has recently been a joint director of a Joseph Rowntree Foundation funded project exploring Bangladeshi young people, ethnicity and transition to adulthood. He is currently working with postgraduate students from China, Taiwan and Japan on: global masculinities, migration, cultural identity and diversity.

Currently at Newman University he is a professor and the Director of Graduate School.

== Selected publications ==
=== Books ===
- Mac an Ghaill, Máirtín (1994). The making of men: masculinities, sexualities and schooling. Buckingham Philadelphia: Open University Press. ISBN 9780335157815.
- Mac an Ghaill, Máirtín (2000). Contemporary racisms and ethnicities: social and cultural transformations. Buckingham: Open University Press. ISBN 9780335196722.
- Mac an Ghaill, Máirtín (1999). Contemporary racisms and ethnicities: social and cultural transformations. Buckingham England Philadelphia: Open University Press. ISBN 9780335196722.
- Mac an Ghaill, Máirtín; Brah, Avtar; Hickman, Mary J. (2000). Thinking identities: ethnicity, racism and culture. London: Macmillan. ISBN 9780333717745.
- Mac an Ghaill, Máirtín; Brah, Avtar; Hickman, Mary J. (2000). Global futures: migration, environment and globalisation. London: Macmillan. ISBN 9780333717769.
- Mac an Ghaill, Máirtín; Haywood, Chris (2003). Men and masculinities: theory, research and social practice. Buckingham: Open University Press. ISBN 9780335208913.
- Mac an Ghaill, Máirtín; Arnot, Madeleine (2006). The RoutledgeFalmer reader in gender and education. London: Routledge. ISBN 9781574444902.
- Mac an Ghaill, Máirtín; Haywood, Chris (2007). Gender, culture and society. London: Macmillan. ISBN 9780333987841.
- Mac an Ghaill, Máirtín; Haywood, Chris (2013). Education and masculinities: social, cultural and global transformations. London: Routledge. ISBN 9780415593106.
- Lin, X.; Haywood, C. and Mac an Ghaill, M. (2016) East Asian Men: Masculinity, Sexuality and Desire. London: Palgrave Macmillan.
- Man an Ghaill, M. and Haywood, C. (2017) Muslim Students, Education and Neo-liberalism: Schooling as 'Suspect Community'. London: Palgrave Macmillan.

=== Recent chapters in books ===
- Haywood, C. and Mac an Ghaill, M. (2015) ‘Critical Masculinity Studies’, in S. Sim (ed.) European Companion to Critical Theory. London: Routledge.
- Mac an Ghaill, M. & Haywood, C. (2016) (Dis)locating masculinities: ethnographic reflections of British Muslim young men. In Karioris, F. et al. (eds.) Masculinities under Neoliberalism. (pp. 198–212). London: Zed Books.
- Chen, B. and Mac an Ghaill, M. (2016) Negotiating family/filial responsibilities: reflexivity, tradition, and Taiwanese (young) professional men. In Lin X. et al. (ends.) East Asian Men: Masculinity, Sexuality and Desire. (pp. 51–68), London: Palgrave.
- Mac an Ghaill, M. & Haywood, C. (2017) Educating Muslim Students: Late modernity, masculinity, inclusion/exclusion and the neoliberal school. In Mac an Ghaill, M. and Haywood, C. (eds.) Muslim Students, Education and Neoliberalism. (pp. 199–216) London: Palgrave.
- Lin, X.; Mac an Ghaill, M. (2017) (Re)-masculinizing ‘suzhi jiaoyu’ (education for quality): aspirational values of modernity in neoliberal China. In Stahl, G. et al. (eds.) Masculinity and Aspiration: International Perspectives in the Era of Neoliberal Education. London: Routledge.

=== Recent selected journal articles ===
- Mac an Ghaill, Máirtín; Haywood, Chris (September 2014). "Pakistani and Bangladeshi young men: re-racialization, class and masculinity within the neo-liberal school". British Journal of Sociology of Education. 35 (5): 753–776. doi:10.1080/01425692.2014.919848. S2CID 144368999.
- Mac an Ghaill, Máirtín; Haywood, Chris (January 2015). "British born Pakistani and Bangladeshi young men: exploring unstable concepts of Muslim, Islamophobia and racialization". Critical Sociology. 41 (1): 97–114. doi:10.1177/0896920513518947. S2CID 144724121. Available online first on 15 April 2014.
- Haywood, C.; Mac an Ghaill, M. and Allan, J. A. (2015) Special Section: A War on Boys? Boyhood Studies: An Interdisciplinary Journal. 8(1):15-83.
- Haywood, C.; Mac an Ghaill, M. and Allan, J. A. (2015) Schools, Masculinity and bones in the War Against Boys. Boyhood Studies: An Interdisciplinary Journal. 8(1):15-21.
- Mac an Ghaill, Mairtin; Lowe, John (June 2015). 'The Postcolonial Ambiguities of Eurasian pan-ethnicity in Singapore', Asian and Pacific Migration Journal 24 (2): 232–45. SAGE doi:10.1177/0117196815579955
- Mac an Ghaill, Mairtin; Lowe, John; Haywood, Chris (2016). 'The cultural (re)production of masculinities: Chinese ethnicity, class and elite schooling in Indonesia', Asian Journal of Social Science 44 Brill Publishers: Forthcoming.
- Lowe, J.; Lin, X. and M. Mac an Ghaill (2016) Student-Parent attitudes towards Filipino migrant teachers in Indonesia. Asian and Pacific Migration Journal, vol 25, no. 2. doi:10.1177/0117196816654096
- Harris, P.; Haywood, C. and Mac an Ghaill, M. (2017) Higher education, de-centred subjectivities and the emergence of a pedagogical self among Black and Muslim students. Race Ethnicity and Education. 20(3):358-371.
- Lin, X. & M. Mac an Ghaill (2017) Shifting discourses from boy preference to boy crisis: educating boys and nation building in neoliberal China, Discourse: Studies in the Cultural Politics of Education, doi:10.1080/01596306.2017.1312284
- Mac an Ghaill, M. & Haywood, C. (2018) Performance and surveillance in an era of austerity: schooling the reflexive generation of Muslim young men, British Journal of Sociology of Education, 32, 2, 166–181.
- Mac an Ghaill, M. and Haywood, C. (2021). The British State's production of the Muslim School: A simultaneity of categories of difference analysis. British Educational Research Journal, 47, 2, 264–278.
- Stahl, G. and Mac an Ghaill, M. (2021) The pursuit of ‘the good life’: Muslim masculinities and the transition to higher education in Australia, International Journal of Inclusive Education, doi:10.1080/13603116.2021.1971310
- Mac an Ghaill, M. & Haywood, C. (2021) Ethnography, methodological autonomy and self-representational space - a reflexive millennial generation of Muslim young men, Ethnography and Education, 16, 4, 457–474.
- Mac an Ghaill M, Haywood C. State containment and closure of gendered possibilities among a millennial generation: On not knowing Muslim young men. The Sociological Review. February 2022. doi:10.1177/00380261221076192

=== Papers ===
- Mac an Ghaill, Máirtín; Hanafin, Joan; Conway, Paul (2004). Gender politics and exploring masculinities in Irish education. Dublin: NCCA. Pdf.
- Mac an Ghaill, Máirtín; Haywood, Chris (2007). A man of the world: emerging representations of global genders (PDF). Keele University. Conference, 2002.

== See also ==
- Men's studies
