= Hugh Raffles =

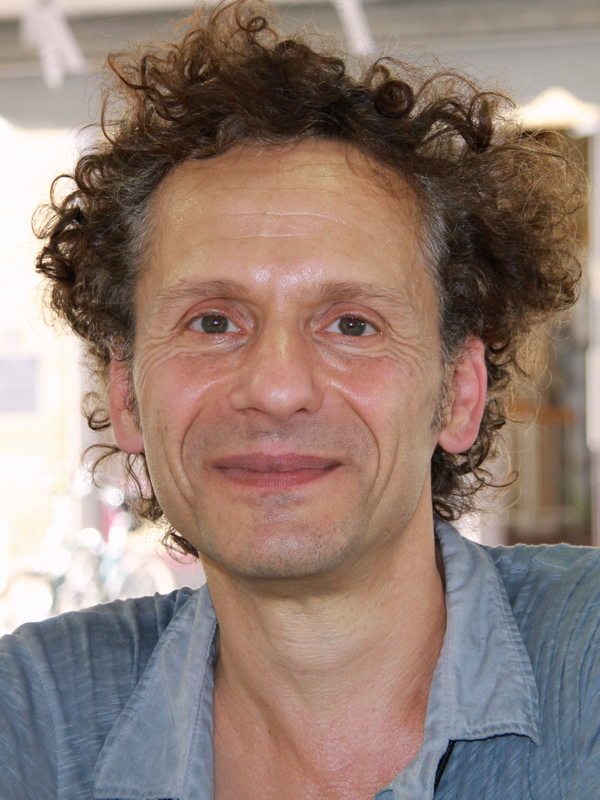
Hugh Raffles at the 2011 Texas Book Fair.

Hugh Raffles is an anthropologist and writer based in New York. He received an American Academy of Arts and Letters Award in Literature in 2023. He is the author of three books as well as many essays in venues including Granta, Public Culture, Natural History, Orion, American Ethnologist, The New York Times, The New York Review of Books, and The Best American Essays. He is Professor of Anthropology at The New School in New York.

== Life ==
Raffles grew up in London, England, and moved to New York in the early 1990s. He lives in New York City.

== Awards and criticism ==
Raffles was the recipient of the 2003 Victor Turner Prize for Ethnographic Writing of the Society for Humanistic Anthropology and of a Choice Outstanding Academic Title Award for In Amazonia: A Natural History.

In 2009, Raffles was awarded a Whiting Award. In 2010, Insectopedia was the winner of the 2011 Orion Book Award and received a Special Award from the Society for Humanistic Anthropology. In 2012, the book won the Ludwik Fleck Prize of the Society for Social Studies of Science and was shortlisted for the De Groene Waterman Prijs, Antwerp. The book was selected by The New York Times as a Notable Book of 2010. The Book of Unconformities was awarded the 2023 J.I. Staley Prize from the School for Advanced Research.

In 2023, Raffles received a Literature Award from the American Academy of Arts and Letters.

Writing in the New York Times Book Review, Philip Hoare described Insectopedia as "impossible to categorize, wildly allusive and always stimulating."

== Selected writing ==
=== Articles ===
- "Mother Nature's Melting Pot", The New York Times, Op-Ed, April 2, 2011.
- "Sweet Honey on the Block", The New York Times, Op-Ed, July 7, 2010.
- "A Conjoined Fate", Orion (2010).
- "Cricket Fighting", Granta 98: The Deep End (Summer 2007). Reprinted in Adam Gopnik ed., The Best American Essays (2008).
- "Jews, Lice, and History," Public Culture (2007).
- "Intimate Knowledge", International Social Science Journal (2002), reprinted in Nico Stehr; Reiner Grundmann, eds. (2005). Knowledge and Society: Forms of Knowledge. Taylor & Francis.

=== Books ===
- In Amazonia: A Natural History, 2002, Princeton University Press, ISBN 978-0-691-04885-7.
- Insectopedia, 2011, Pantheon Books, ISBN 1-4000-9696-0.
- Insect Theatre, 2013, Black Dog Books, photographs by Tim Edgar, ISBN 978-1908966117.
- The Book of Unconformities: Speculations on Lost Time, 2020, Pantheon Books, ISBN 978-0804197991.
