= Polity (publisher) =

Publisher based in the United Kingdom

- Status: Active
- Founded: 1984; 42 years ago
- Founder: Anthony Giddens; David Held; John Thompson
- Country of origin: United Kingdom
- Headquarters location: Cambridge
- Distribution: John Wiley and Sons
- Publication types: Books
- Official website: politybooks.com

Polity is an academic publisher in the social sciences and humanities.

It was established in 1984 in Cambridge by Anthony Giddens, David Held and John Thompson at the University of Cambridge. Giddens later reported: "We didn't have any publishing experience or money". Polity remains a private limited company, with the sociologist John Thompson at Jesus College, Cambridge listed as director. Giddens resigned as director in 2008, and Held died in 2019. Assets were audited at more than £4m in 2022. The company now has offices in Cambridge and Oxford in the United Kingdom, and New York City and Boston in the United States.

The company specializes in the areas of sociology, politics, philosophy, history, media, political economy and related fields, aiming to publish textbooks and course books for students and scholars as well as academic texts in these fields. Polity also publishes trade books for a general readership. Its books are distributed worldwide by Wiley.
