= Nightwork: Sexuality, Pleasure, and Corporate Masculinity in a Tokyo Hostess Club =

1994 book by Anne Allison

- Author: Anne Allison
- Publisher: University of Chicago Press
- Publication date: May 28, 1994
- Pages: 213
- ISBN: 9780226014876

Nightwork: Sexuality, Pleasure, and Corporate Masculinity in a Tokyo Hostess Club (1994) is a book-length study in the field of cultural anthropology of Japan by Anne Allison. This participant-observation ethnography describes the culture surrounding Japanese hostess clubs, which feature female servers specifically intended to flirt with or present a sexually attractive image to their typically white-collar sarariiman (salaryman) clients. Allison's work presents a perspective on corporate life and gender roles in Japan infrequently considered in academia and in Western culture.

== Content ==
The purpose of such clubs is described by the author as "getting men to relax, feel good about themselves as 'men,' and be sexually titillated by attractive, flattering women." They are frequented by groups of males from Japanese companies seeking to relax in the evening hours after work. Such outings are often viewed as mandatory in the work environment. Specialized areas of Tokyo and other large cities have developed which feature these establishments. Prices are often high and, as in many commercial fields, a wide range exists between low-prestige and high-prestige clubs, based on price and exclusiveness, often defined by the level of education of the serving women. Such clubs are part of the Japanese nightlife industry called the mizu shoubai, which also includes prostitution. (Genital sexual activities at hostess clubs, however, is strictly prohibited.) As one interview states, Nightwork counters the concept many Westerners have about Japan as "a well-ordered family-oriented society with no ostensible 'underworld.'"

The work also tells of gender roles in Japan and features of the contemporary Japanese family. Working men, due to their obligation to engage in socializing, are often absent from the home. The Japanese government in the 1980s granted after-work entertainment such as hostess clubs tax-deductible expense status as a result of the idea that its integrality to corporate culture would help Japan's economic success. Men were at home typically only on the weekends, a well-documented phenomenon, leading to the colloquial term for fathers and husbands in contemporary Japanese society, "our Sunday friend".

== Research ==
Anne Allison, currently professor of cultural anthropology at Duke University in the United States, wrote Nightwork through participant-observation ethnography. Allison, who received her Ph.D. in anthropology in 1986 from the University of Chicago, worked for four months as a hostess at a club in Roppongi as part of her ethnographic research. She observed and interviewed hostesses and other club workers as well as wives of the men who frequented such clubs and others. The unique perspective developed in the work derives from the fact that the clubs are viewed through the eyes of a woman and feminist anthropologist, who actually worked in the environment on a daily basis. Some critics have suggested, however, that Allison insufficiently addressed the degree to which her identity as a Caucasian Westerner may have influenced the interactions she took part in and observed in the hostess club.

The book was published in 1994, while the fieldwork was done in the mid-1980s. Some social changes occurred with the collapse of the Japanese bubble economy in the early 1990s. As a result, some believe that the book was out of date even when first published.
