= Leo Chavez =

American anthropologist

- Born: New Mexico, U.S.
- Known for: The Latino Threat, Shadowed Lives and Covering Immigration

Academic background
- Education: University of California, Santa Cruz, Stanford University

Academic work
- Discipline: Anthropology, immigration, Latin America
- Institutions: University of California, Irvine

Leo Ralph Chavez is an American anthropologist, author, and professor, best known for his work in international migration, particularly among Latin American immigrants.

== Background ==
Chavez was born in New Mexico. He received his bachelor's degree in anthropology at the University of California, Santa Cruz in 1974 and his PhD in the same at Stanford University in 1982. He now teaches at the University of California, Irvine.

== Books ==
=== Shadowed Lives ===
His book, Shadowed Lives: Undocumented Immigrants in American Society (Wadsworth Publishing, 1998), which provides an ethnographic account of Mexican and Central American illegal immigrants in San Diego County, California, is widely used in cultural anthropology courses throughout the United States.

=== Covering Immigration ===
His book Covering Immigration: Popular Images and the Politics of the Nation (UC Press, 2001) examines media representations of immigrations and the nation. This provocative book gives a cultural history of the immigration issue in the United States since 1965, using popular magazine covers as a fascinating entry into a discussion of our attitudes toward one of the most volatile debates in the nation. Leo Chavez gathers and analyzes over seventy cover images from politically diverse magazines, including Time, Newsweek, U.S. News & World Report, Business Week, The New Republic, The Nation, and American Heritage. He traces the connections between the social, legal, and economic conditions surrounding immigration and the diverse images through which it is portrayed. Covering Immigration suggests that media images not only reflect the national mood but also play a powerful role in shaping national discourse. Drawing on insights from anthropology, sociology, and cultural studies, this original and perceptive book raises new questions about the media's influence over the public's increasing fear of immigration.

=== The Latino Threat ===
His recent book The Latino Threat: Constructing Immigrants, Citizens, and the Nation (Stanford University Press, 2008) examines the role of media spectacles in helping shape how Latinos are constructed as a threat to the nation and for undermining claims of citizenship. Specific sites of contestation over citizenship and belonging are also examined, such as organ transplants for immigrants, the Minuteman Project's spectacle of surveillance along the Arizona-Mexico border, and the marches for immigrant rights of 2006.

== Academia ==
Chavez is currently a Professor of Anthropology at University of California, Irvine, where he teaches undergraduate and graduate courses on immigration, international migration, culture and visual images, and medical anthropology.

Chavez's research interests include international migration; household and family organization, composition, and structure; medical anthropology; breast and cervical cancer among Latinas; the anthropology of power relations; and, more recently, the analysis of visual images related to immigration and the nation.
