= Margaret Mead Award =

Anthropology award

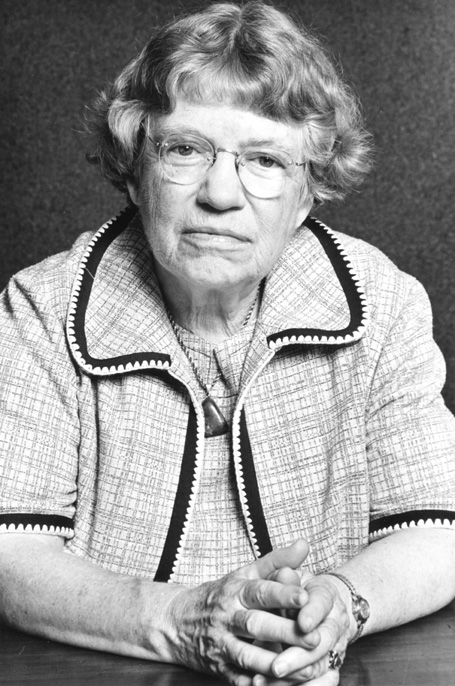
Margaret Mead, 1977

Margaret Mead Award is an award in the field of anthropology presented (solely) by the Society for Applied Anthropology from 1979 to 1983 and jointly with the American Anthropological Association afterwards. This award was named after anthropologist Margaret Mead, who had a particular talent for bringing anthropology fully into the light of public attention. It is awarded annually but once became every-other-year from 1991 to 1999.

The Margaret Mead Award is presented to a younger scholar for a particular accomplishment such as a book, film, monograph, or service, which interprets anthropological data and principles in ways that make them meaningful and accessible to a broadly concerned public. The award is designed to recognize a person clearly associated with research and/or practice in anthropology. The awardee's activity will exemplify skills in broadening the impact of anthropology, the skills for which Margaret Mead was admired widely.

== Recipients ==
The recipients of the award are as follows.

1979 - John Ogbu

1980 - Brigitte Jordan

1981 - Nancy Scheper-Hughes

1982 - Mary Linsday Elmendorf

1983 - Ruthann Knudson

1984 - Sue E. Estroff

1985 - Susan C.M. Scrimshaw

1986 - Jill Korbin

1987 - Myra Bluebond-Langner

1988 - Alex Stepick III

1989 - Mark Nichter

1990 - Wenda Trevathan

1991 - Will Roscoe

1993 - Leo R. Chavez

1995 - Katherine Ann Dettwyler

1997 - Philippe Bourgois

1999 - Paul Farmer

2000 - Kathryn M. Dudley

2001 - Mimi Nichter

2002 - Tobias Hecht

2003 - Marc Sommers

2004 - Donna Goldstein

2005 - Luke Eric Lassiter

2007 - João Biehl

2008- Daniel Jordan Smith

2009 - Sverker Finnström

2010 - Jessaca Leinaweaver

2011 - Frances Norwood

2012 - Erin Finley

2013 - Sera Young

2014 - Seth M. Holmes

2015 - Mark Schuller

2016 - Jason De Leon

2017 - Sameena Mulla

2018 - Jennifer Mack

2019 - Claudio Sopranzetti

2020 - Narges Bajoghli and Ashanté M. Reese (co-winners)

2021- Amber R. Reed

2022- Michael Crawley

2023- Darren Byler

2024- Joeva Sean Rock

2025- Amelia Fiske

== See also ==
- List of anthropology awards
