= Serge Latouche =

French economist and philosopher (born 1940)

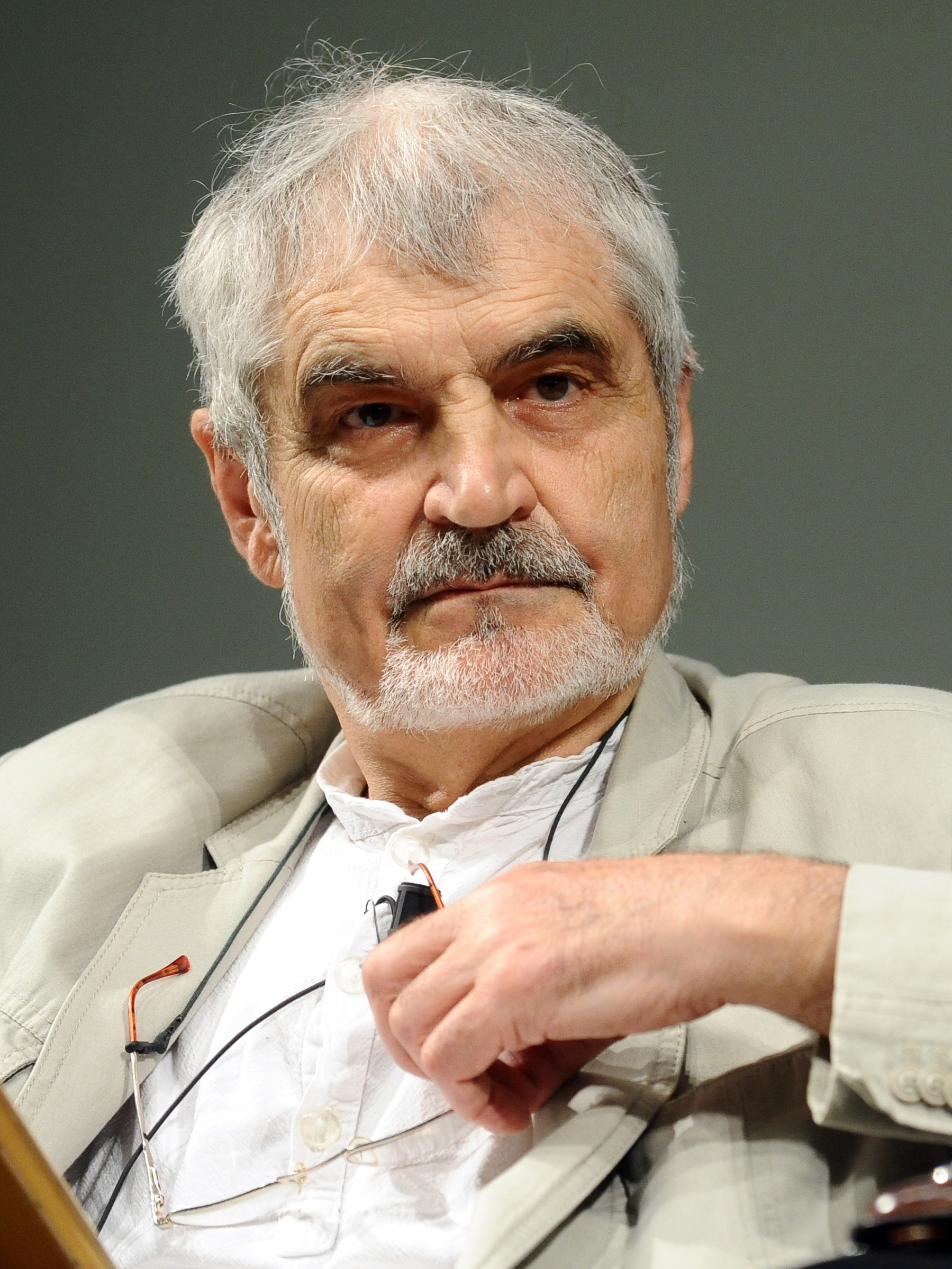
- Latouche in 2012
- Born: 12 January 1940 (age 86); Vannes, Morbihan, France

Philosophical work
- Era: 20th-/21st-century philosophy
- Region: Western philosophy
- School: Continental philosophy Degrowth theory
- Institutions: Paris XI
- Main interests: Postdevelopment theory
- Notable ideas: Degrowth, frugal abundance

Serge Latouche (/ləˈtuːʃ/; French: [latuʃ]; born 12 January 1940) is a French emeritus professor of economics at the University of Paris-Sud. He holds a degree in political sciences, philosophy and economy.

== Work ==
Latouche is a specialist in north–south economic and cultural relations, and in the epistemology of the social sciences. He has developed a critical theory towards economic orthodoxy. He denounces economism, utilitarianism in social sciences, consumer society and the notion of sustainable development. He particularly criticizes the notions of economic efficiency and economic rationalism. He is one of the thinkers and most renowned partisans of the degrowth theory. Latouche has also published in the Revue du Mauss, a French anti-utilitarian journal.

== Publications ==
=== Books ===
- Faut-il refuser le développement?: Essai sur l'anti-économique du Tiers-monde (Presses universitaires de France, 1986)
- La planète des naufragés: Essai sur l'après-développement (La Découverte, 1991)
- In the Wake of the Affluent Society: An Exploration of Post-Development (Zed Books, London, 1993).
- The Westernization of the World: Significance, Scope and Limits of the Drive Towards Global Uniformity (Polity Press, Cambridge, United Kingdom, 1996).
- L'Autre Afrique: Entre don et marché (Albin Michel, 1998).
- La Déraison de la raison économique: de l'efficacité au principe de précaution (Albin Michel, 2001).
- Justice sans limites: Le défi de l'éthique dans une économie mondialisée (Fayard, 2003).
- Décoloniser l'imaginaire : La Pensée créative contre l'économie de l'absurde (Parangon, 2003).
- Survivre au développement : De la décolonisation de l'imaginaire économique à la construction d'une société alternative (Mille et Une Nuits, 2004).
- La Mégamachine : Raison technoscientifique, raison économique et mythe du progrès, (2004).
- L'invention de l'économie, (2005).
- Le pari de la décroissance, (2006).
- Petit traité de la décroissance sereine, (Mille et Une Nuits, 2007). English translation: Latouche, S. (2010). Farewell to Growth (David Macey, Trans.). Polity Press.
- Sortir de la sociedad de consumo, (Les Liens qui Libèrent, 2010). Spanish translation: Latouche, S. (2012). Salir de la sociedad de consumo: Voces y vías del decrecimiento (First Spanish edition). Ocataedro.
- Vers une société d'abondance frugale, (Mille et Une Nuits, 2011). Spanish translation: Latouche, S. (2012). La sociedad de la abundancia frugal: Contrasentidos y controversias del decrecimiento. Icaria.

=== Contributions to other books ===
- De-growth, Inequality and Poverty in Paolo Ventura, Enrique Calderon, Michela Tiboni, "Sustainable development Policies for Minor Deprived Urban Communities", Milano, McGraw-Hill, 2011. pages 71–79 ISBN 978-88-386-7282-8.
- "Paradoxical Growth", Chapter 12 in The Post-Development Reader, ed. by Majid Rahnema & Victoria Bawtree (Zed Books, London, 1997).

=== Articles ===
- "Would the West actually be happier with less? The World Downscaled", Le Monde diplomatique (December 2003).
- "Why Less Should Be So Much More: Degrowth Economics", Le Monde diplomatique (December 2004).
- "Can democracy solve all problems?", The International Journal of Inclusive Democracy, Vol.1, No. 3 (May 2005).
- "A bas le développement durable ! Vive la decroissance conviviale !", Institut d'études économiques et sociales pour la décroissance soutenable (Institute for Economic and Social Studies for Sustainable Degrowth) (Paris, January 2006).
- "How do we learn to want less? The globe downshifted", Le Monde diplomatique (January 2006).
- "De-growth: an electoral stake?" The International Journal of Inclusive Democracy Vol. 3, No. 1 (January 2007).
