= Harvie Ferguson =

British sociologist

- Citizenship: British
- Education: University of Edinburgh; University of Cambridge; University of Glasgow
- Scientific career
- Fields: Sociology
- Workplaces: University of Leicester; University of Glasgow

Harvie Ferguson was Professor of Sociology at the University of Glasgow until his retirement in 2011. He has written extensively on the development of cultural, philosophical, and psychological aspects of the development of western modernity.

He has published research on war experience in both a modern European and Japanese perspective. His most recent book in English is Self-Identity and Everyday Life (2009)

== Selected works ==
- Ferguson, H. (2010), La pasión agotada. Estilos de la vida contemporánea. Buenos Aires/Madrid, Katz editores, ISBN 9788492946235
- Ferguson, H. (2006), Phenomenological Sociology. Insight and Experience in Modern Society. London, Sage. ISBN 0761959874
- Ferguson, H. (2000), Modernity and Subjectivity. Body, Soul, Spirit. Charlottesville, University of Virginia Press
- Ferguson, H. (1996), The Lure of Dreams. Sigmund Freud and the Construction of Modernity. London, Routledge
- Ferguson, H. (1994), Melancholy and the Critique of Modernity. Søren Kierkegaard's Religious Psychology. London, Routledge
- Ferguson, H. (1992), Religious Transformation in Western Society. The End of Happiness. London, Routledge
- Ferguson, H. (1990), The Science of Pleasure. Cosmos and Psyche in the Bourgeois World View. London, Routledge
