= John Thompson (sociologist) =

British sociologist (born 1951)

John Brookshire Thompson FAcSS is a British sociologist. He is a sociology professor at the University of Cambridge and a fellow of Jesus College.

== Education ==
Thompson gained his first degree in philosophy, sociology and social anthropology at Keele University in 1975. His PhD was from the University of Cambridge, obtained in 1979.

== Work ==
Thompson has studied the influence of the media in the formation of modern societies, a subject on which he is one of the few social theorists to focus. One of the key themes of his work is the role of the media in the transformation of space and time in social life, and the creation of new forms of action and interaction beyond temporal and spatial frameworks. Influenced strongly by hermeneutics, he studies communication and its uses, and links it closely with social context. Other key concepts are the transformation of visibility, the media and tradition, and identity and the symbolic project.

His book Ideology and Modern Culture is a study of what the theory of ideology entails in modern society. William Outhwaite of the University of Sussex dubs it "a pathbreaking work which will undoubtedly become one of the fundamental texts in the theory of ideology." Thompson's essay "The New Visibility" is employed as the basis for the study of media at Rhodes University, while his tome Political Scandal: Power and Visibility in the Media Age has been described by Amy Binder of Clemson University as "excellent". His work stands out for its recognition of the importance of the nature and development of mass communication.

=== Questioning 'mass communication' and its meaning ===
In Thompson's The Media and Modernity, he breaks down the term mass communication and questions whether it is applicable to today's current media environment. He firstly highlights the use of the word 'mass' and claims that most of the media today are not produced for the masses, rather they are produced for niche markets. "The term 'mass' is especially misleading. It conjures up the image of a vast audience comprising many thousands, even millions of individuals. This may be an accurate image in the case of some media products, such as the most popular modern-day newspapers, films and television programmes; but it is hardly an accurate representation of the circumstance of most media products, past or present."(Thompson, 1995, p13) He also criticises use of the word 'mass' in how it categorises audiences into "undifferentiated individuals"(Thompson, 1995, p13).

Thompson then proceeds to talk about the use of the word 'communication' and how mass communication is often "overwhelmingly one-way."(Thompson, 1995, p14) He contrasts this with face to face communication and the two-way process that takes place when people talk to each other. Thompson is of the belief that in the age of digital technology there are more suitable terms that can be used including "'mediated communication' or more simply, 'the media' which are less laden with misleading assumptions."(Thompson, 1995, p15)

Thompson, in The Media and Modernity offers five key characteristics to explain the term mass communication. Thompson's first characteristic is the technical and institutional means of production and diffusion, meaning that the "development of mass communication is inseparable from the development of the media industries". Secondly, Thompson highlights what he labels commodification of symbolic forms which can be subjected into two forms of valorisation; information having economic value and information having symbolic value. Thirdly, Thompson proposes that mass communication institutes a structured break between the production of symbolic forms and their reception, meaning that the content is not produced at the same place and time as when the audience receives it. Thompson further goes on to highlight some implications with this characteristic, suggesting that due to this structured break media producers are deprived of the viewers reactions which alters the feedback they are given.

Furthermore, media producers are unable to obtain the audiences interpretation of their message thus making the audience and the producers unequal partners in the process of symbolic exchange. Thompson suggests that although symbols are not inherently ideological they can be readily used as a way of subtly promoting or maintaining ideologies. The fourth characteristic highlighted by Thompson is that mass communication extends the availability of symbolic forms in space and time, this examines the different contexts in which the message is produced and received. Which leads into Thompson's fifth characteristic of mass communication, which involves the public circulation of symbolic forms, this characteristic examines the availability and access of media forms to a plurality of media recipients and the blurring of the private and public domains.

=== Critical hermeneutics ===
Thompson's theoretical approach "seeks to sketch the contours of a critical and rationally justified theory for the interpretation of action". He called his approach to sociological theory "critical hermeneutics."

=== Publishing industry ===
Thompson's recent work focuses particularly on the publishing industry. Books in the Digital Age: The Transformation of Academic and Higher Education Publishing in Britain and the United States (Polity, 2005) presents an analysis of higher education publishing from 1980 to 2005. Much of the analysis is based on industry interviews made on condition of anonymity. His Merchants of Culture (Polity, 2009) is more extensive covering the entire publishing and bookselling industry from the 1960s to the present. In an interview he suggests that the challenge presented to the traditional physical book by ebooks is overstated. Thompson is a Director of Polity Press.
