= 2000s in video games =

Video game-related events in 2000s

- 1990s
- 2000s in video games
- 2010s
Other topics in 2000s:
- Anthropology
- Comics
- Fashion
- Motorsport
- Music
- Science and technology
- Sociology
- Television

The 2000s was the fourth decade in the industry's history. It was a decade that was primarily dominated by Sony, Nintendo, newcomer Microsoft, and their respective systems. Sega, being Nintendo's main rival in the 1980s and 1990s, left the console market in 2001 in favor of returning to third-party development, as they once were. Overall the decade saw the last of the low resolution three-dimensional polygons of the 1990s with the emergence of high definition games, and often focused on developing immersive and interactive environments, implementing realistic physics, and improving artificial intelligence. The sixth and seventh generation of video game consoles went on sale, including the PlayStation 2, Xbox, GameCube, Xbox 360, PlayStation 3, Wii, Game Boy Advance, Nintendo DS and PlayStation Portable. Notable games released in the 2000s included Grand Theft Auto III, Grand Theft Auto: Vice City, Grand Theft Auto: San Andreas, Halo: Combat Evolved, Halo 2, Wii Sports, Half-Life 2, The Elder Scrolls IV: Oblivion, BioShock, World of Warcraft, The Sims, Super Smash Bros. Melee, Resident Evil 4, The Legend of Zelda: The Wind Waker, The Legend of Zelda: Twilight Princess, Metal Gear Solid 2: Sons of Liberty, Metal Gear Solid 3: Snake Eater, Call of Duty 4: Modern Warfare, Portal, Shadow of the Colossus, Gears of War, God of War, Super Mario Galaxy, Uncharted 2: Among Thieves, and League of Legends.

== Consoles of the 2000s ==
=== Sixth generation (1998–2006) ===
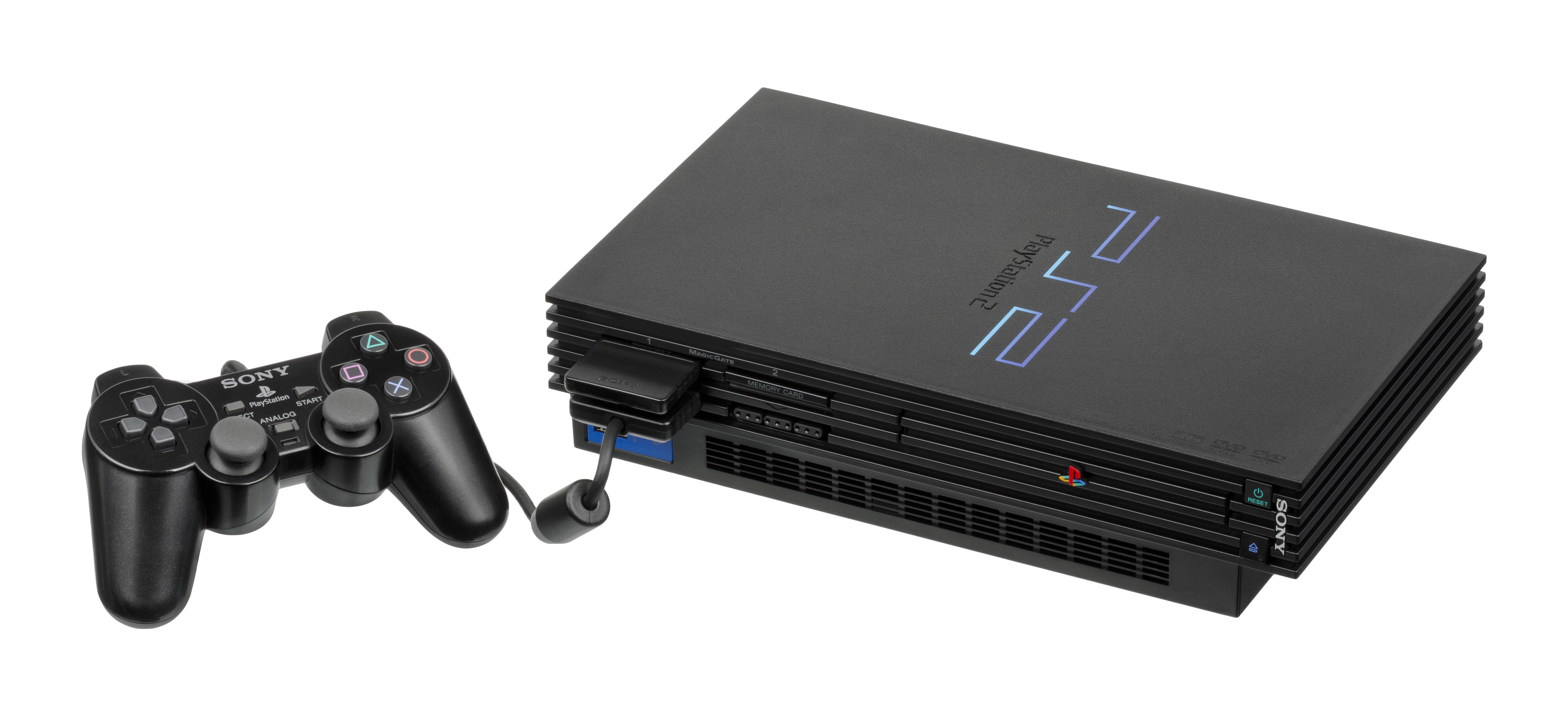
PlayStation 2 (2000)

The sixth generation of video games officially began in 1998 with the introduction of the short-lived Dreamcast, which was discontinued in 2001. Sega announced that they would no longer produce video game consoles after two straight underperforming consoles and became a third-party developer. The PlayStation 2 was released in 2000 and became the best-selling video game console of all time. Microsoft entered the home console market with the Xbox. Although initially expected to struggle, it managed to reach second place in sales behind the PS2 on the strength of the launch title Halo: Combat Evolved. The GameCube, launched in 2001 alongside the Xbox, fell into third place, a first for Nintendo.

The sixth generation improved on the 3D graphics of the fifth generation consoles. Some of the new features in the consoles included built-in DVD players and hard drives. Internet play on consoles, pioneered by the Dreamcast, became commercially viable with the Xbox Live system, which was launched in November 2002, one year after the console's release. It featured a broadband connection and downloadable content and was a success.

=== Seventh generation (2005–2012) ===
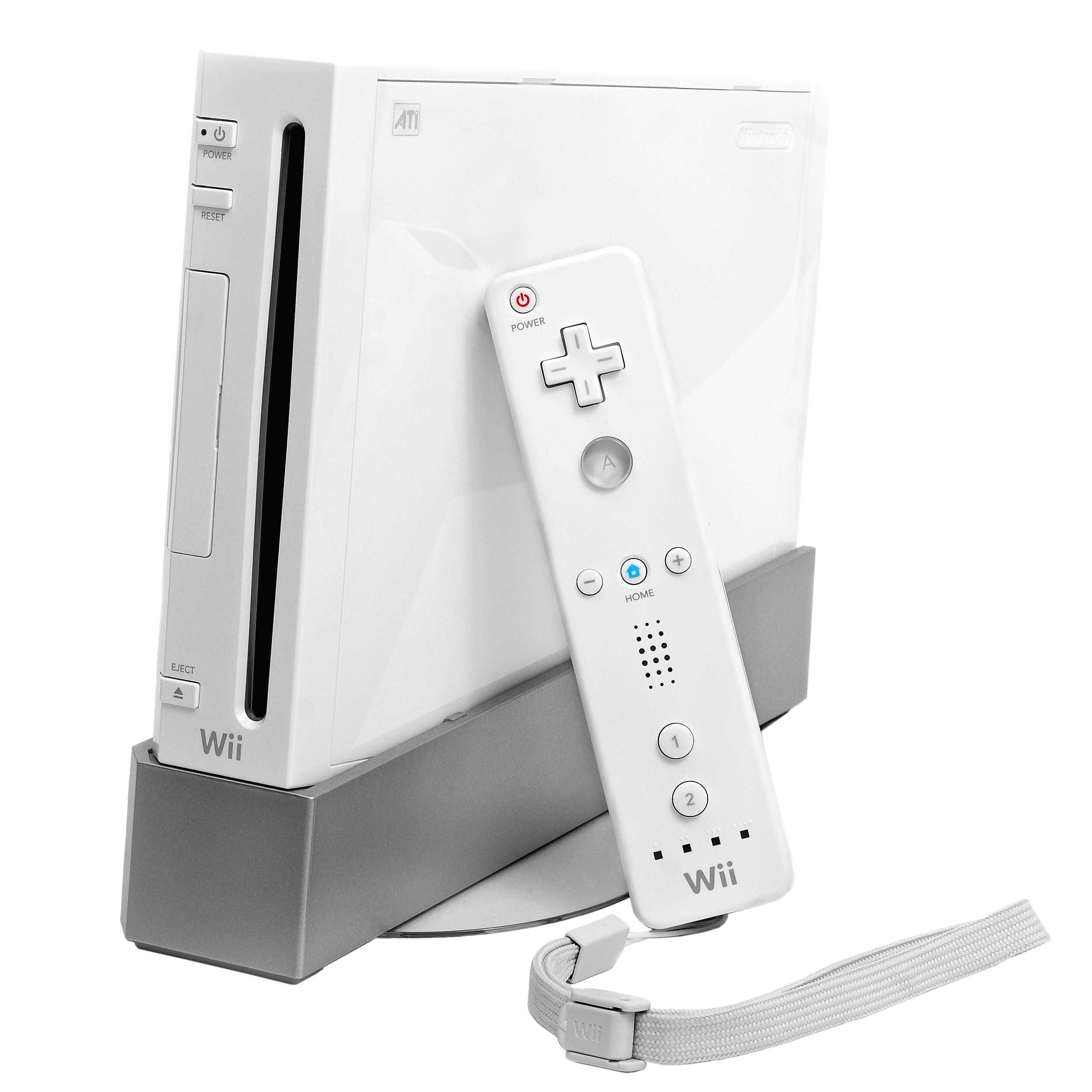
Nintendo Wii (2006)

The seventh generation of consoles began with the release of the Xbox 360 in 2005. This was followed by the Wii and the PlayStation 3 in 2006. The seventh-generation featured widespread implementation of HD-ready graphics, media centers, and Wireless game controllers, as well as online services for all consoles. The PS3 also has Blu-ray Disc compatibility. The Wii implemented an innovative game controller that features full motion sensitivity and is wielded like a remote, with limited button interaction. In response, the PS3 introduced tilt-sensitive functionality with its controllers. The Wii's motion sensitive controls and focus on family-friendly games, while alienating some hardcore gamers, helped the Wii to become the best-selling console of the seventh-generation. The high price of the PS3 had initially caused slow sales, but numerous price cuts and efforts to bring feature-parity between it and Xbox 360 were made in the years following. It was generally successful as the PlayStation 3 steadily increased in popularity, resulting in lifetime sales to be nearly equal to that of the Xbox 360.

Nintendo continued to dominate the handheld console market with the release of the dual-screen Nintendo DS in 2004. One of the screens is a touchscreen. The PlayStation Portable, released in 2005 by Sony, was the first serious competitor to Nintendo's handheld video game consoles and is by far the best-selling non-Nintendo handheld.

== History ==
=== An evolving industry ===
Early on in the decade, the video games world was shaken up over two major stories that dominated the headlines: Sega was pulling out of the console war and that Microsoft was entering the market. Sega stated that the poor performance of the Sega Dreamcast and Sega Saturn lines contributed to their decision. The company returned to third party publishing for the remaining consoles. Microsoft officially debuted their Xbox console at the Game Developers Conference in 2000 after much speculation.

After the release of the Xbox and PlayStation 2, a noticeable trend was to push video game consoles into media centers and offer more features than just playing games. Nintendo was slow to react and released the GameCube in 2001 without many of the exotic features seen in other consoles. Instead, Nintendo was focusing on improving the gameplay experience, as well as preparing its new innovative controller to be released in 2006. Backward compatibility also became a staple feature to gaming in this decade. The PlayStation 2 was the first major system to allow for backward compatibility to a preceding console.

Copyright infringement became a big concern to game developers and many companies tried experimenting with ways to combat the growing problem, especially among PC games. Some companies required registration through the use of a product key. In one of the more notable events of the decade, Valve was hit particularly hard by a hacker and subsequently had much of their work on Half-Life 2 leaked onto the internet.

Sony and Microsoft released their PlayStation 3 and Xbox 360 consoles in the mid-decade. As the decade progressed, more and more features were added to consoles. Internet connectivity became ubiquitous and some games integrated the use of webcam accessories. In the mid-decade, the industry was caught in the crossfire of the HD DVD and Blu-ray format war. Ultimately, the Blu-ray format won out, but that didn't help Microsoft after they have already made HD DVD compatibility a feature. Nintendo had still yet to release a system compatible for viewing films. Instead, Nintendo unveiled the Wii and revolutionized the industry with the interactive gameplay that its brand new controller provided. It would not be until the next decade that Sony or Microsoft would release a similar motion controller to the Wii as an accessory (See: Kinect and PlayStation Move).

=== Graphic innovation ===
The 1990s decade oversaw the transition from 2D-based video games to fully immersive three-dimensional environments and gameplay. The 2000s continued on this trend by polishing many of the flaws of creating a new dimension for games such as rigid polygon characters and animations. By the decades end, Microsoft and Sony had already been releasing games in high definition.

=== Status of PC video games ===
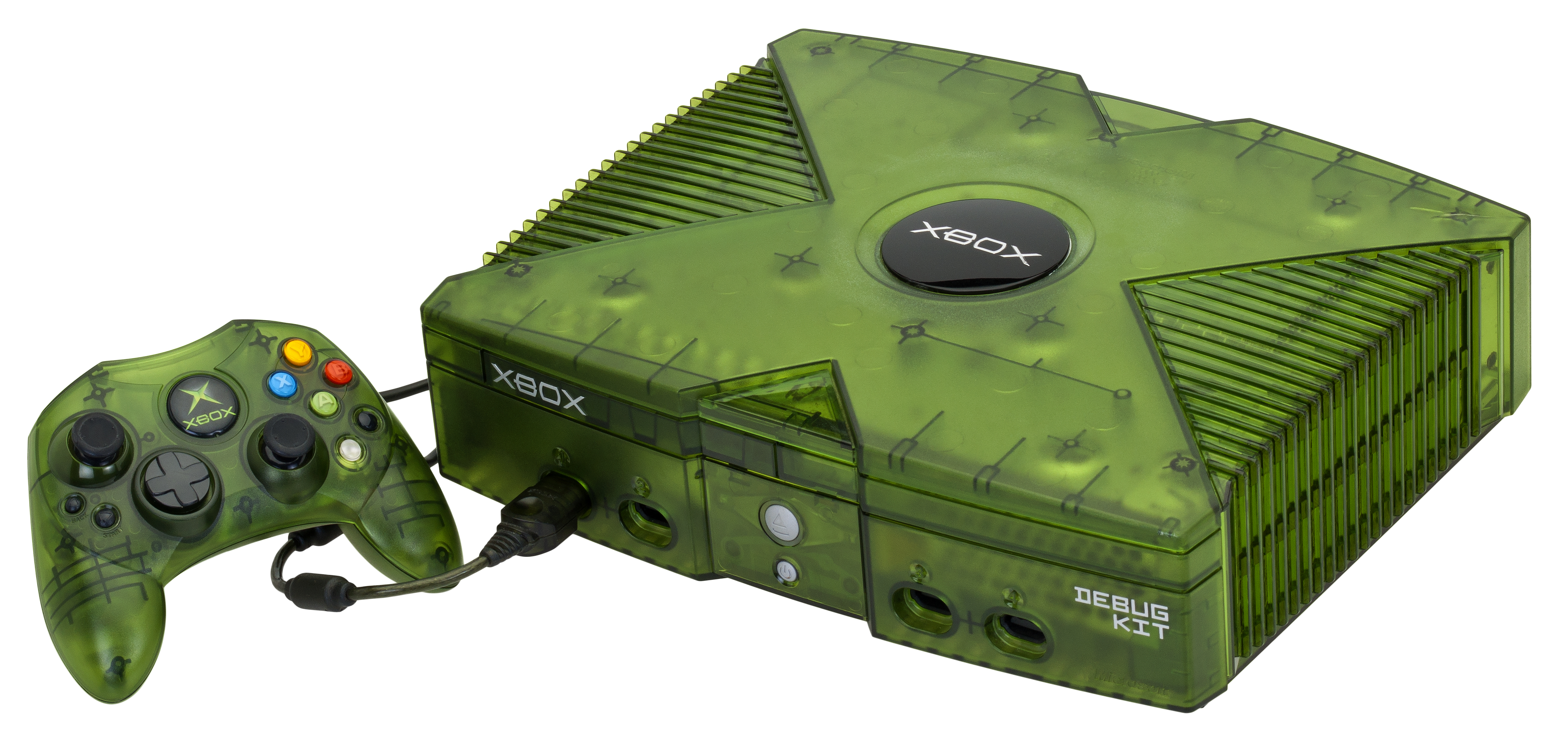
An Xbox Debug Kit, intended for game developers on porting PC games to the Xbox.

PC video games remained popular throughout the decade, but was in an overall decline as consoles became more and more popular. Publishers also liked the standardization that consoles provided, whereas PC game performance was dependent on the graphic capabilities of a player's hardware. Nevertheless, the PC remained the device of choice for many popular strategy, simulation, and online games.

Blizzard was a company in the spotlight on numerous occasions throughout the 2000s and loyal to the PC. In 2000, it released the hack and slash game Diablo II which is frequently listed as one of the best games ever made. The game continues to have a wide following many years after its release and was listed on NPD Group's top ten PC games sales list as recently as 2010. Then in 2004, Blizzard wowed gamers with the release of World of Warcraft, which was the world's most-subscribed MMORPG at the time with over 10 million subscribers.

The Sims, a spin-off project of the popular Sim City franchise, also became a popular game of the era. Combining all of its sequels and expansions, The Sims easily becomes one of the best-selling PC game in history. The Sims also had an important role in bringing female and casual gamers into the often male-dominated and hardcore video game market.

=== Rhythm game fad ===
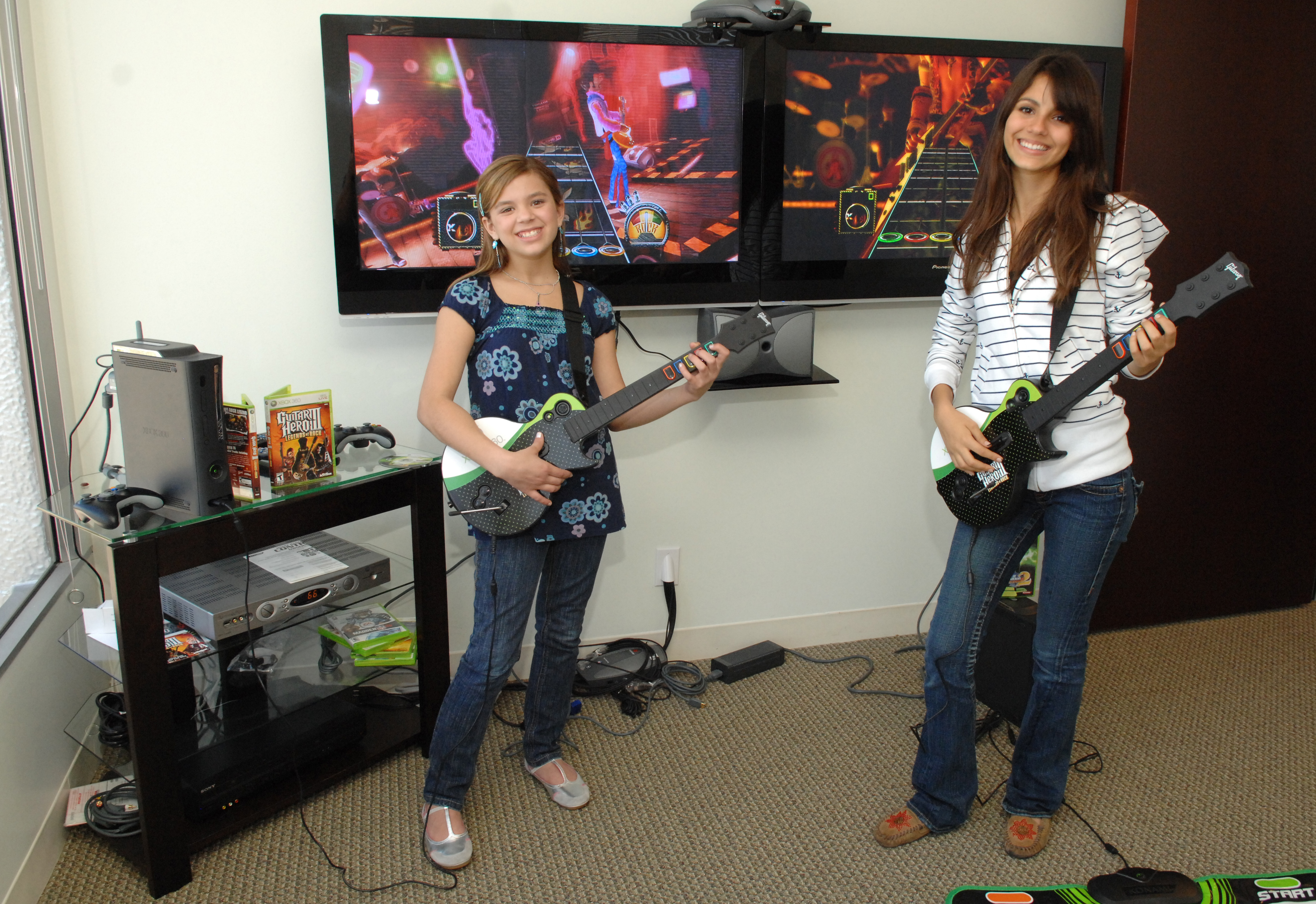
Aria Wallace and Victoria Justice playing Guitar Hero

Rhythm games were primarily centered in the arcade with popular games such as Dance Dance Revolution and Beatmania. Many of these franchises had been popular since the late-nineties, but it wasn't until Guitar Hero's release in 2005 that the genre really impacted on popular culture. Most games in this category will feature a set list of songs that a player can choose to perform. They also generally come with a unique controller, usually shaped like a musical instrument. The success of Guitar Hero lead to the creation of other similar game franchises such as Rock Band and DJ Hero. These games have also been cited as inspiration for people seeking to actually play instruments, and leading to a revival of interest in classic rock nostalgia.

In retrospect, rhythm games appear to have been a fad. In late 2011, due to low sale figures, Activision closed its Guitar Hero division.

=== Video games in Africa ===
Since 2007, the fast growing mobile market in African countries such as Nigeria and Kenya has resulted in a growth in mobile game development. Local developers have taken advantage of the recent increase in mobile internet connection in countries where broadband is rarely available and console games are expensive, though locally developed applications have difficulty competing against millions of western applications available on the Google Play Store. This growth has continued through the 2010s as video games are becoming a more viable business on the continent.

=== A decade of controversy ===
As video games approached greater realism in their graphic capabilities, it was inevitable that controversy would result. The evidence was inconclusive, but debates continued throughout the decade about the level of profanity, violence, pornography, and whether or not video games had an addictive effect. One game series in particular that was no stranger to controversy in the 2000s was Grand Theft Auto. In the 2004 San Andreas installment of the series, the game received widespread criticism revolving around the Hot Coffee mod, a normally disabled mini-game that could be enabled. The drama and pressure forced the ESRB to re-rate the game as an AO (Adults Only) and to have it pulled from store shelves. The game was also criticized for being excessively violent. Another game that struck a nerve with many analysts and the general public was a game released in 2005 entitled Super Columbine Massacre RPG! in which a player actually carries out the events of the 1999 Columbine high school shooting. The game and its creator, Danny Ledonne, was both praised for the bold statement on free speech and criticized for being distasteful. It became the first finalist to ever be rejected at the 2007 Slamdance Film Festival's Guerrilla Games Competition. In protest of the rejection, many of the finalists withdrew from the competition and in the end no awards were handed out that year. The competition has not been held since the 2007 incident.

=== Expanded influence ===
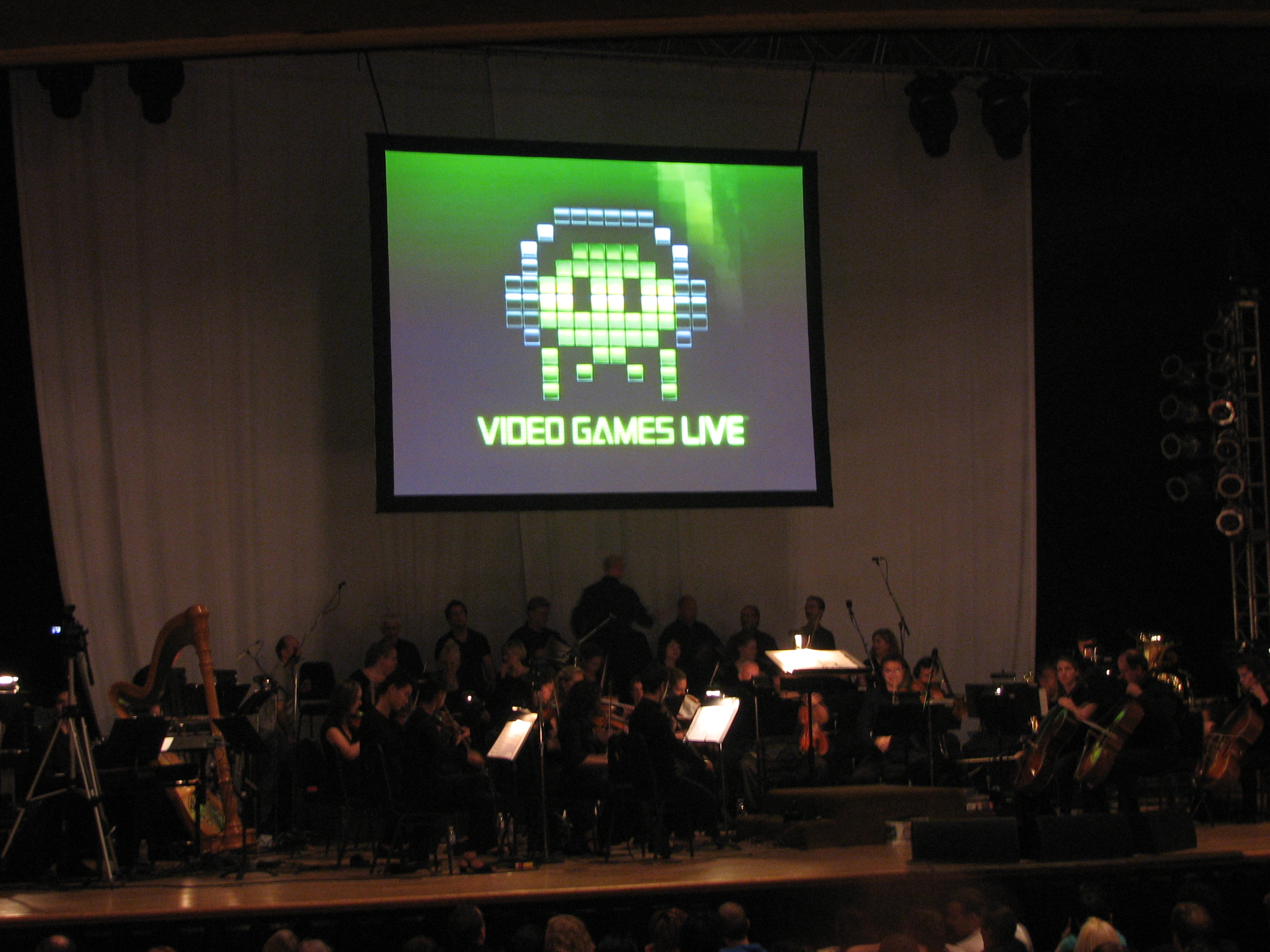
An orchestra performing a Video Games Live event

As video games diversified and became an ever-present part of pop culture, its influence began integrating with other media. The film industry in particular took notice and capitalized on how they could integrate video games into their storytelling. The Wachowskis, known for their Matrix series of films, developed Enter the Matrix to tie together the events of The Matrix Reloaded and The Matrix Revolutions motion pictures. Making films from video games is nothing new to Hollywood, but the transition from video game to film doesn't always succeed. The 2000s however began to show promise in the profitability and success of making video game-based films. Opening in 2001, Lara Croft: Tomb Raider became the highest-grossing video game adaptation with over a US$274 million box office performance. Tomb Raider held that title for nearly a decade. Other adaptations in the 2000s included the popular Resident Evil saga, Silent Hill, Max Payne, Hitman, Alone in the Dark, DOOM, House of the Dead, and Dungeon Siege.

The 2000s was also the first decade that the medium has significantly affected classical music. Tommy Tallarico and Jack Wall had a vision that a concert would be a way to show "how culturally significant video games and video game music is in the world today." The first Video Games Live concert was held at the Hollywood Bowl on July 6, 2005, to an audience of 11,000 people. Many of the events feature a live orchestra, synchronized lighting and effects, and gameplay projected onto a screen.

== Notable video-game franchises established in the 2000s ==
- Ace Attorney (2001)
- Akinator (2007)
- Angry Birds (2009) ^{1}
- Animal Crossing (2001)
- ARMA (2006)
- Army of Two (2008)
- Art Academy (2009)
- Assassin's Creed (2007)
- ATV Offroad Fury (2001)
- Batman: Arkham (2009)^{1}
- Battlefield (2002)
- Bayonetta (2009)
- Bejeweled (2001)
- Big Brain Academy (2005)
- BioShock (2007)
- Bit.Trip (2009)
- Black & White (2001)
- Bloons (2007)
- Borderlands (2009)
- Brothers in Arms (2005)
- Burnout (2001)
- Buzz! (2005) ^{2}
- Call of Duty (2003)
- Call of Juarez (2006)
- Chibi-Robo! (2005)
- Cities XL (2009)
- Club Penguin (2005)
- Company of Heroes (2006)
- Cooking Mama (2006) ^{2}
- Counter-Strike (2000)^{2}
- Crackdown (2007)
- Crysis (2007)
- De Blob (2008) ^{2}
- Dead Rising (2006)
- Dead Space (2008)
- Def Jam (2003)
- Deus Ex (2000)
- Devil May Cry (2001)
- Divinity (2002)
- Dinosaur King (2005)
- Doodle Jump (2009)
- Dragon Age (2009)
- Drawn to Life (2007)
- Dungeon Siege (2002)
- Empire Earth (2001)
- Etrian Odyssey (2007)
- EyeToy (2003)
- Fable (2004)
- Family Guy (2006) ^{1}
- Far Cry (2004)
- FarmVille (2009)
- F.E.A.R. (2005)
- FIFA Street (2005) ^{2}
- Fight Night (2004)
- Football Manager (2005)^{2}
- Forza Motorsport (2005)
- Gears of War (2006)
- Geometry Wars (2003)
- God of War (2005)
- Gothic (2001)
- Grid (2008)
- Guild Wars (2005)
- Guitar Hero (2005)
- Halo (2001)
- Hitman (2000)
- Inazuma Eleven (2008)
- Infamous (2009)
- Imagine (2007)
- Jak and Daxter (2001)
- Jet Set Radio (2000)
- Jubeat (2008)
- Just Cause (2006)
- Just Dance (2009) ^{2}
- Katamari Damacy (2004)
- Killzone (2004)
- Kingdom Hearts (2002)
- League of Legends (2009)
- Left 4 Dead (2008)
- LittleBigPlanet (2008)
- LocoRoco (2006)
- Lord of the Rings (2002)^{1}
- Lost Planet (2006)
- Luigi's Mansion (2001)^{2}
- Lumines (2004)
- Mafia (2002)
- Manhunt (2003)
- Mario vs. Donkey Kong (2004)^{2}
- Mario & Luigi (2003)^{2}
- Mario & Sonic at the Olympic Games (2007)^{2}
- Mass Effect (2007)
- Max Payne (2001)
- Messiah (2000)
- Minecraft (2009)
- Mirror's Edge (2008)
- MLB: The Show (2006)
- Monster Hunter (2004)
- Moshi Monsters (2008)
- MotorStorm (2006)
- MVP Baseball (2003)
- MX vs. ATV (2005)
- Naruto (2003) ^{1}
- NBA Street (2001) ^{2}
- NFL Street (2004) ^{2}
- Nintendogs (2005)
- Ōkami (2006)
- Operation Flashpoint (2001)
- Overlord (2007)
- Paper Mario (2000)^{2}
- Peggle (2007)
- Perfect Dark (2000)
- Pikmin (2001)
- Plants vs. Zombies (2009)
- Poptropica (2007)
- Portal (2007)^{2}
- Pro Yakyū Spirits (2004) ^{2}
- Professor Layton (2007) ^{2}
- Prototype (2009)
- Psychonauts (2005)
- Ratchet & Clank (2002)
- Raving Rabbids (2006) ^{1} ^{2}
- Red Dead (2004)
- Red Faction (2001)
- Resistance (2006)
- Rhythm Tengoku (2006) ^{2}
- Rise of Nations (2003)
- Risen (2009)
- Roblox (2006)
- Rock Band (2007)
- RuneScape (2001)
- Saints Row (2006)
- Scene It? Lights, Camera, Action (2007)
- Scribblenauts (2009)
- Shantae (2002)
- SingStar (2004) ^{2}
- Skate (2007)
- Sly Cooper (2002) ^{2}
- SOCOM (2002)
- Splosion Man (2009)
- SpongeBob SquarePants (2001)
- Spore (2008)
- SSX (2000)
- Star Wars: Battlefront (2004)
- Star Wars: Knights of the Old Republic (2003) ^{1} ^{2}
- Super Brawl (2009) ^{2}
- Super Monkey Ball (2001)
- Taiko no Tatsujin (2001)
- Tak and the Power of Juju (2003) ^{1}
- The Political Machine (2004)
- The Sims (2000)^{2}
- The Witcher (2007)
- TimeSplitters (2000)
- Tom Clancy's Ghost Recon (2001)
- Tom Clancy's Splinter Cell (2002)
- Tomodachi (2009)
- Total War (2000)
- Trails (2004)^{2}
- Trials (2000)
- Tropico (2001)
- Ty the Tasmanian Tiger (2002)
- Uncharted (2007) ^{1}
- Viewtiful Joe (2003)
- Viva Piñata (2006)
- Warhammer 40,000: Dawn of War (2004)
- Wii (2006)
- Wizard101 (2008)
- World of Warcraft (2004)^{2}
- WWF SmackDown! (2000) ^{2}
- Xenosaga (2002)
- Yakuza (2005)

Notes:

- ^{1}Game franchises that also accompany major film or television franchises.
- ^{2}Game franchises that are considered spin-offs of previously established franchises.

== Best-selling video games of the decade ==
The following table lists video games of the 2000s that have sold at least 10 million copies. Downloaded content may not be included into figures.

Best-selling video games of the 2000s (as of January 2020)
No.	Title	Units sold	Initial release date	Platform(s)	Genre(s)	Developer(s)	Publisher(s)	Ref
1	Wii Sports	82.88 million	November 19, 2006	Wii	Sports	Nintendo EAD (Group 2)	Nintendo	
2	Wii Fit and Wii Fit Plus	43.80 million	December 1, 2007	Wii	Exergaming	Nintendo EAD (Group 5)	Nintendo	
3	Mario Kart Wii	37.24 million	April 10, 2008	Wii	Kart racing	Nintendo EAD (Group 1)	Nintendo	
4	Wii Sports Resort	33.11 million	June 25, 2009	Wii	Sports	Nintendo EAD (Group 2)	Nintendo	
5	New Super Mario Bros.	30.80 million	May 15, 2006	Nintendo DS	Platformer	Nintendo EAD (Group 4)	Nintendo	
6	New Super Mario Bros. Wii	30.28 million	November 11, 2009	Wii	Platformer	Nintendo EAD (Group 4)	Nintendo	
7	Wii Play	28.02 million	December 2, 2006	Wii	Party	Nintendo EAD (Group 2)	Nintendo	
8	Grand Theft Auto: San Andreas	27.5 million	October 26, 2004	Multi-platform	Action-adventure	Rockstar North	Rockstar Games	
9	Grand Theft Auto IV	25.00 million	April 29, 2008	Multi-platform	Action-adventure	Rockstar North	Rockstar Games	
10	Nintendogs	23.96 million	April 21, 2005	Nintendo DS	Pet-raising simulation	Nintendo EAD (Group 1)	Nintendo	
11	Mario Kart DS	23.60 million	November 14, 2005	Nintendo DS	Kart racing	Nintendo EAD (Group 1)	Nintendo	
12	Call of Duty: Modern Warfare 2	22.70 million	November 10, 2009	Multi-platform	First-person shooter	Infinity Ward	Activision	
13	Grand Theft Auto: Vice City	20.00 million	October 29, 2002	Multi-platform	Action-adventure	Rockstar North	Rockstar Games	
14	Brain Age	19.01 million	May 19, 2005	Nintendo DS	Puzzle, educational	Nintendo SPD	Nintendo	
15	Pokémon Diamond and Pearl	17.67 million	September 28, 2006	Nintendo DS	Role-playing	Game Freak	The Pokémon Company, Nintendo	
16	Grand Theft Auto III	17.50 million	October 22, 2001	Multi-platform	Action-adventure	DMA Design	Rockstar Games	
17	Pokémon Ruby and Sapphire	16.22 million	November 21, 2002	Game Boy Advance	Role-playing	Game Freak	The Pokémon Company, Nintendo	
18	The Sims	16.00 million	January 31, 2000	Multi-platform	Life simulation	Maxis	Electronic Arts	
19	Need for Speed: Most Wanted	16.00 million	November 11, 2005	Multi-platform	Racing	EA Canada, EA Black Box	Electronic Arts	
20	Gran Turismo 3: A-Spec	14.89 million	April 28, 2001	PlayStation 2	Sim racing	Polyphony Digital	Sony Computer Entertainment	
21	Brain Age 2	14.88 million	December 29, 2005	Nintendo DS	Puzzle, educational	Nintendo SDD	Nintendo	
22	Halo 3	14.50 million	September 25, 2007	Xbox 360	First-person shooter	Bungie	Microsoft Game Studios	
23	Super Smash Bros. Brawl	13.30 million	January 31, 2008	Wii	Fighting	Game Arts, HAL Laboratory, Sora Ltd.	Nintendo	
24	Super Mario Galaxy	12.79 million	November 1, 2007	Wii	Platformer	Nintendo EAD (Group 1)	Nintendo	
25	Pokémon HeartGold and SoulSilver	12.72 million	September 12, 2009	Nintendo DS	Role-playing	Game Freak	The Pokémon Company, Nintendo	
26	Pokémon FireRed and LeafGreen	12.00 million	January 29, 2004	Game Boy Advance	Role-playing	Game Freak	The Pokémon Company, Nintendo	
27	Gran Turismo 4	11.76 million	December 28, 2004	PlayStation 2	Sim racing	Polyphony Digital	Sony Computer Entertainment	
28	Animal Crossing: Wild World	11.75 million	November 23, 2005	Nintendo DS	Social simulation	Nintendo EAD (Group 2)	Nintendo	
29	Super Mario 64 DS	11.06 million	November 21, 2004	Nintendo DS	Platformer	Nintendo EAD Comprehensive Group	Nintendo	

== Hardware timeline ==
The following gallery highlights hardware used to predominantly play games throughout the 2000s.

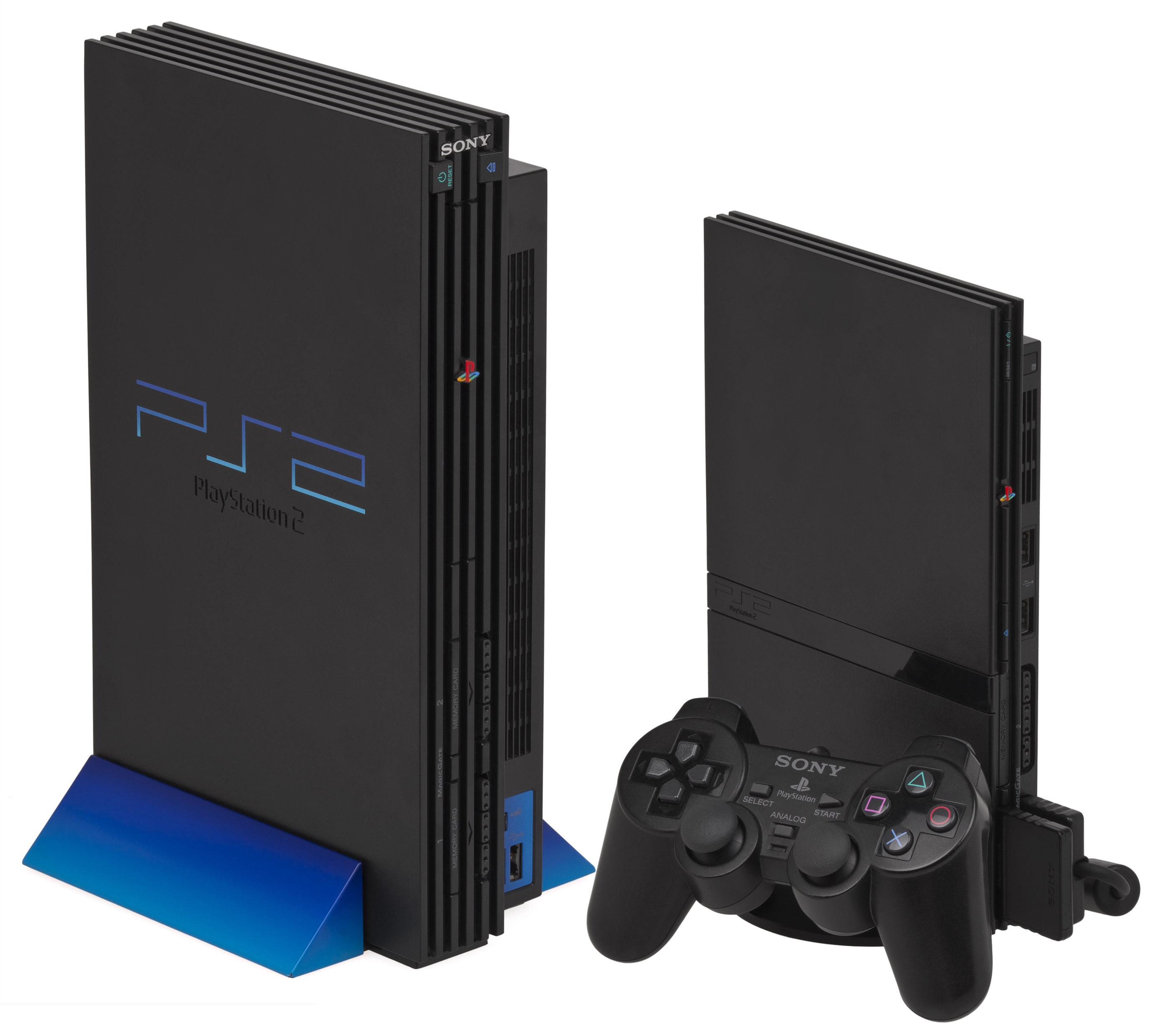
PlayStation 2 (2000)

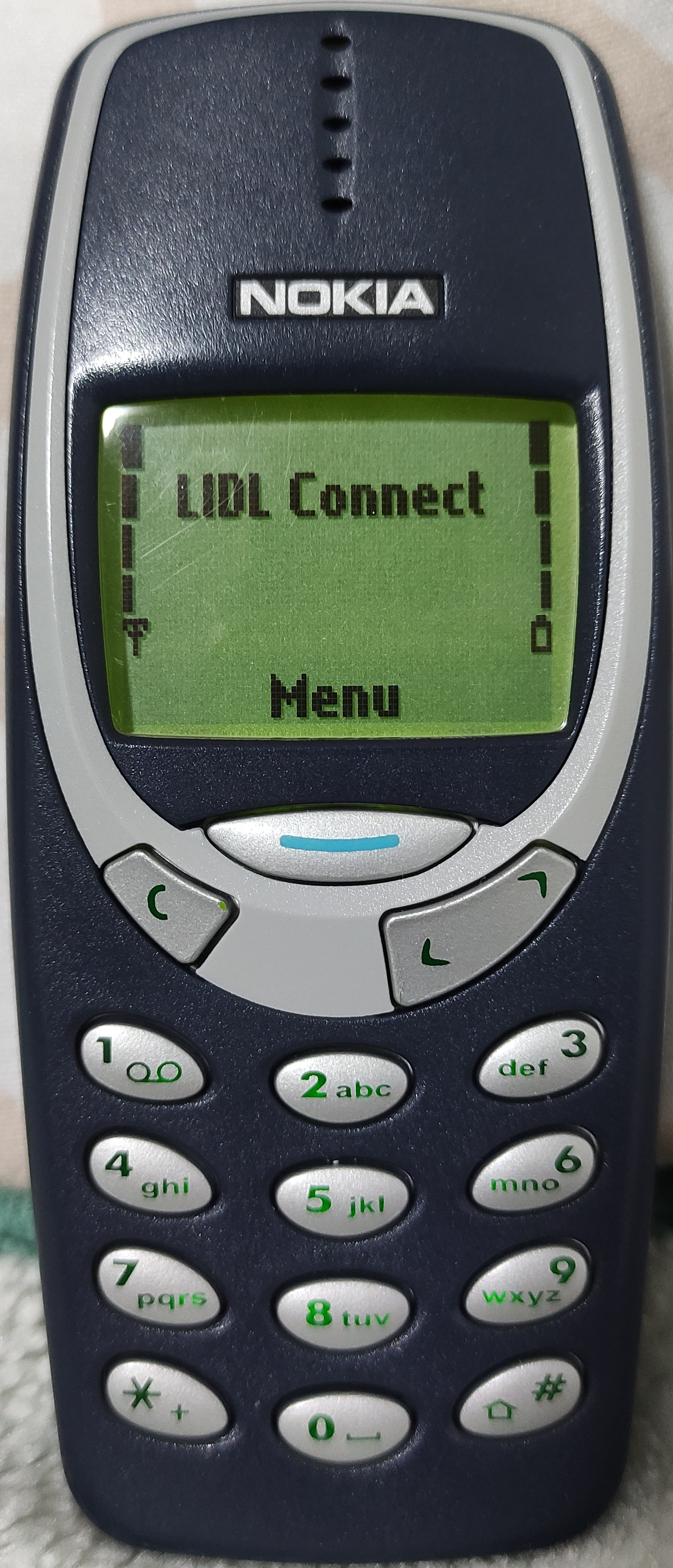
Snake II on a Nokia 3310 (2000)

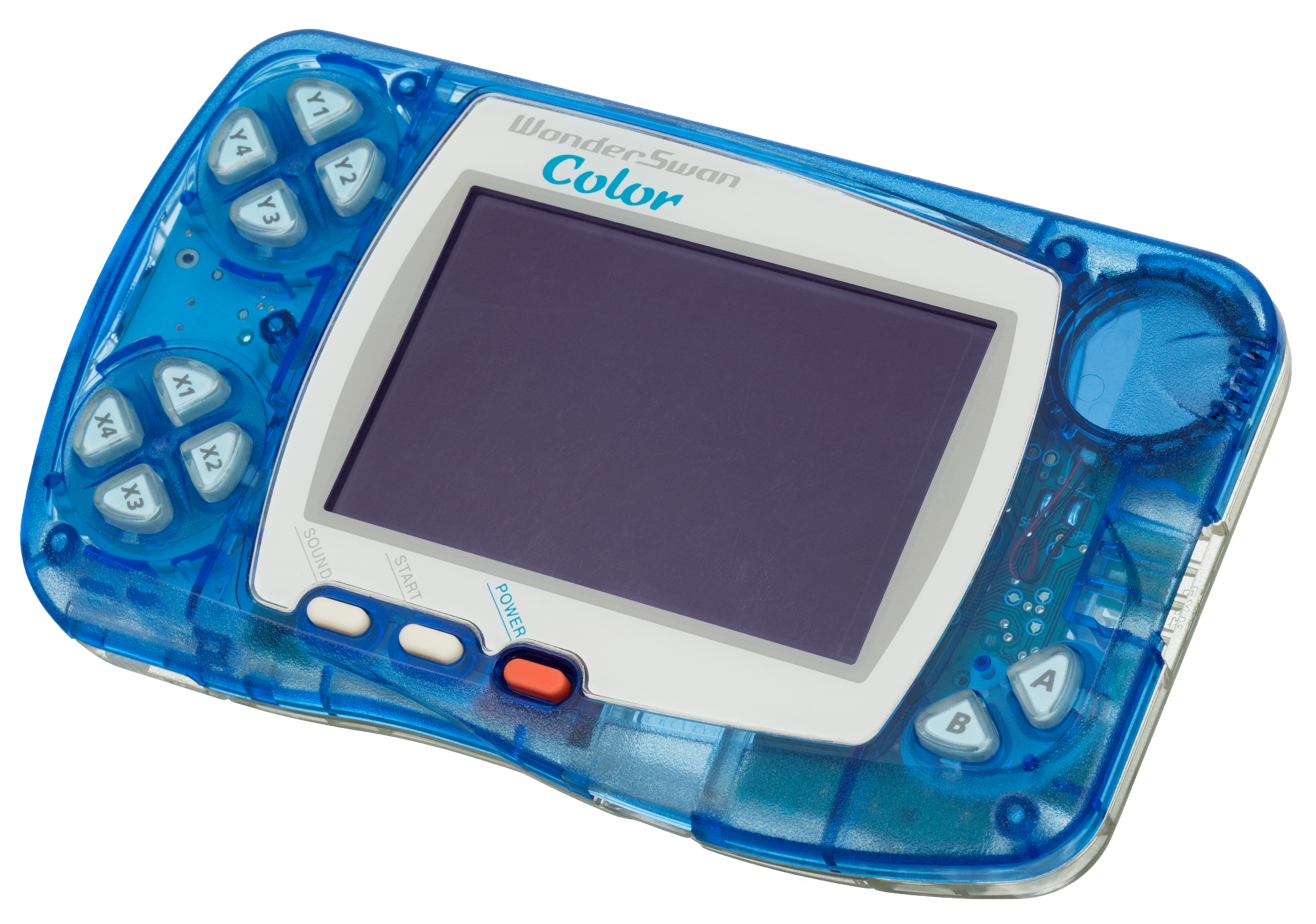
WonderSwan Color (2000)

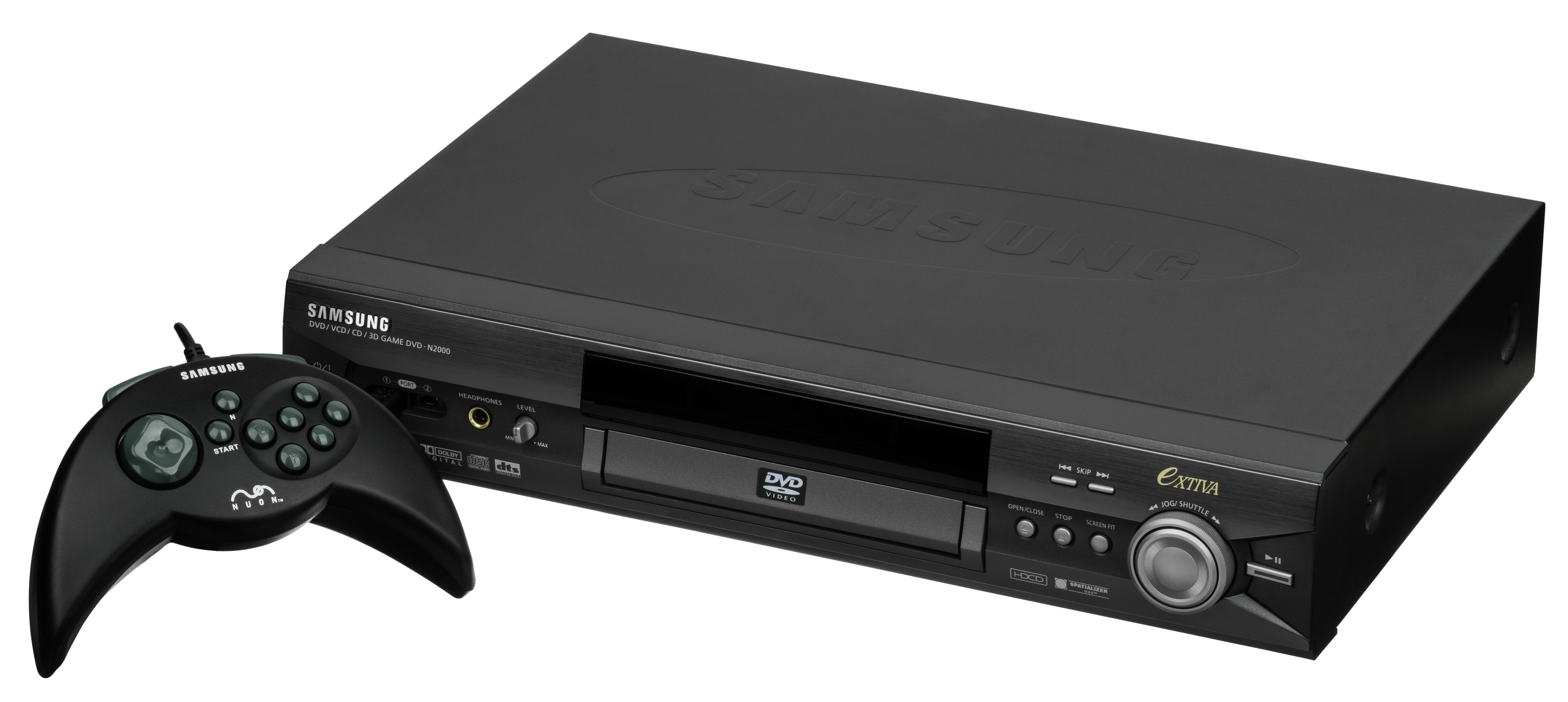
Nuon (2000)

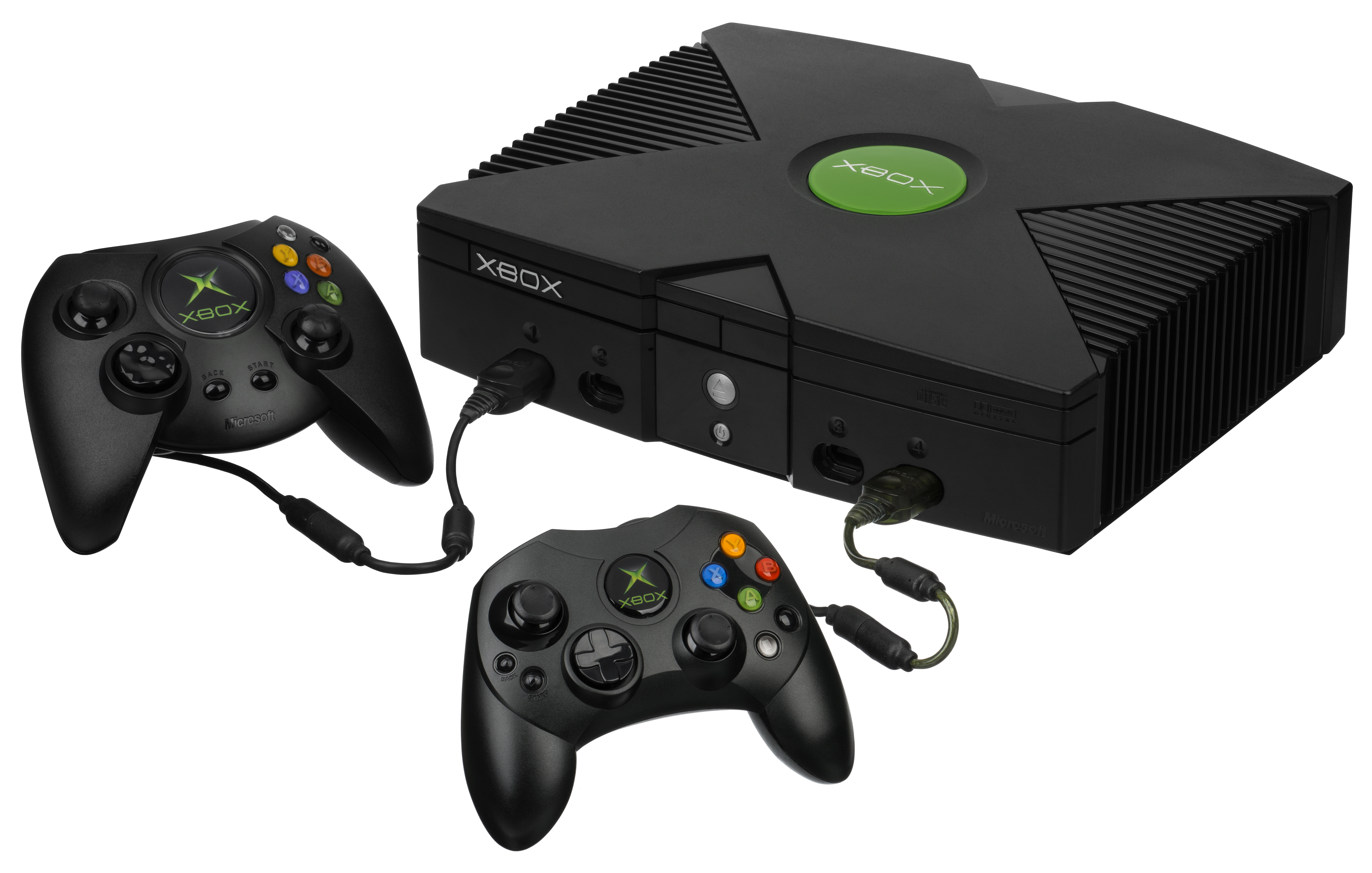
Xbox (2001)

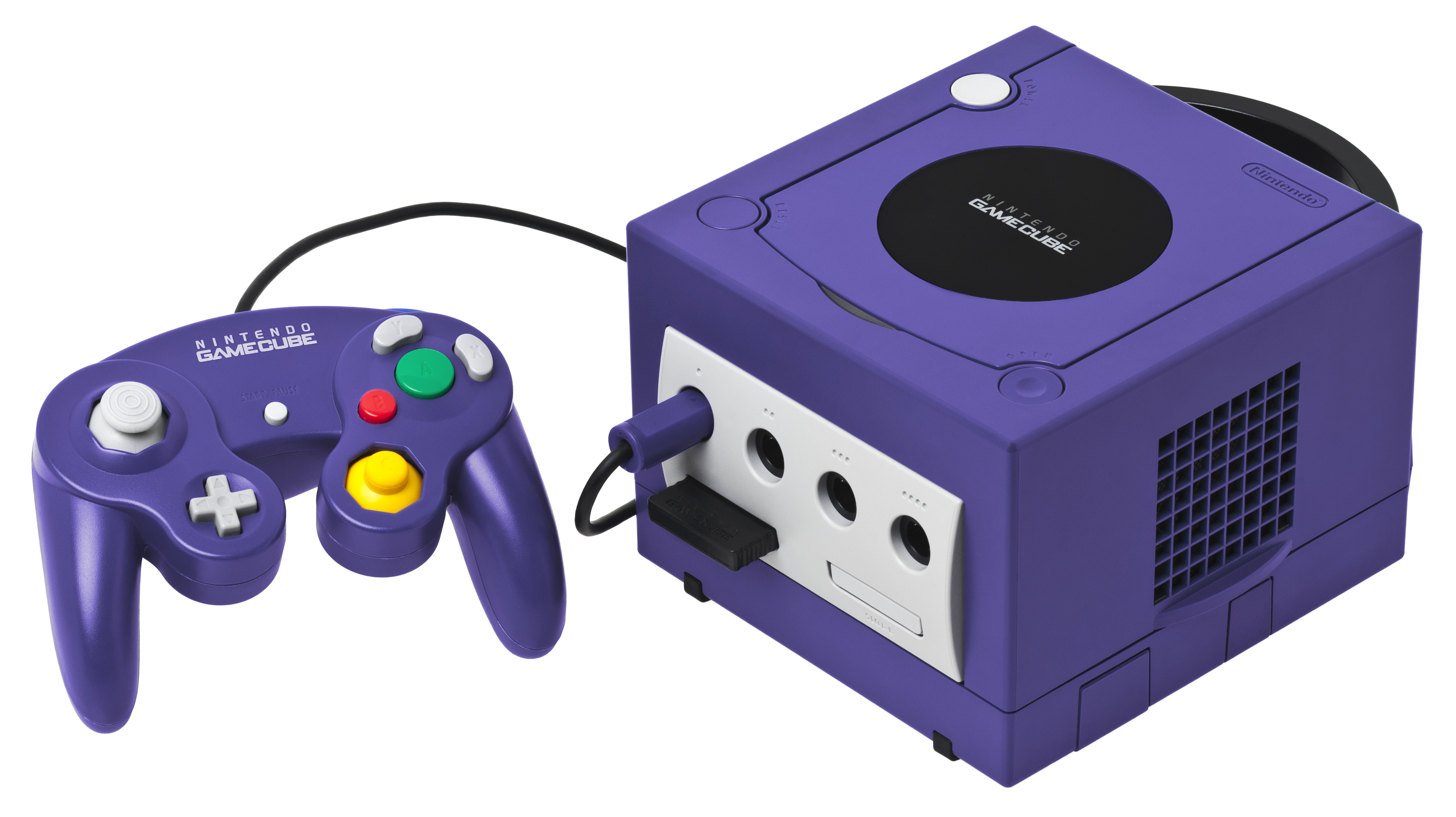
GameCube (2001)

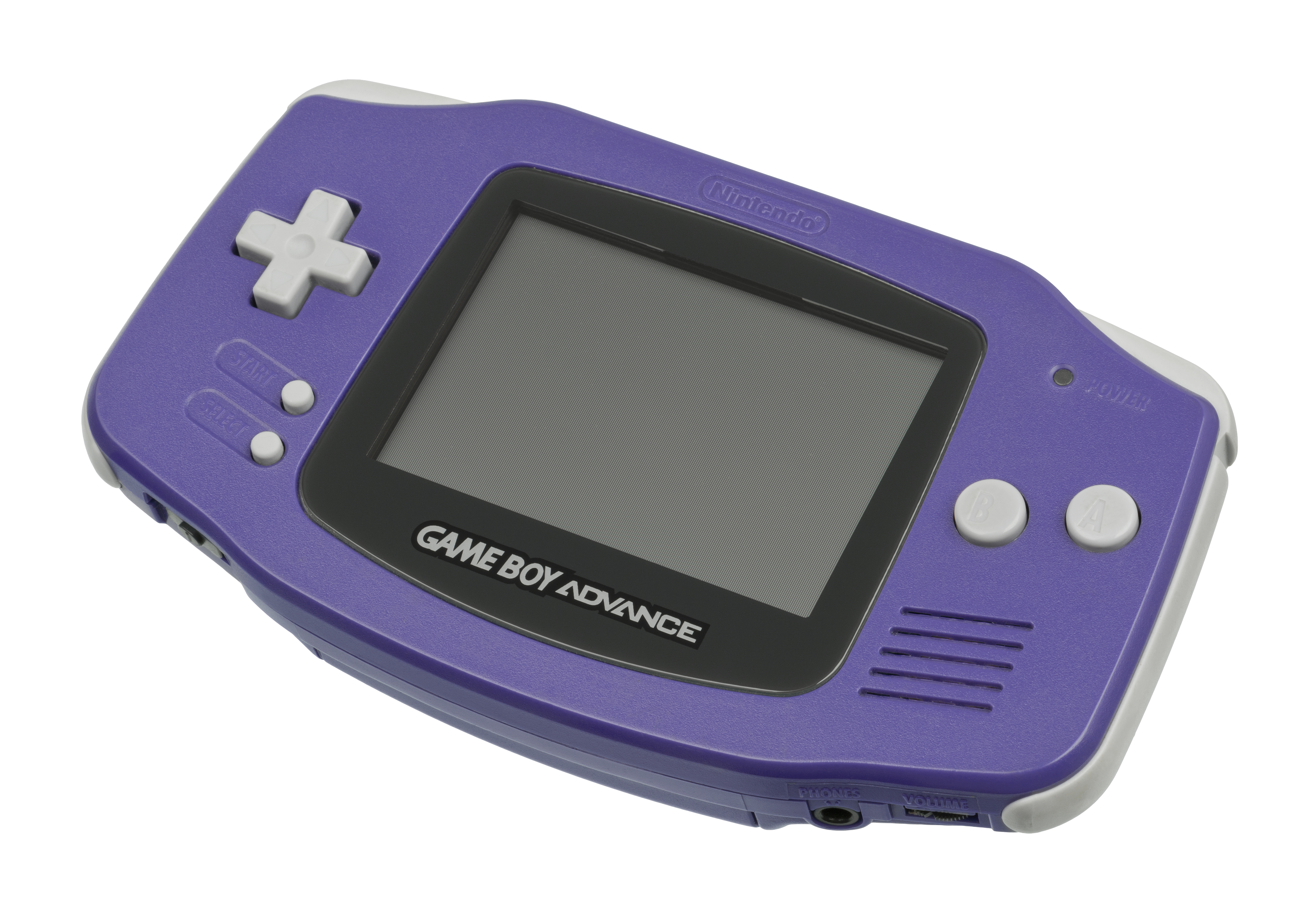
Game Boy Advance (2001)

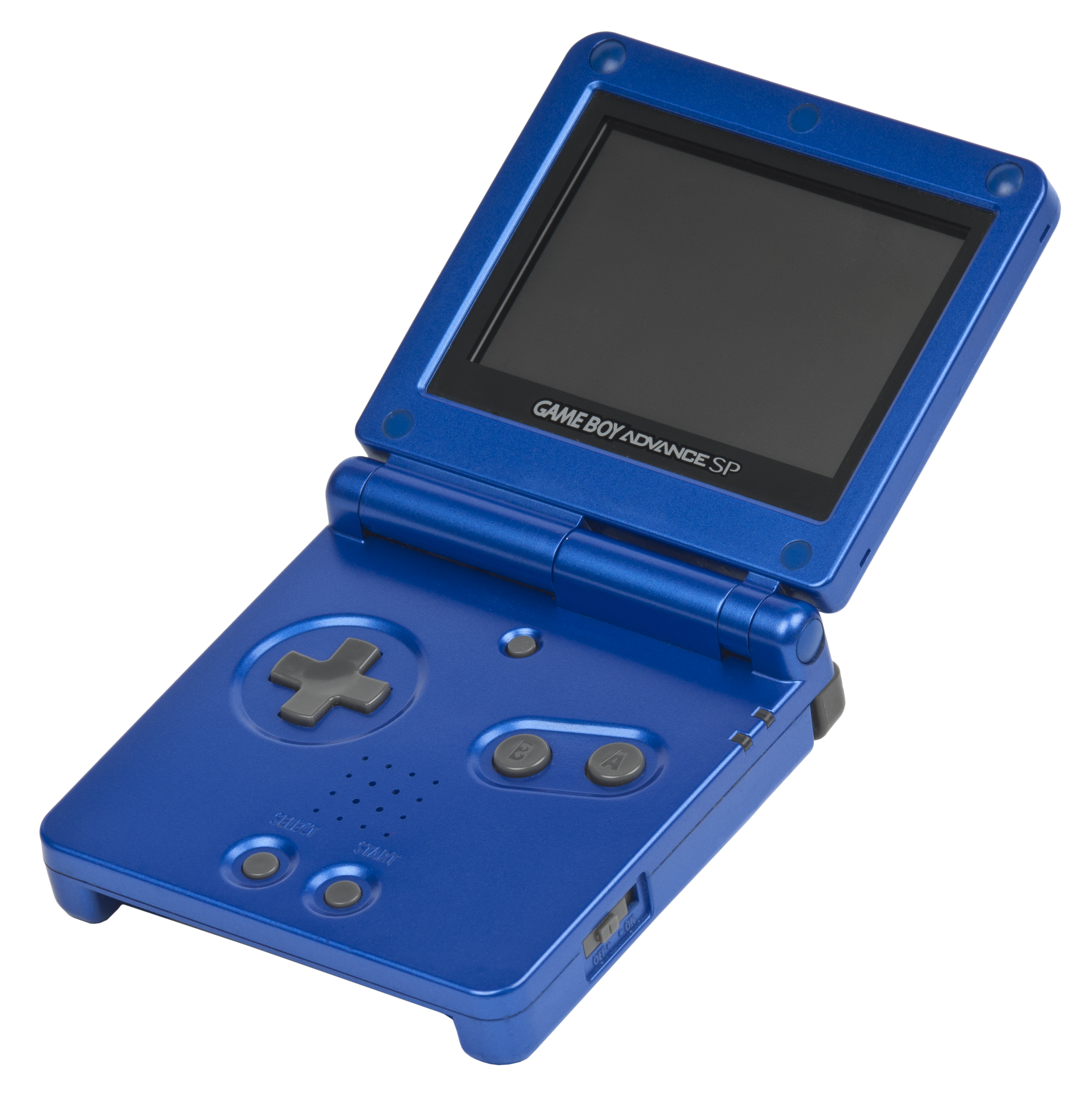
Game Boy Advance SP (2003)

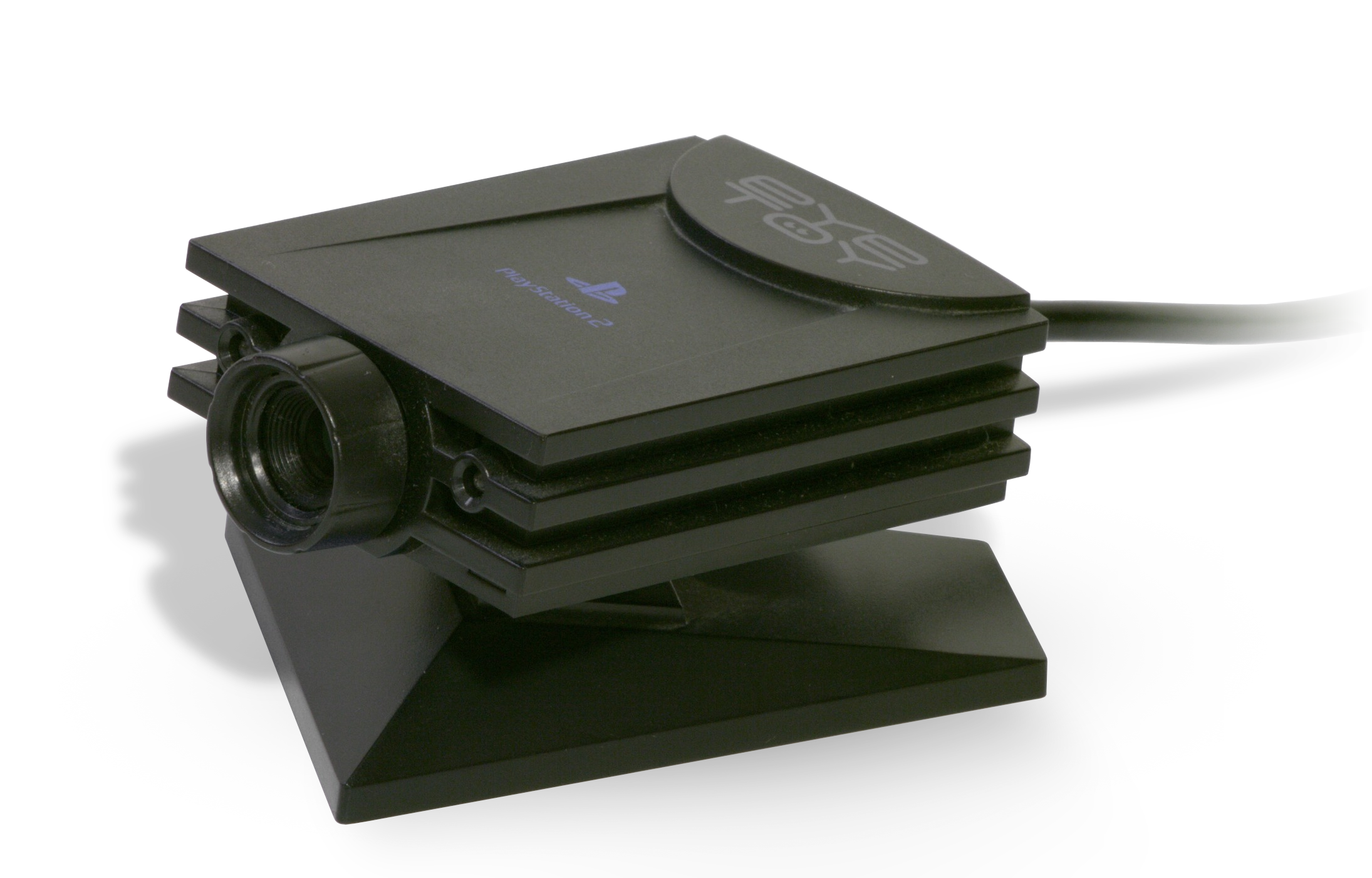
EyeToy (2003)

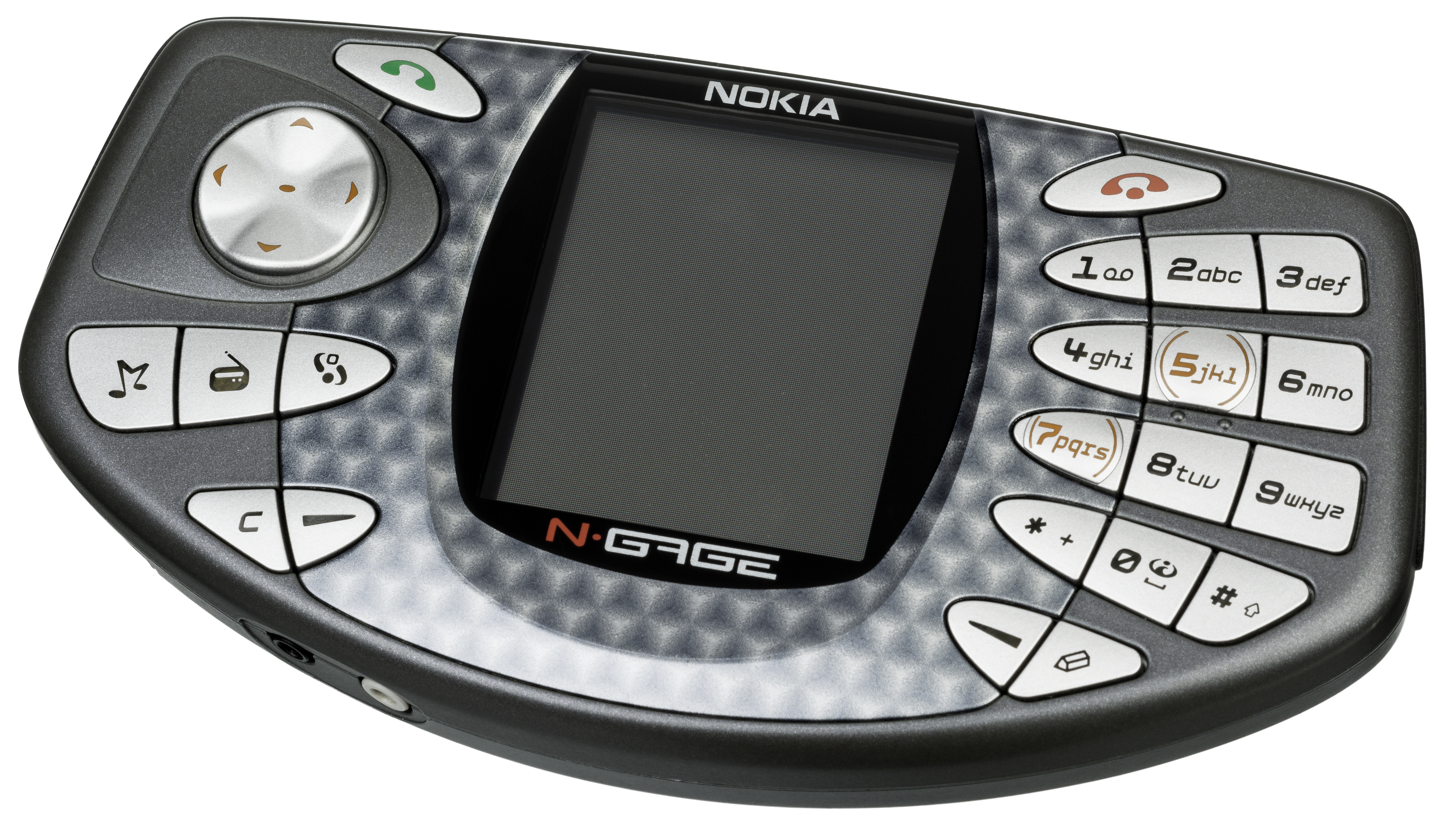
N-Gage (2003)

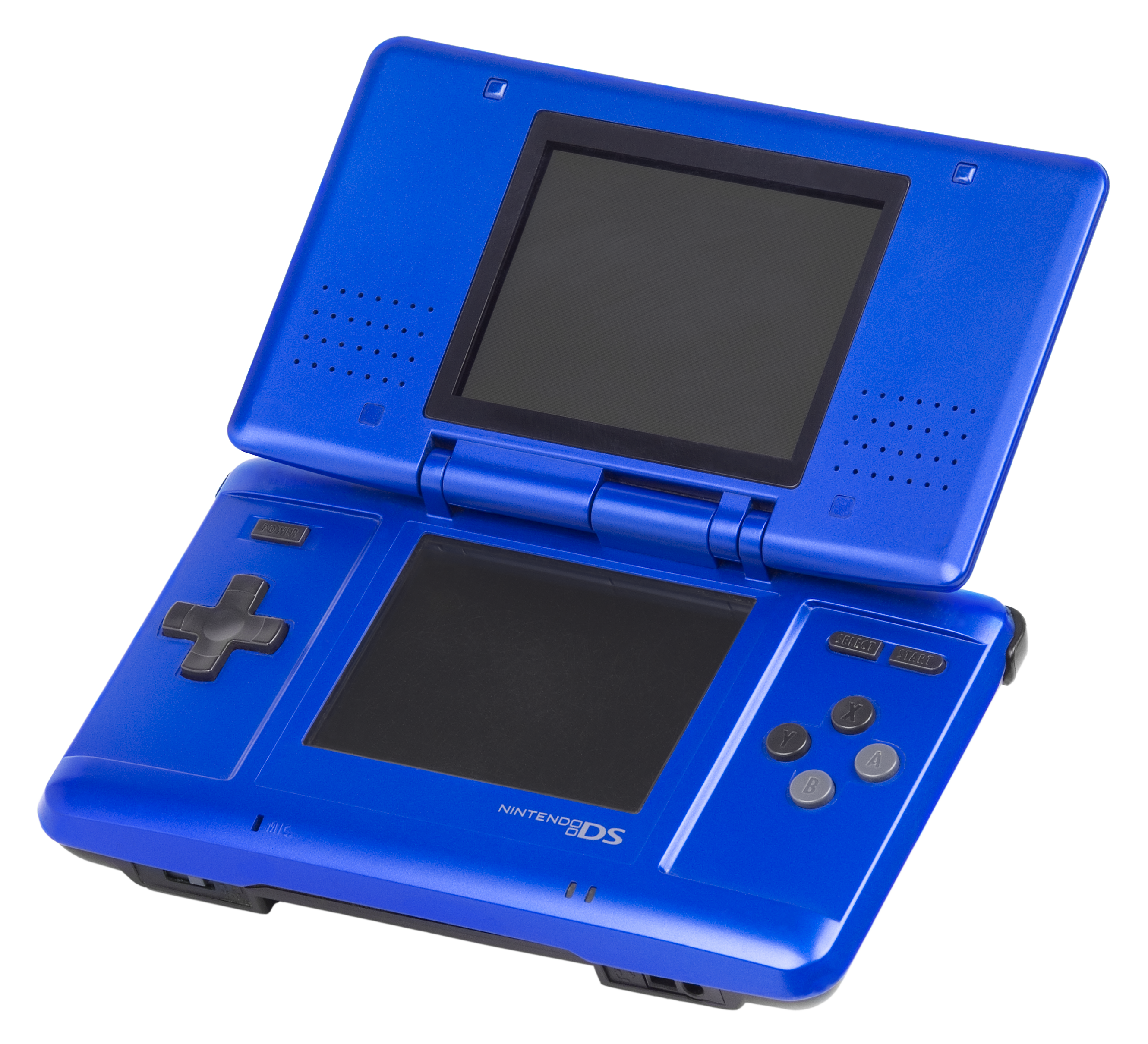
Nintendo DS (2004)

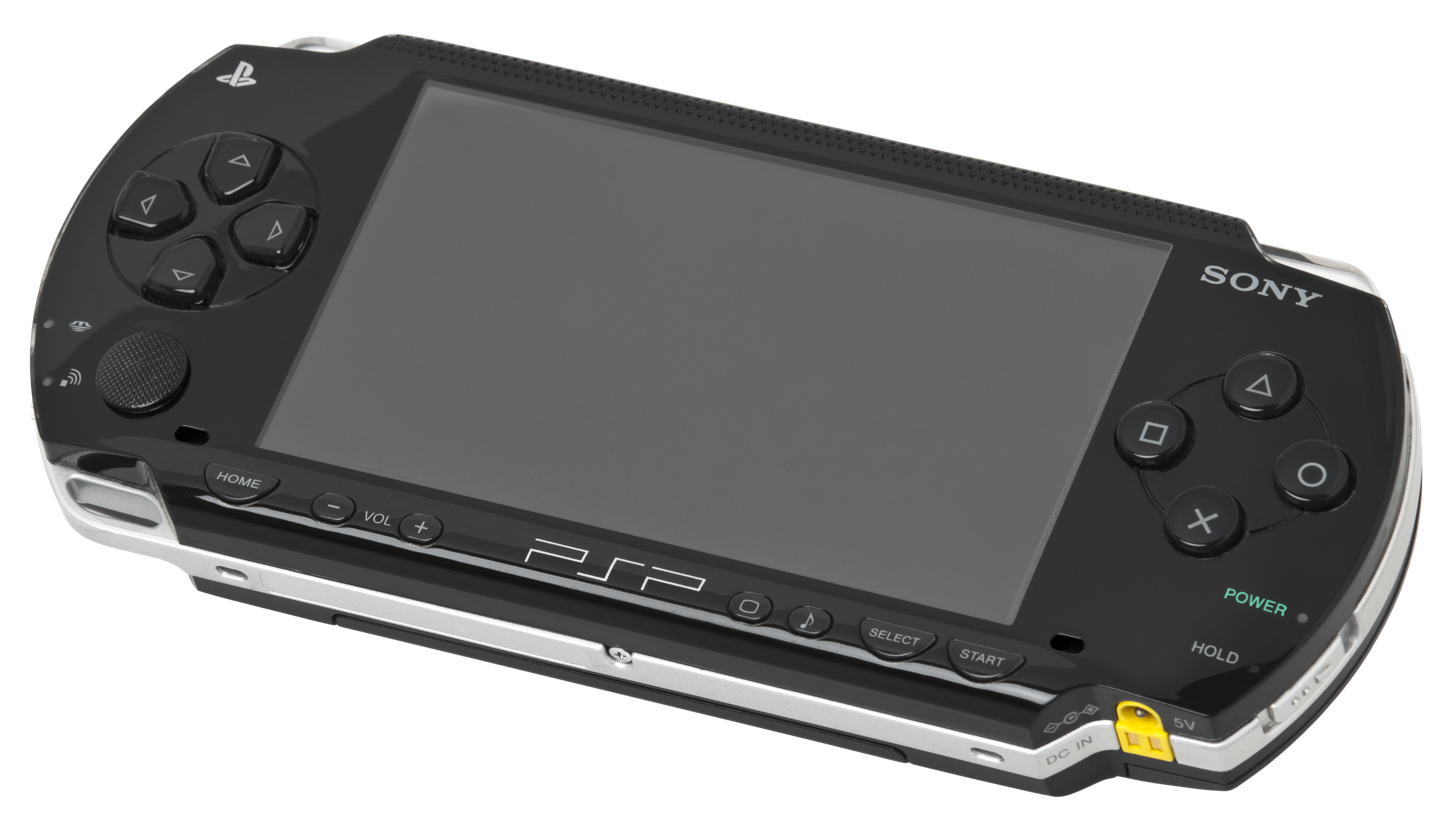
PlayStation Portable (2004)

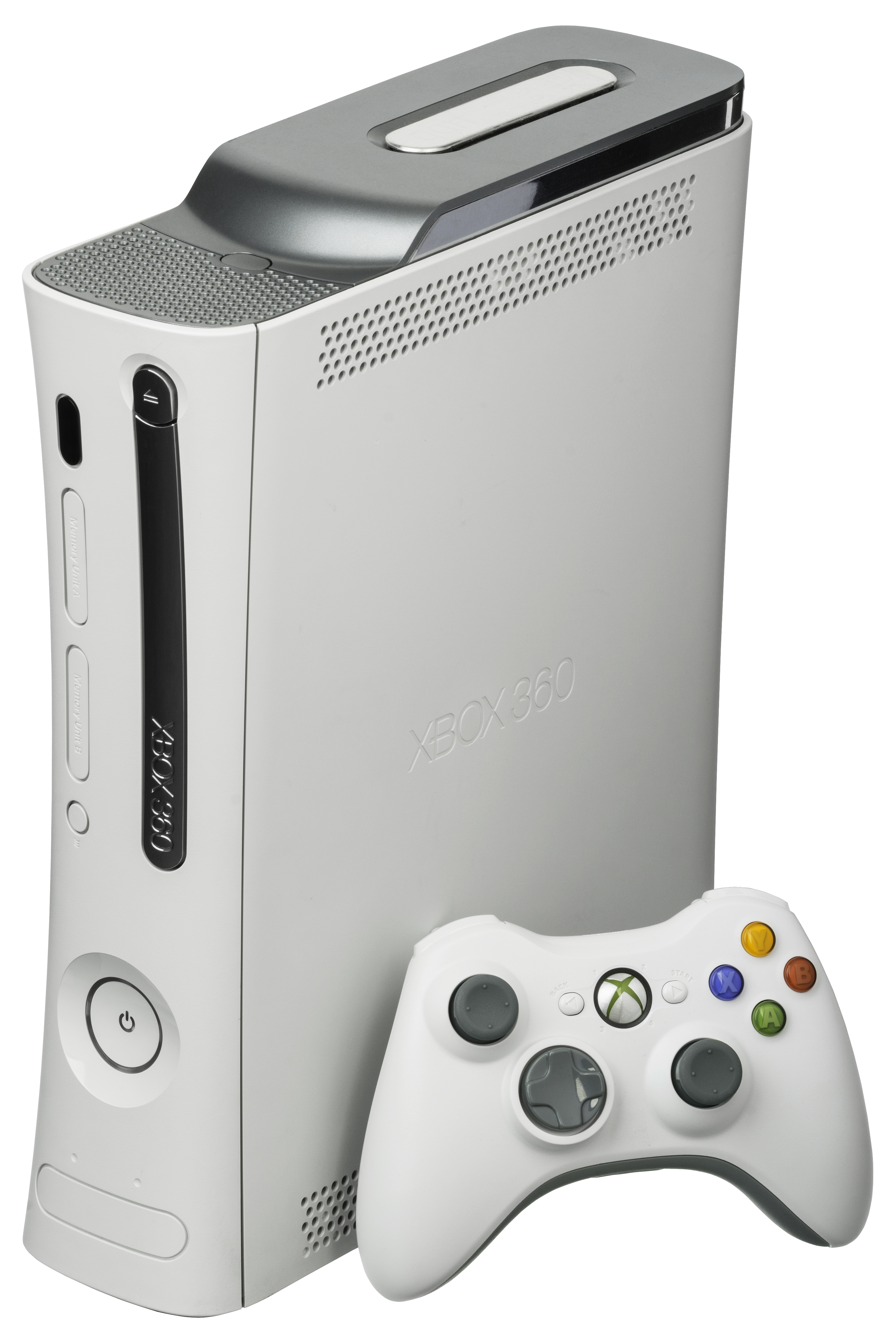
Xbox 360 (2005)

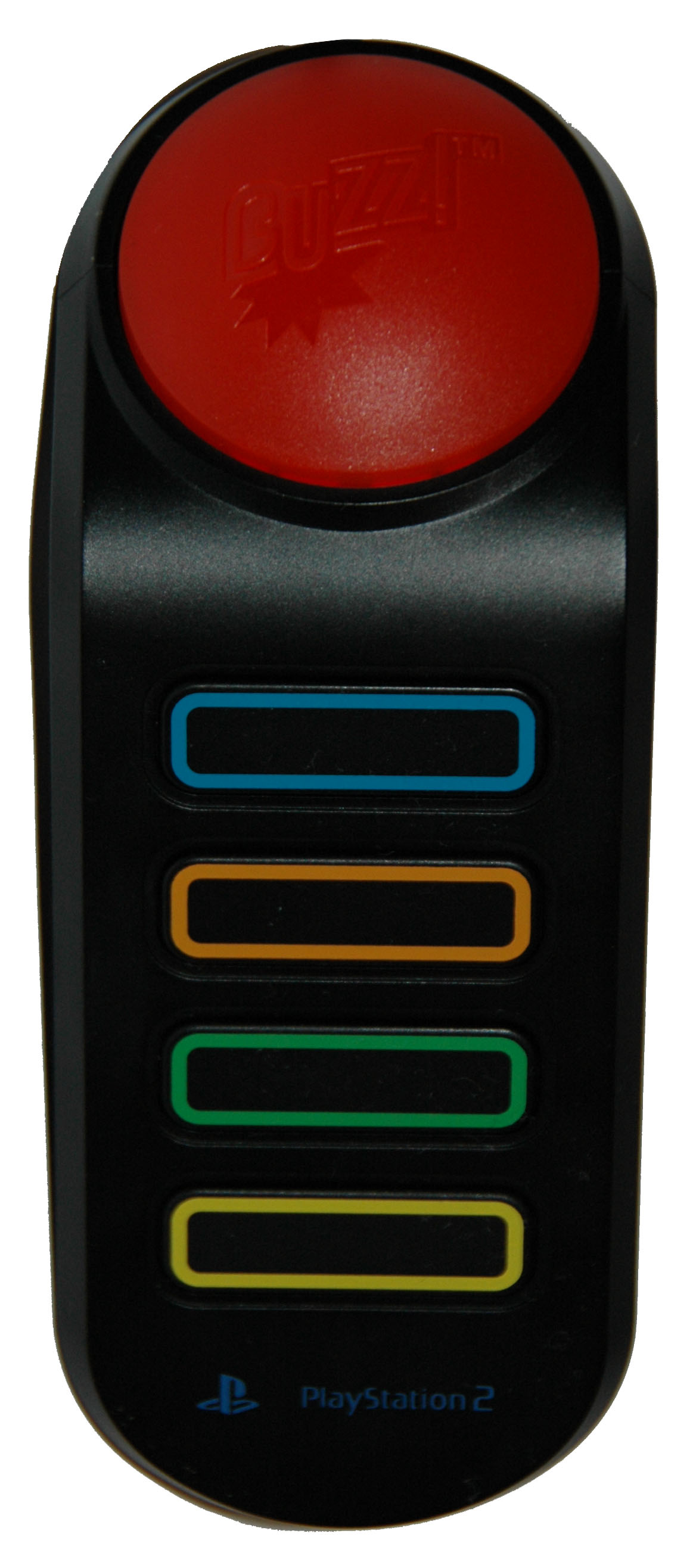
Buzz! controller (2005)

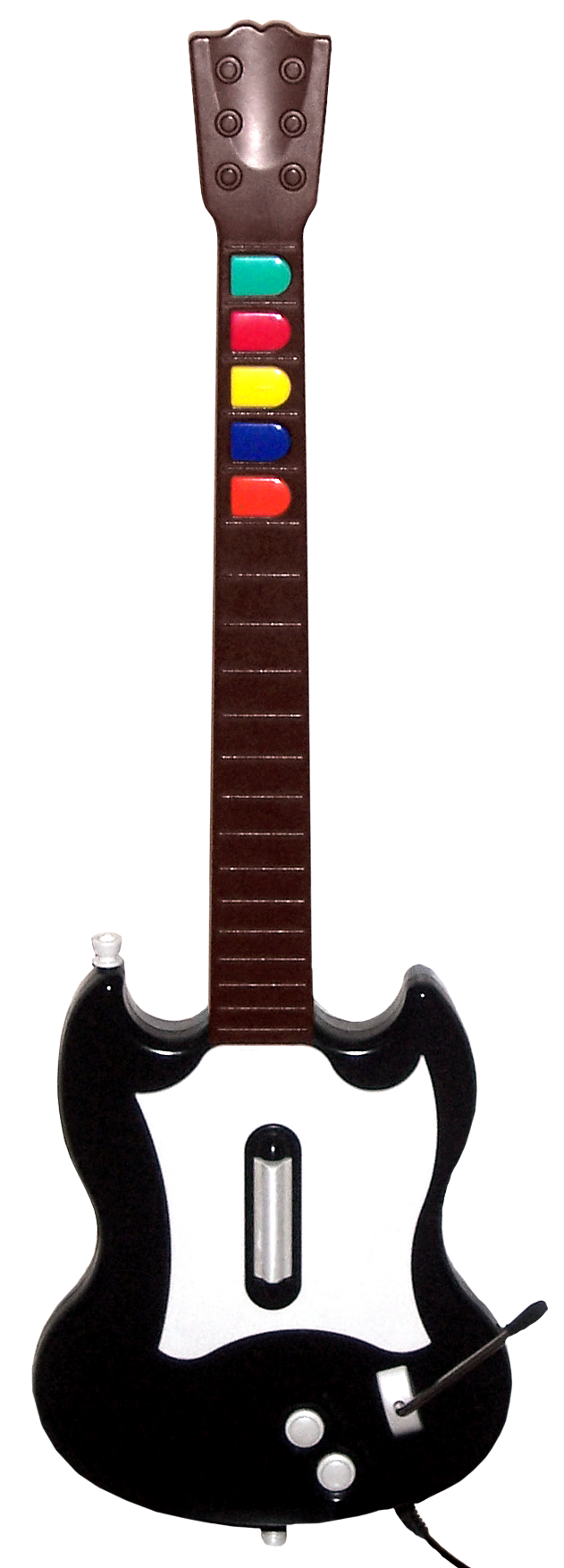
Guitar Hero controller (2005)

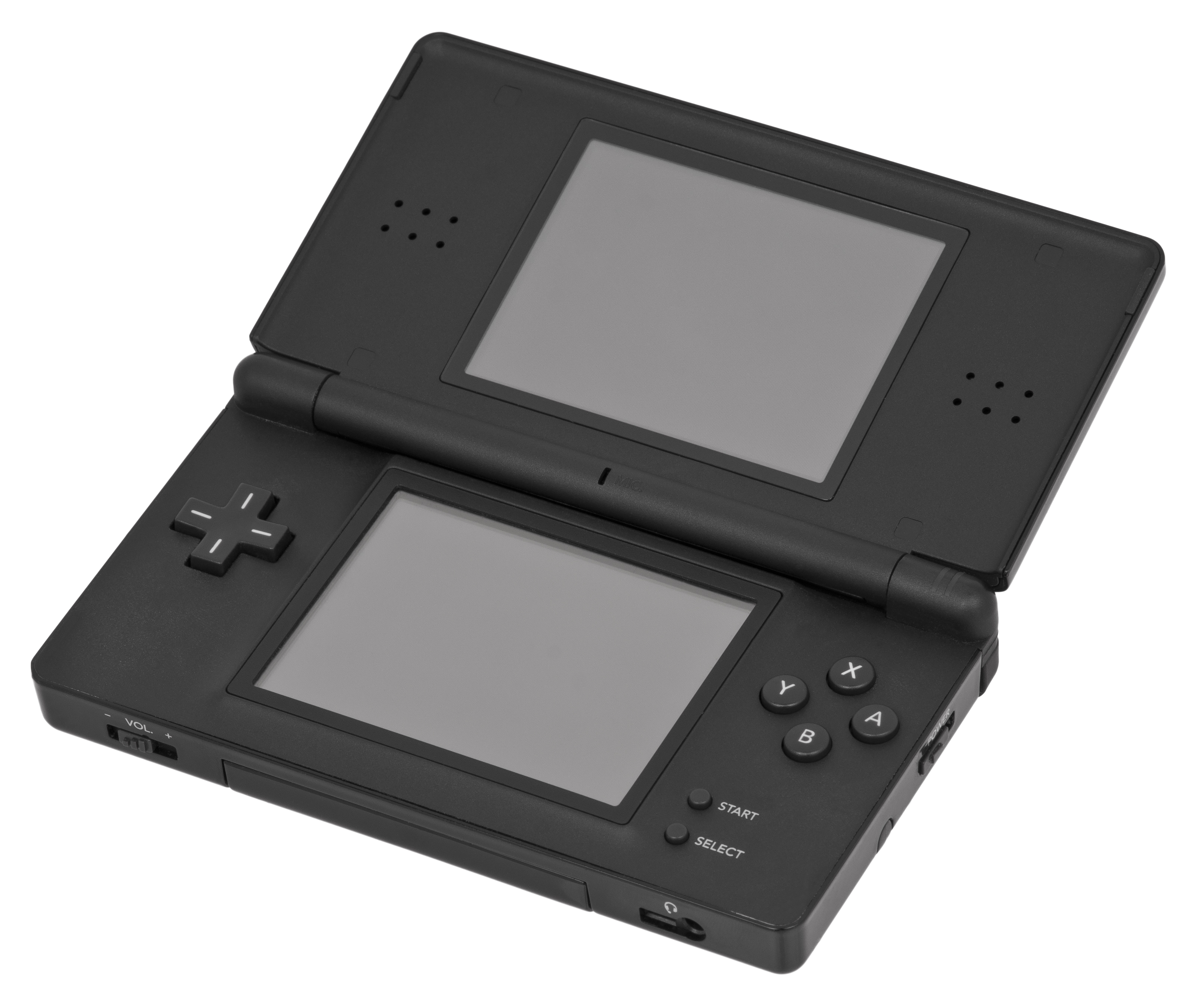
Nintendo DS Lite (2006)

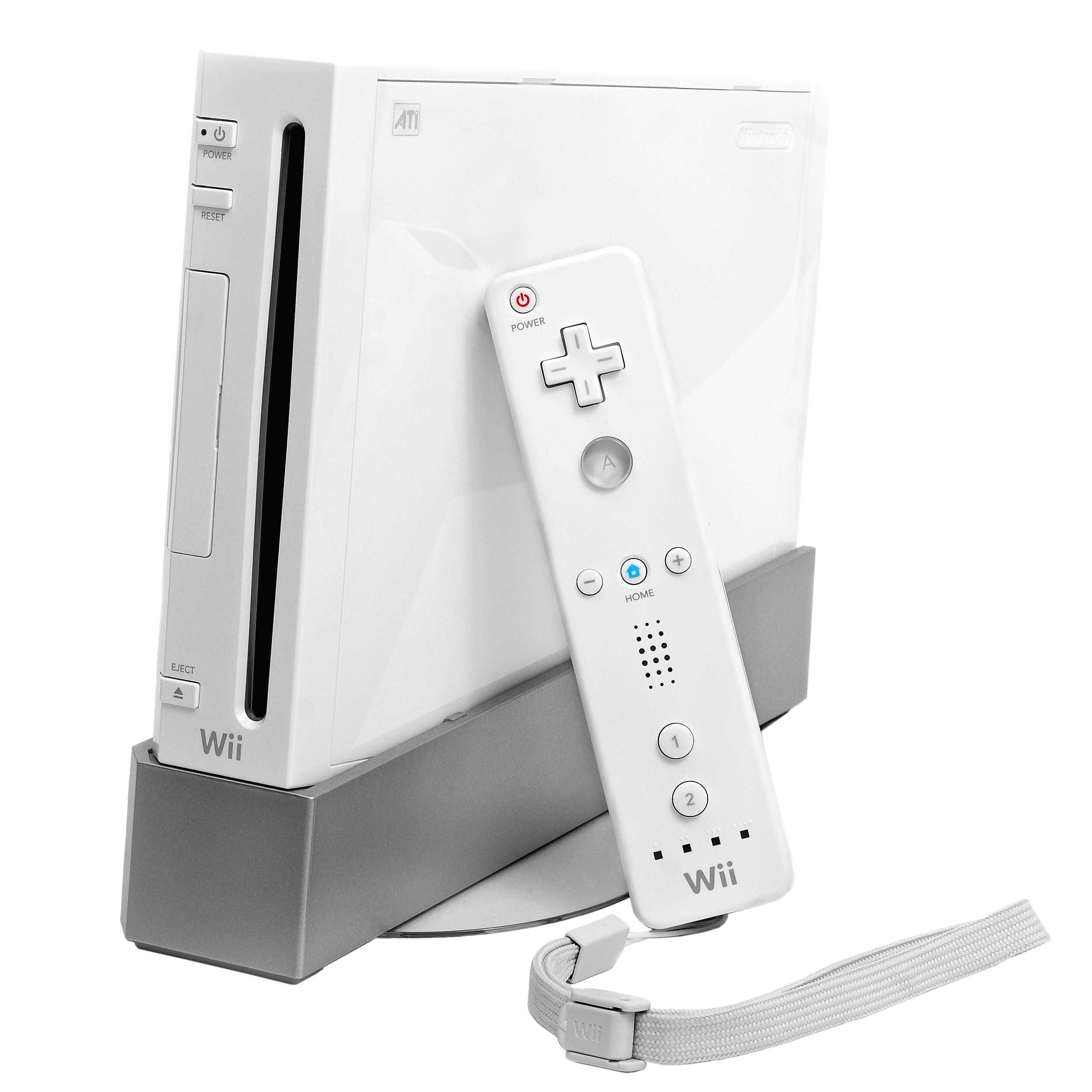
Wii (2006)

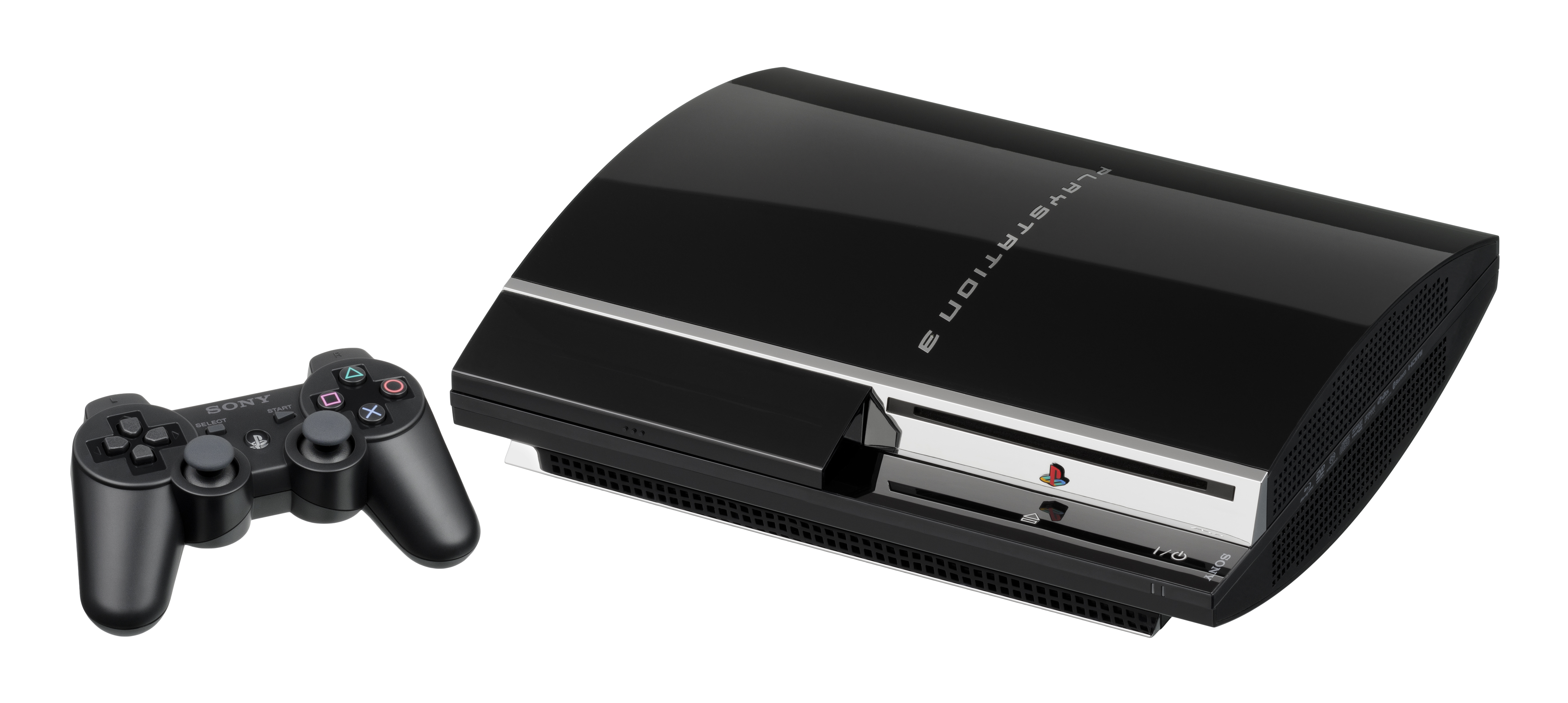
PlayStation 3 (2006)

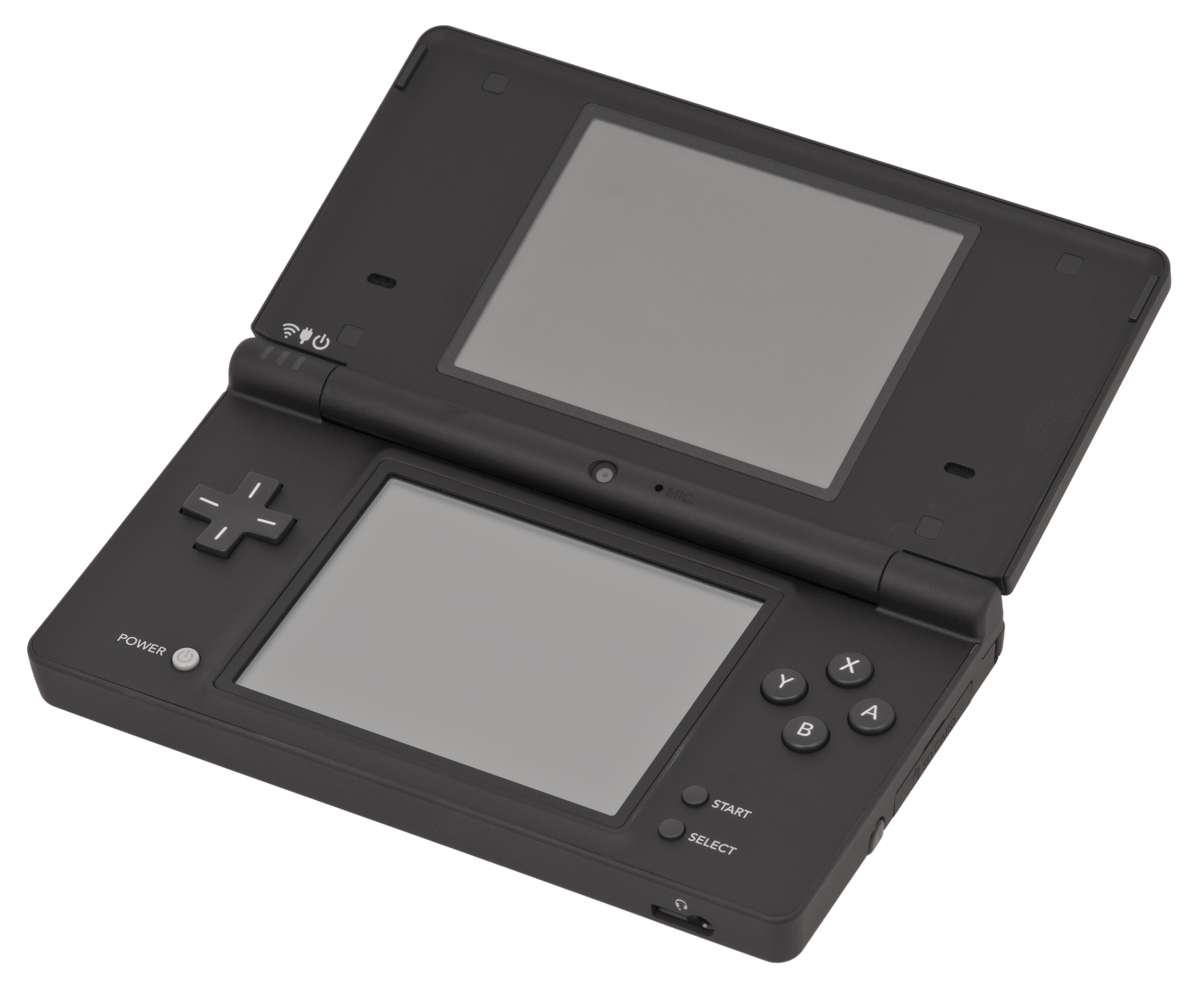
Nintendo DSi (2008)

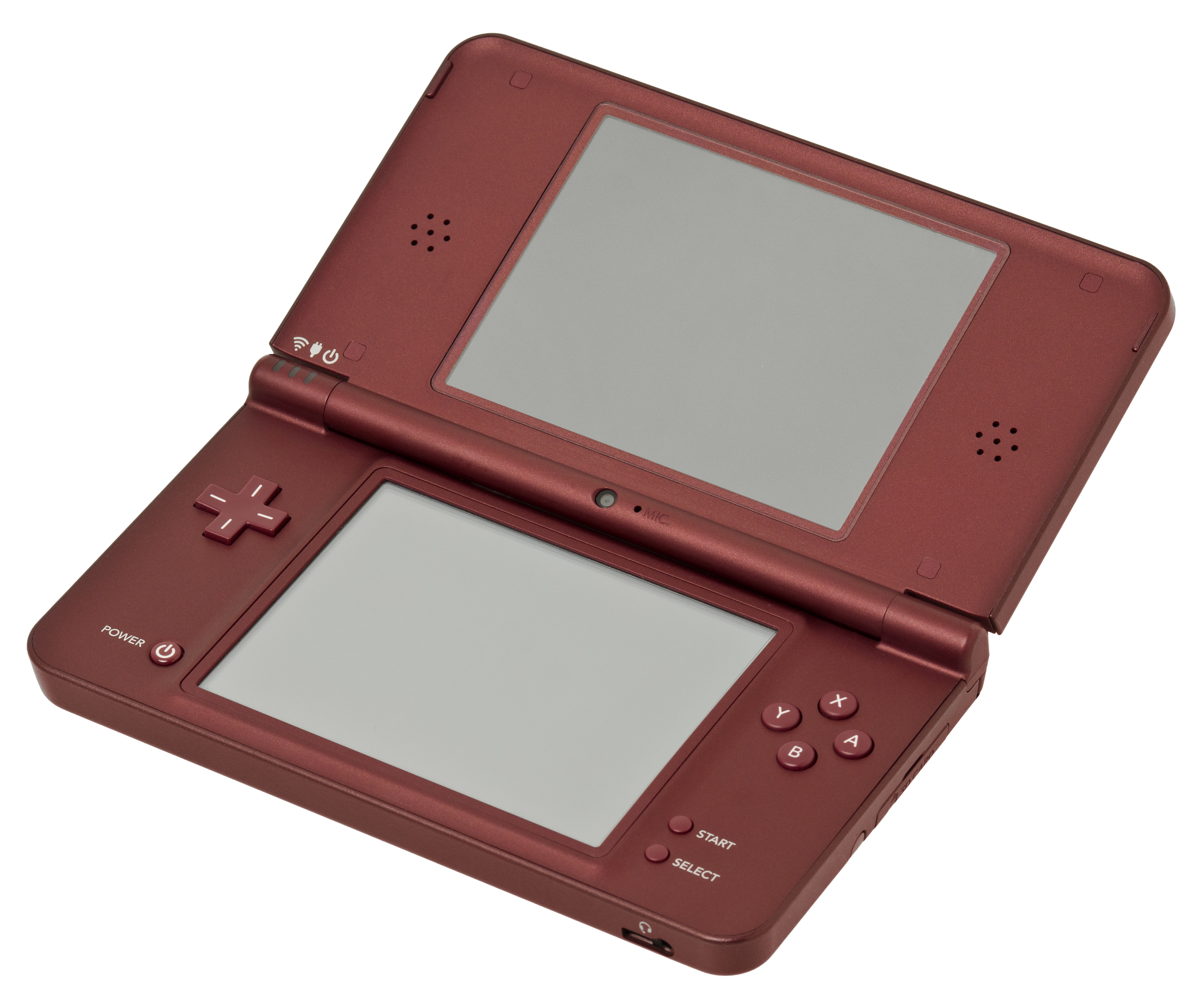
Nintendo DSi XL (2009)

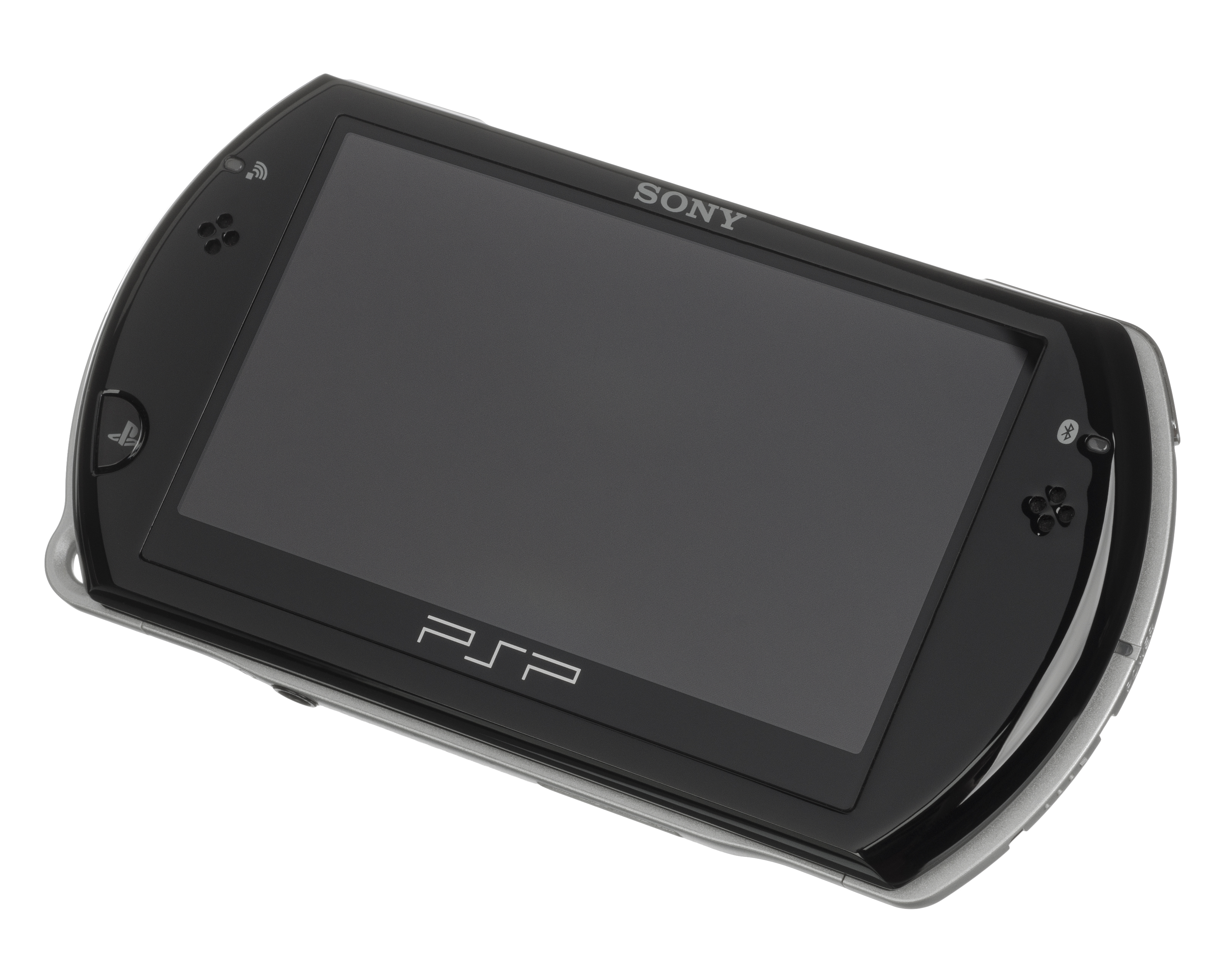
PSP Go (2009)
