= Family Guy: Uncensored =

2009 video game

- Developer: Glu Mobile
- Publisher: Glu Mobile
- Series: Family Guy
- Platforms: iOS, Android
- Release: WW: September 23, 2009
- Genre: Action game
- Mode: Single-player

Family Guy: Uncensored is an iOS and Android game developed and published by Glu Mobile. It was published on September 23, 2009.

== Reception ==
Family Guy: Uncensored

Aggregate score
Aggregator	Score
GameRankings	51.00%

Review scores
Publication	Score
IGN	4.5/10
AppSpy	2/5
Common Sense Media	2/5
Slide to Play	2/4
TouchArcade	2/5

Family Guy: Uncensored received mixed reviews from critics. Aggregating review website, GameRankings, provides an average rating of 51.00% based on 5 reviews

== See also ==
- List of Family Guy video games
