= List of Family Guy video games =

Family Guy is an American animated sitcom created by Seth MacFarlane for the Fox Broadcasting Company. The main characters of the show are Peter Griffin, his wife Lois, their elder daughter Meg, son Chris, their dog Brian and the most recent child Stewie. The popularity of the series prompted several video game developers to create video games based on the series.

Video games based on the series have been on multiple platforms since the first game's debut in 2006. The first video game, Family Guy Video Game! was developed by High Voltage Software and published by 2K Games for the PlayStation 2, Xbox and PlayStation Portable. Since then, another video game has been made for PlayStation 3, Xbox 360 and Microsoft Windows called Family Guy: Back to the Multiverse developed by Heavy Iron Studios and published by Activision.

== Video games ==
As of 2024, 18 video games based on Family Guy have been published.

Key
Blank cell indicates title was not released on any platform(s) by the specified manufacturers
Cell with games console(s) indicates title was released on platform(s) by the specified manufacturers

List of Family Guy video games
Title	Release details	Platform(s)		
Title	Release details	Microsoft	Sony	Other
Brian's Shoot 'em Up Bar	Released: 1999(?); Publisher: 20th Century Fox; Developer: 20th Century Fox			Browser (Shockwave/Flash)
Stewie's Candle Blaster	Released: 2003; Publisher: 20th Century Fox; Developer: 20th Century Fox			Browser (Flash)
Near Death Golf!	Released: 2003; Publisher: 20th Century Fox; Developer: 20th Century Fox			Browser (Flash)
Family Guy Slots	Released: 2005; Publisher: 20th Century Fox; Developer: Fanscape			Browser (Flash)
Family Guy: Stewie 2.0	Released: October 27, 2005; Publisher: Airborne; Developer: Airborne			Java (J2ME)
American Dad! vs. Family Guy Kung-Fu II Turbo! Hyper-Mega Edition	Released: 2006; Publisher: 20th Century Fox; Developer: Fuel Industries			Browser (Flash)
Family Guy: Air Griffin	Released: June 1, 2006; Publisher: Airborne; Developer: Airborne			Java (J2ME)
Family Guy DVD Blast!	Released: 2006; Publisher: Screenlife; Developer: Screenlife			DVD Game
Family Guy Video Game!	Released: October 2, 2006; Publisher: 2K Games; Developer: High Voltage Software	Xbox	PS2; PSP	
Family Guy: Stewie's Arsenal	Released: September 30, 2007; Publisher: Airborne; Developer: Airborne			Java (J2ME)
Family Guy: Save the Couch	Released: 2009; Publisher: Two Animators!; Developer: 20th Century Fox			Browser (Flash)
Family Guy: Uncensored	Released: May 21, 2009; Publisher: Glu Mobile; Developer: Glu Mobile			iOS, Android, Java (J2ME)
Family Guy: Time Warped (Family Guy 2)	Released: November 25, 2010; Publisher: Glu Mobile; Developer: Glu Mobile			iOS, Android, Java (J2ME)
Family Guy Online	Released: 2012; Publisher: 20th Century Fox Video Games; Developer: Roadhouse Interactive			Browser (Unity)
Back to the Multiverse	Released: November 20, 2012; Publisher: Activision; Developer: Heavy Iron Studios	360	PS3	PC
Family Guy: The Quest for Stuff	Released: April 10, 2014; Publisher: Fox Digital Entertainment; Developer: TinyCo			iOS, Android, Amazon Appstore
Family Guy Pinball	Released: October 22, 2015; Publisher: Zen Studios; Developer: Zen Studios			iOS, Android, Amazon Appstore
Family Guy: Another Freakin' Mobile Game	Released: April 22, 2017; Publisher: Fox Digital Entertainment; Developer: Jam City			iOS, Android, Amazon Appstore

== See also ==
- List of video game franchises
