= David Macey =

British translator and historian (1949–2011)

- Macey's publicity photograph
- Born: 5 October 1949; Sunderland, England
- Died: 7 October 2011 (aged 62)
- Education: University College London
- Occupations: Historian; biographer; translator
- Spouse: Margaret Atack (m. 1988)

David Macey (5 October 1949 – 7 October 2011) was an English translator and intellectual historian of the French left. He translated around sixty books from French to English, and wrote biographical studies of Jacques Lacan, Michel Foucault and Frantz Fanon.

== Life ==
David Macey was born in Sunderland and grew up in Houghton-le-Spring. His father was a miner who had been sent down the pit aged fourteen, and his mother a woman whose family had been unable to afford for her to take up a grammar school place. Macey was educated at Durham Johnston Grammar School and went on to study French at University College London, where he wrote a PhD on Paul Nizan.

Interested in trying to link Marxism and psychoanalysis, Macey became a prolific contributor to Radical Philosophy. From 1974, he taught part-time at North London Polytechnic, UCL and City University London. In 1975, he was a founding member of the British Campaign for an Independent East Timor. After his partner Margaret Atack took a permanent post at Leeds University in 1981, Macey left academia to become a full-time writer and translator. Later, in 1995, he was appointed research associate in the French department of Leeds University; in 2010, he became special professor in translation at the University of Nottingham.

Macey married Atack in 1988, and they adopted three children.

== Selected works ==
=== Translations ===
- Jacques Lacan by Anika Lemaire, 1979.
- Réponses: the autobiography of Françoise Sagan, 1979.
- The Little Mermaids: a novel by Yves Dangerfield, 1979.
- Teachers, Writers, Celebrities: the intellectuals of modern France by Régis Debray, 1981.
- Matisse: Paper Cutouts, [text by] Jean Guichard-Meili, 1983.
- The Sculpture of Henri Matisse by Isabelle Monod-Fontaine, 1984.
- Colette: a passion for life by Geneviève Dormann, 1985.
- From Taylorism to Fordism: a rational madness by Bernard Doray, 1988.
- Democracy and Political Theory by Claude Lefort, 1988.
- (tr. and ed.) New Essays on Narcissism by Béla Grunberger, 1989.
- New Foundations for Psychoanalysis by Jean Laplanche, 1989.
- The Soviet Military System by Jacques Sapir, 1990
- Critique of Modernity by Alain Touraine, 1995.
- Automatic Discourse Analysis by Michel Pêcheux, ed. Tony Hak and Niels Helsloot, 1995.
- The Object of Literature by Pierre Macherey, 1995
- (tr. and ed.) Lacan: a critical reader by Jacques Lacan, 1995.
- What is Democracy? by Alain Touraine, 1997.
- Can We Live Together? Equality and difference by Alain Touraine, 2000.
- Society Must Be Defended: lectures at the Collège de France, 1975–76 by Michel Foucault, ed. Mauro Bertani and Alessandro Fontana, New York: Picador, 2003
- Suicide Bombers: Allah's New Martyrs by Farhad Khosrokhavar, 2005
- The Suffering of the Immigrant by Abdelmalek Sayad, with a preface by Pierre Bourdieu, 2007.
- Psychoanalysis: Its Image and its Public by Serge Moscovici, ed. with an introduction by Gerard Duveen, 2008.
- Suicide: The Hidden Side of Modernity by Christian Baudelot and Roger Establet, 2008.
- The Single Woman and the Fairy-Tale Prince by Jean-Claude Kauffmann, 2008.
- Resilience by Boris Cyrulnik, 2009.
- Violence by Michel Wieviorka, 2009.
- (tr. with Steve Corcoran) The communist hypothesis, 2010
- The Meaning of Cooking by Jean-Claude Kaufmann, 2010.
- The Curious History of Love by Jean-Claude Kaufmann, 2011
- Love Online by Jean-Claude Kaufmann, 2012
- Emile Durkheim: a biography by Marcel Fournier, 2013

=== Other works ===
- Lacan in Contexts, London: Verso Books, 1988.
- The Lives of Michel Foucault, London: Hutchinson, 1993; NY: Pantheon, 1993.
- Introduction to The Four Fundamental Concepts of Psycho-analysis by Jacques Lacan, tr. Alan Sheridan, Harmondsworth: Penguin, 1994.
- Frantz Fanon: A Life, London: Granta, 2000.
- The Penguin Dictionary of Critical Theory, London: Penguin, 2000.
