= François Dubet =

French sociologist (born 1946)

François Dubet (born 24 May 1946) is a French sociologist. He is the former director of studies at the School for Advanced Studies in the Social Sciences (EHESS). He was a professor at the University of Bordeaux-II until his retirement in 2013. He is the author of studies devoted to juvenile marginalization, schools and institutions. He led the development of the report "The College of the Year 2000" submitted to the Minister responsible for School Education in 1999, Ségolène Royal.

== Publications ==
- With Alain Touraine, Zsuza Hegedus and Michel Wieviorka, Touraine, Alain (November 1978). Lutte étudiante (in French). Paris: Seuil. ISBN 2-02-005007-2.
- With Alain Touraine, Zsuza Hegedus and Michel Wieviorka, Touraine, Alain (February 1980). La Prophétie anti-nucléaire (in French). Paris: Seuil. ISBN 2-02-005440-X.
- With Alain Touraine, Zsuza Hegedus and Michel Wieviorka, Touraine, Alain; Dubet, François (April 1981). Le Pays contre l'État: Luttes occitanes (in French). Paris: Seuil. ISBN 2-02-005833-2.
- With Alain Touraine, Michel Wieviorka et Jan Strzelecki, Touraine, Alain (April 1982). Solidarité (in French). Paris: Fayard. ISBN 2-213-01181-8.
- With Alain Touraine; Michel Wieviorka (February 1984). Le Mouvement ouvrier (in French). Paris: Fayard. ISBN 2-213-01361-6.
- With Adil Jazouli et Didier Lapeyronnie, Wieviorka, Michel (February 1985). L'État et les jeunes. Vol. 28. Les éditions ouvrières. pp. 218–219.
- Dubet, François (February 1987). La Galère: Jeunes en survie. Fayard. ISBN 978-2-213-01904-8.
- With Eugenio Tironi, Eduardo Valenzuela et Vicente Espinoza, Dubet, François (1989). Pobladores: Luttes sociales et démocratie au Chili. Éditions L'Harmattan. ISBN 2-7384-0208-9.
- With la collaboration de Catherine Flé, Immigrations, qu'en savons-nous ?: Un bilan des connaissances. la Documentation française. 1989.
- Dubet, François (April 1991). Les Lycéens (in French). Paris: Seuil. ISBN 2-02-013202-8.
- With Didier Lapeyronnie, Dubet, François; Lapeyronnie, Didier (September 1992). Les Quartiers d'exil (in French). Paris: Seuil. ISBN 2-02-014152-3.
- With Daniel Filâtre; François-Xavier Merrien (1994). Universités et villes (in French). La Défense/Paris: L'Harmattan. ISBN 2-7384-2697-2.
- Dubet, François (September 1994). Sociologie de l'expérience (in French). Paris: Le Seuil. ISBN 2-02-022869-6.
- With Danilo Martuccelli, Dubet, François; Martuccelli, Danilo (April 1996). À l'école: Sociologie de l'expérience scolaire (in French). Paris: Seuil. ISBN 2-02-028970-9.
- With Danilo Martuccelli, Dubet, François; Martuccelli, Danilo (March 1998). Dans quelle société vivons-nous ? (in French). Paris: Seuil. ISBN 2-02-032996-4.
- With Marie Duru-Bellat, Dubet, François; Duru-Bellat, Marie (August 2000). L'Hypocrisie scolaire: Pour un collège enfin démocratique (in French). Paris: Seuil. ISBN 2-02-040393-5.
- Entretien avec Philippe Petit, Dubet, François; Petit, Philippe (May 2001). Pourquoi changer l'école ? (in French). Paris: Textuel. ISBN 2-84597-025-0.
- Dubet, François (September 2002). Le Déclin de l'institution. Le Seuil. ISBN 2-02-055163-2.
- François Dubet (September 2003) [January 1997]. Écoles, familles: Le malentendu (in French). Paris: Textuel. ISBN 2-909317-29-3.
- With Claude Allègre et Philippe Meirieu, Allègre, Claude; Langevin, Paul; Dubet, François; Wallon, Henri; Meirieu, Philippe (January 2004). Pour l'école: Le rapport Langevin-Wallon (in French). Paris: Mille et une nuits. ISBN 2-84205-814-3.
- Dubet, François (August 2004) [2000]. Les Inégalités multipliées (in French). La Tour-d'Aigues: Éditions de l'Aube. ISBN 2-7526-0029-1.
- Dubet, François (September 2004). L'École des chances: Qu'est-ce qu'une école juste ? (in French). Paris: Le Seuil. ISBN 2-02-068579-5.
- With Valérie Caillet; Régis Cortéséro; David Mélo; Françoise Rault (March 2006). Injustices: L'expérience des inégalités au travail (in French). Paris: Seuil. ISBN 2-02-086378-2.
- Dubet, François (November 2007). L'expérience sociologique. La Découverte. ISBN 2-7071-5353-2.
- Dubet, François (August 2008). Faits d'école. éditions de l'EHESS. ISBN 2-7132-2166-8.
- Dubet, François (April 2009). Le travail des sociétés. Seuil. ISBN 978-2-02-099527-6.
- Dubet, François (February 2010). Les places et les chances: Repenser la justice sociale. Le Seuil. ISBN 2-02-101473-8.
- With Marie Duru-Bellat; Antoine Vérétout (August 2010). Les Sociétés et leurs écoles: Emprise du diplôme et cohésion sociale (27 August 2015, Points, coll. « Essais »). Seuil. ISBN 2-02-102009-6.
- Dubet, François (April 2011). À quoi sert vraiment un sociologue ? (in French). Paris: Armand Colin. ISBN 978-2-200-25767-5.
- Pierre Rosanvallon (November 2011). Faire société par le côté gauche. Seuil | Coédition Seuil-La République des idées. p. 77-90. ISBN 978-2-02-105431-6.
- With Olivier Cousin; Éric Macé; Sandrine Rui (February 2013). Pourquoi moi ?: L'expérience des discriminations. Le Seuil. ISBN 2-02-109741-2.
- Dubet, François (September 2014). La Préférence pour l'inégalité: Comprendre la crise des solidarités. République des Idées. ISBN 2-02-118622-9.
- Dubet, François (October 2016). Ce qui nous unit: Discriminations, égalité et reconnaissance. Le Seuil. ISBN 2-02-133186-5.
- With Joël Zaffran (June 2018). Trois Jeunesses: La révolte, la galère, l'émeute. Le Bord de l'eau. ISBN 2-35687-583-2.
- Dubet, François (March 2019). Le Temps des passions tristes: Inégalités et populisme. Le Seuil. ISBN 2-02-142034-5.
- With Marie Duru-Bellat, Dubet, François; Duru-Bellat, Marie (August 2020). L'école peut-elle sauver la démocratie?. Le Seuil. ISBN 978-2-02-145970-8.
