= Baubigny =

Baubigny is the name of several communes in France:

- Baubigny, Côte-d'Or, in the Côte-d'Or département
- Baubigny, Manche, in the Manche département
