= Severi =

Severi may refer to:

- Severi (surname), Italian surname
- Severan dynasty, dynasty of Roman emperors, ruling in the late 2nd and early 3rd century
- Severi (tribe), tribe that participated in the formation of the First Bulgarian Empire in the 7th century

== Finnish given name ==
- Severi Alanne (1879-1960), Finnish-American chemical engineer, dictionary compiler, socialist journalist, and consumers' co-operative organizer
- Severi Kaukiainen (born 1998), Finnish basketball player
- Severi Kähkönen (born 2000), Finnish footballer
- Severi Paajanen (born 1986), Finnish footballer
- Severi Sillanpää, Finnish ice hockey player
