= Severi (surname) =

Severi is an Italian surname.

== Geographical distribution ==
As of 2014, 80.4% of all known bearers of the surname Severi were residents of Italy (frequency 1:9,366), 3.3% of Brazil (1:763,105), 3.0% of France (1:272,572), 2.7% of Belgium (1:52,499), 2.1% of Argentina (1:247,072), 2.1% of the United States (1:2,125,008) and 2.0% of Uruguay (1:20,773).

In Italy, the frequency of the surname was higher than national average (1:9,366) in the following regions:

1. Emilia-Romagna (1:1,236)
2. Tuscany (1:3,075)
3. Umbria (1:3,596)
4. Marche (1:5,612)

== People ==
- Elisa Severi (1872–1930), Italian actress
- Francesco Severi (1879–1961), Italian mathematician
- Carlo Severi (born 1952), Italian anthropologist
