= Critique of Modernity =

1992 book by Alain Touraine

- Author: Alain Touraine
- Original title: Critique de la modernité
- Translator: David Macey
- Language: French
- Subject: Modernity
- Publisher: Fayard
- Publication date: 23 September 1992
- Publication place: France
- English publication date: 1995
- Media type: Print (Hardcover and Paperback)
- Pages: 462 (first edition)

Critique of Modernity (French: Critique de la modernité) is a 1992 book by the French sociologist Alain Touraine. It attempts to offer a critique of modernity which is neither antimodern nor postmodern, but proposes a rebuilt modernity based on the subject's liberation.

== Summary ==
Touraine describes how a modernity based on the idea of reason has been questioned by various parties. Its purported universalism has been criticized for how its elite has been unable to recognize the particular experiences of groups such as the working class, the colonized, women and children. Touraine recognizes this as a problem, but rejects the acceptance of human diversity as a solution, because accepting difference would also be to accept intolerance and conflict. He also rejects postmodernism, which he simply views as an exhaustion of the same modernity.

Touraine proposes a rebuilt modernity. Instead of the dualist modernity of René Descartes and the Declaration of the Rights of Man and of the Citizen, which has been destroyed by Friedrich Nietzsche, Sigmund Freud, consumerism and nationalism, Touraine wants to base modernity on the subject's struggle for freedom. This includes the individual's as well as the group's will to control their own lives, in opposition to the logic of market forces and power. Touraine's preferred modernity therefore recognizes the need for memory and belonging, which becomes part of a correspondence with reason and the subject's liberation.

== Reception ==
Pierre Muller argued that the book lacks the necessary keys to understand the relationship between the subject-individual and the collective actor, which is crucial for the proposed new forms of mediation, as well as for any issues concerning exclusion and citizenship. Still, Muller found the book "extremely stimulating" for its "original contribution to the current debate on the crisis of political mediation and, more generally, on the place of the individual in sociological analysis", although it "opens more doors than it offers answers".

Barry Cooper wrote that Touraine was a "master of the genre" of deconstruction, but that "those who are puzzled by opacity of argumentation and bored by repetitive, allusive language bursting with metaphors may wish not to devote their time to his text". Cooper thought the book led to a "dead end" which could have been used to "question the modern premises of modernity, to recall that modernity was in its genesis a rejection of something not modern", although this would collide with the author's historicist approach. Cooper wrote that "Touraine has provided political philosophers with a symptom of the disorders they are called upon to analyze". Peter Beilharz described the book as "a kind of summary of a life's work" and "arguably longer than it needs to be", and wrote that What Is Democracy? and Can We Live Together? possibly are better titles to start with for readers who are new to Touraine's work.
