= The Lives of Michel Foucault =

1993 book by David Macey

- Author: David Macey
- Subject: Biography
- Publisher: Pantheon Books
- Publication date: 1993
- Pages: 599

The Lives of Michel Foucault is a 1993 biography of French philosopher Michel Foucault by David Macey.

== Bibliography ==
- Collins, Stephen L. (1994). "Review of The Passion of Michel Foucault; The Lives of Michel Foucault: A Biography". The American Historical Review. 99 (2): 507–510. doi:10.2307/2167289. ISSN 0002-8762. JSTOR 2167289.
- Heroux, Erick (1994). "Review of The Lives of Michel Foucault". SubStance. 23 (3): 133–136. doi:10.2307/3685376. ISSN 0049-2426. JSTOR 3685376.
- Martin, Luther H. (1995). "The discourse of (Michel Foucault's) life: A review essay". Method & Theory in the Study of Religion. 7 (1): 57–69. doi:10.1163/157006895X00216. ISSN 0943-3058. JSTOR 23555529.
- Rawson, Claude (1994). "The Masks of M. Foucault". The Sewanee Review. 102 (3): 471–476. ISSN 0037-3052. JSTOR 27546898.
- Silver, Daniel J. (1995). "Self-Starter". The American Scholar. 64 (1): 124–131. ISSN 0003-0937. JSTOR 41212296.
