= Margaret Atack =

Scholar of French literature and academic

- Born: Leicester, Leicestershire, England
- Died: 13 December 2023
- Spouse: David Macey
- Awards: University of Leeds award for inspirational teaching 2015

Academic background
- Education: St Mary's School, Shaftesbury
- Alma mater: University College London

Academic work
- Discipline: French literature
- Sub-discipline: Second World War, French post-war feminisms
- Institutions: University of Leeds, Sunderland Polytechnic

Margaret Atack (died 13 December 2023) was a British scholar of French literature, with a focus on the Second World War and on French post-war feminisms.

== Early life ==
Born in Leicester, England, Atack moved frequently with her family before settling in Liverpool in the late 1960s. She attended St Mary's School, Shaftesbury, a Catholic boarding school, before earning a first-class degree in French at University College London (UCL) in 1971. Her grandfather fought in France during World War I.

== Career ==
Atack completed her PhD and began teaching at UCL, later holding posts at Southampton and Cardiff universities. She joined the University of Leeds in 1979, where she served in various leadership roles, including professor, head of French, dean of arts, and pro-vice-chancellor for research. She also led humanities and social studies at Sunderland Polytechnic from 1989 to 1993, before returning to Leeds. She was awarded the University of Leeds award for inspirational teaching in 2015.

She was an authority on French literature about the Resistance and the Occupation and was an early member of Women in French UK. Her 1989 book Literature and the French Resistance remains influential. She also co-edited three books and wrote a number of articles on feminism in post-war France. In 2019, she edited 'Making Waves: French Feminisms and Their Legacies'. Her 2020 monograph, Jean-François Vilar: Theatres of Crime, examined the French political crime writer Jean-François Vilar.

== Later life ==
Atack partially retired in 2016. She fully retired in 2022 due to ill health. She died of cancer on 13 December 2023, aged 75.

Margaret met her partner, the translator and historian David Macey (d. 2011), when she was a student. They adopted three children. Margaret was survived by her children, six grandchildren and her brother.

In 2024, the "Occupation and Resistance, Crime Fiction and Memory. A day symposium in honour of Margaret Atack" was held at the Institute of Languages, Cultures and Societies, University of London in her memory, supported by the University of London’s Cassal Fund and the Society for French Studies.

== Selected bibliography ==
- Literature and the French Resistance: Cultural Politics and Narrative Forms 1940–1950. Manchester: Manchester University Press, 1989.
- Contemporary French fiction by women: feminist perspectives. Manchester: Manchester University Press. 1990. ISBN 978-0-7190-3084-0.
- May 68 in French Fiction and Film: Rethinking Representation, Rethinking Society (1991)
- Collier, Peter; Atack, Margaret; Fell, Alison S.; Holmes, Diana; Long, Imogen (30 November 2017). French Feminisms 1975 and After. Oxford; New York: Peter Lang Limited, International Academic Publishers. ISBN 978-3-0343-2209-6.
- Atack, Margaret; Fell, Alison S.; Holmes, Diana; Long, Imogen (11 December 2019). Making Waves. Liverpool: Liverpool University Press. ISBN 978-1-78962-455-7.
- Jean-François Vilar: Theatres of Crime. Cambridge: Legenda, 2020.
