= Serge Dufoulon =

French academic and sociologist (1956–2022)

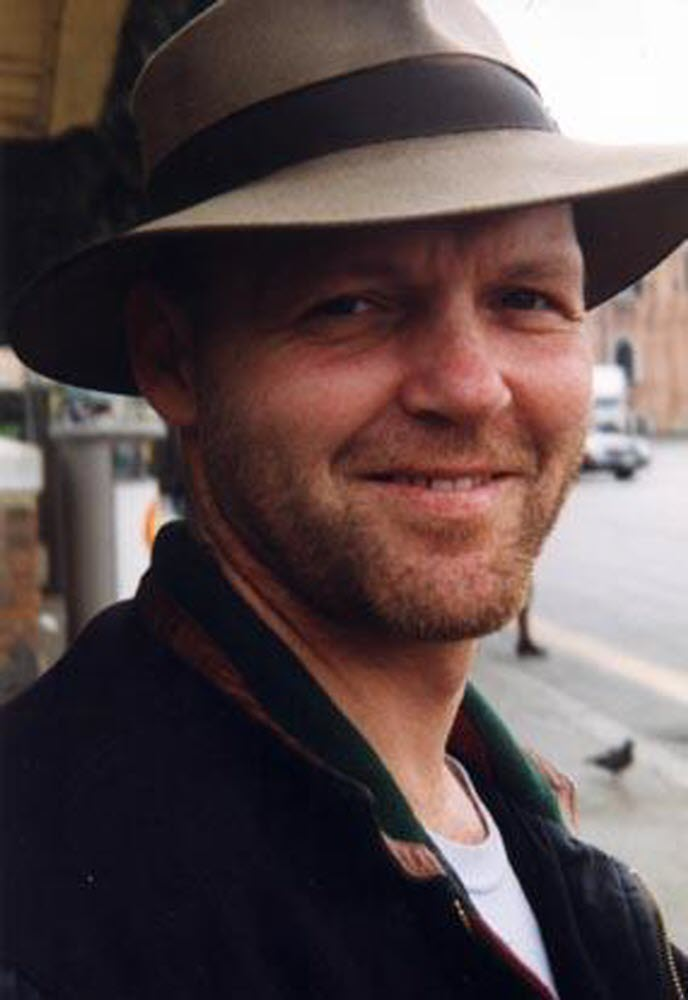
- Born: 15 April 1956; Tunis, Tunisia
- Died: 30 October 2022 (aged 66)
- Education: Lumière University Lyon 2 University of the Mediterranean; School for Advanced Studies in the Social Sciences; University of Provence
- Occupations: Professor; Sociologist

Serge Dufoulon (15 April 1956 – 30 October 2022) was a French post-modern sociologist. He was also a blogger and former columnist on the RMC program Les Grandes Gueules. He primarily carried out research on the sociology of work, as well as immigration and the environment.

== Biography ==
Dufoulon earned a master's degree in rural sociology and a certificate in political science from the University of Provence and the University of the Mediterranean, respectively. After passing his Master of Advanced Studies at the School for Advanced Studies in the Social Sciences under the direction of Georges Condominas, he earned a doctorate in sociology and social sciences from Lumière University Lyon 2 in 1995.

Dufoulon became a professor of sociology and anthropology and chaired the sociology department at Pierre Mendès-France University. He was also an expert with AERES. He served as a columnist on the RMC show Les Grandes Gueules in 2012.

Serge Dufoulon died on 30 October 2022, at the age of 66.

=== Controversies ===
In 2016, Dufoulon was accused of making "inappropriate remarks" to three students during master's courses in sociology at Grenoble Alpes University, commenting "you see, the problem with you is that nobody wants to fuck you" and making other remarks on the physique of female students. He was sanctioned in January 2017 by the section disciplinaire du conseil académique of Grenoble Alpes University, which suspended him for eight months. After an appeal, he was acquitted by the Conseil national de l'enseignement supérieur et de la recherche (CNESER) on 10 July 2018, which stated that "the words and tone used did not exceed the limits of academic freedom".

Following an open letter signed by the Association française de sociologie and the Collectif de lutte anti-sexiste contre le harcèlement sexuel dans l'enseignement supérieur, the university announced that they would appeal the CNESER decision to the Council of State. Dufoulon's lawyer "received a mandate to file a complaint for slanderous denunciation, against the signatories of the open letter who have a truncated and ideological vision" and announced that he was considering filing a complaint against the university for harassment. According to Place Gre’net, "the 'dissident' sociologists of Lestamp have asserted their support for the professor" in part by reproducing a blog post made on Dufoulon's Mediapart account.

Dufoulon submitted two appeals to the administrative court of Grenoble, considering himself a victim of moral harassment by the university. His appeals were dismissed.

== Publications ==
- Femmes de parole. Une ethnologie de la voyance (1997)
- Les gars de la marine. Ethnologie d'un navire de guerre (1998)
- Métissages (2001)
- Sociologie du milieu militaire (2005)
- Religious Frontiers of Europe, Eurolimes, Journal of the Institute for Eurogional Studies (2007)
- Développement durable : Analyse sociologique de la domestication de l’environnement (2009)
- Migrations, Mobilités, Frontières et Voisinages (2011)
- Internet ou la boîte à usages (2012)
- Europe partagée, Europe des partages (2013)
- Itinéraire d'une grande gueule. Du Bled à l'Université (2015)
- Les relations familiales dans les écritures de l'intime du XIXe français (2016)
