= Baubigny, Côte-d'Or =

Baubigny
- Commune
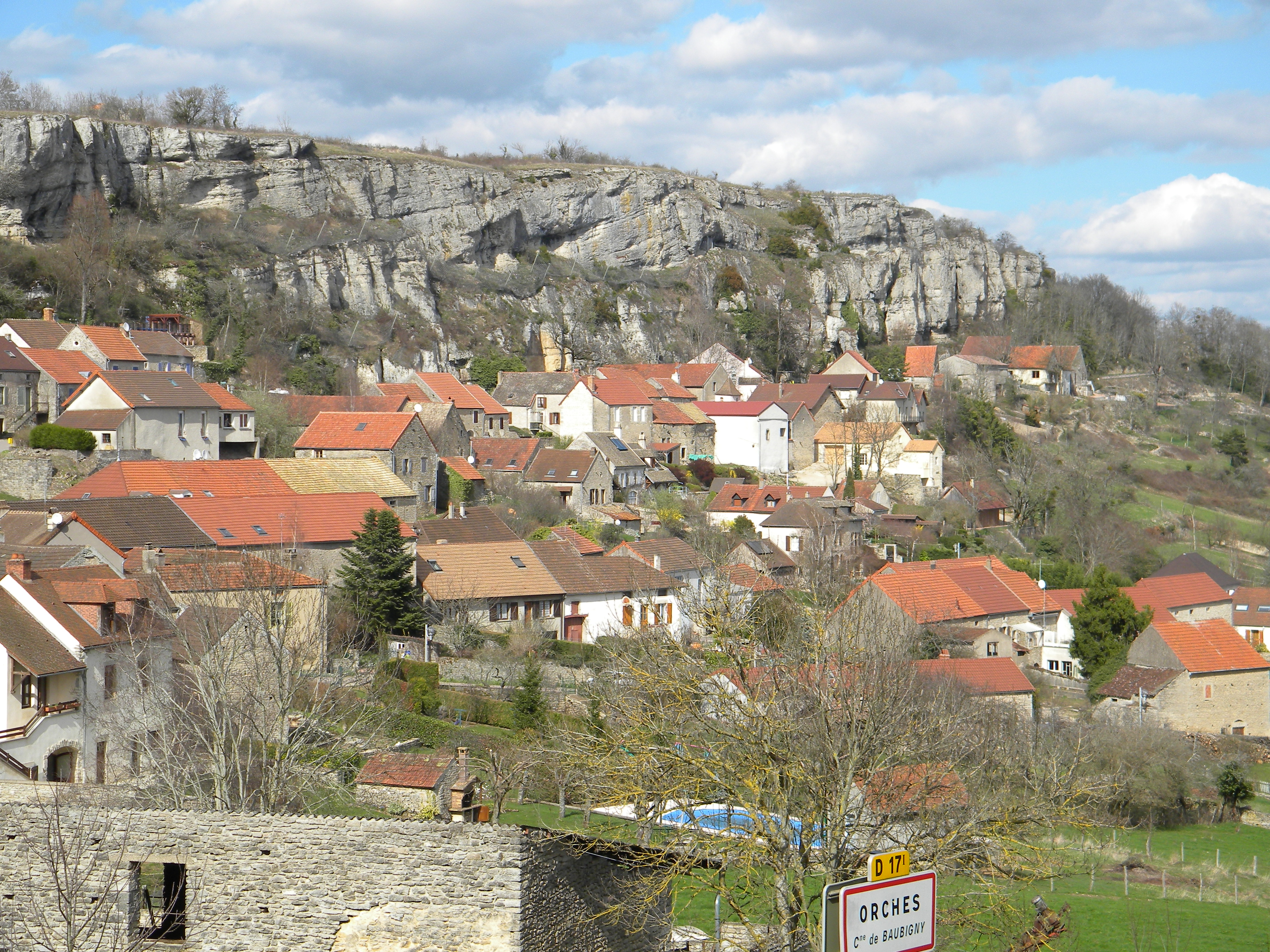
- The hamlet of Orches in the commune

- Coat of arms
- Location of Baubigny
- Location within France Location within Bourgogne-Franche-Comté
- Coordinates: 46°58′37″N 4°41′20″E
- Country: France
- Region: Bourgogne-Franche-Comté
- Department: Côte-d'Or
- Arrondissement: Beaune
- Canton: Arnay-le-Duc
- Intercommunality: CA Beaune Côte et Sud

Government
  - Mayor (2020–2026): Rémy Morin
- Area^{1}: 10.31 km^{2} (3.98 sq mi)
- Highest elevation: 566 m (1,857 ft)
- Lowest elevation: 313 m (1,027 ft)
- Population (2023): 210
  - Density: 20/km^{2} (53/sq mi)
- Time zone: UTC+01:00 (CET)
  - Summer (DST): UTC+02:00 (CEST)
- INSEE/Postal code: 21050 /21340
- ^{1} French Land Register data, which excludes lakes, ponds, glaciers > 1 km^{2} (0.386 sq mi or 247 acres) and river estuaries.

Baubigny (French pronunciation: [bobiɲi]) is a commune in the Côte-d'Or department in the Bourgogne-Franche-Comté region of eastern France.

== Geography ==
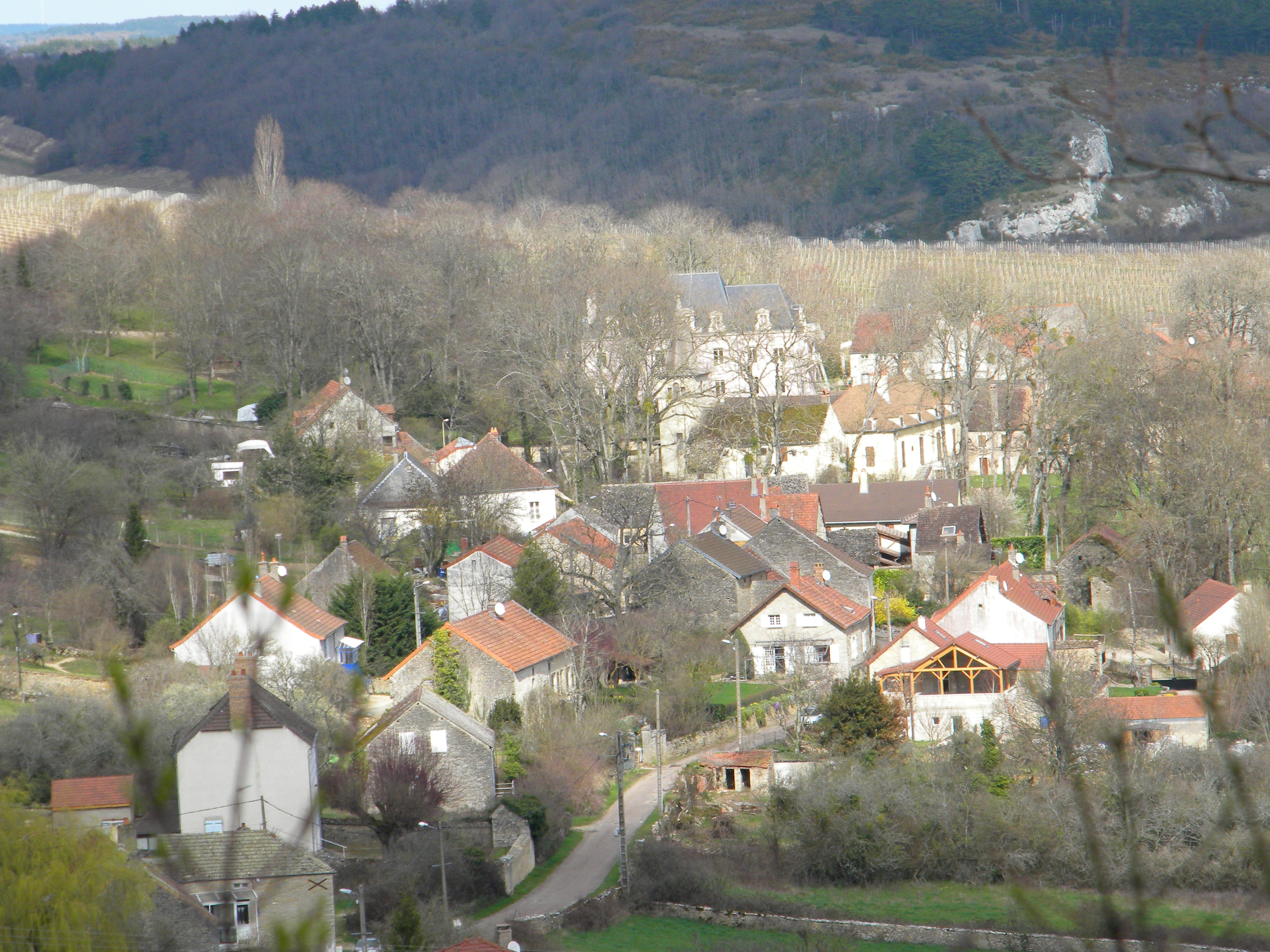
Evelle

Baubigny is located some 12 km south-west of Beaune and 8 km north-east of Chagny. Access to the commune is by the D111D from La Rochepot in the south which goes to the village then continues east to join the D973 on the eastern border of the commune. The D906 passes along the western border and the north of the commune as it goes from Saint-Aubin to Ivry-en-Montagne. The D171 goes north from the village to join the D17 just north-east of the commune. Apart from the village there are the hamlets of Évelle and Orches. The commune is almost all farmland with a few patches of forest.

The Ruisseau des Cloux flows north-east through the south-eastern corner of the commune and continues to join the Dheune south of Merceuil.

== Toponymy ==
Baubigny appears as Baubigny on the 1750 Cassini Map and the same on the 1790 version.

=== Heraldry ===
Arms of Baubigny	Blazon: Azure, a fess of Or surmounted by 3 roundels the same in fess; in base a fer de moline the same.

== Administration ==
List of Successive Mayors

From	To	Name
2001	2006	Jean Paul Lacour
2006	2020	Patrick Manière
2020	2026	Rémy Morin

== Demography ==
The inhabitants of the commune are known as Balbiniacois or Balbiniacoises in French.

Historical population

Year	Pop.	±% p.a.
1793	461	—
1821	619	+1.06%
1846	653	+0.21%
1872	573	−0.50%
1901	490	−0.54%
1926	265	−2.43%
1946	204	−1.30%
1962	180	−0.78%
1968	198	+1.60%

Year	Pop.	±% p.a.
1975	164	−2.66%
1982	202	+3.02%
1990	221	+1.13%
1999	252	+1.47%
2007	268	+0.77%
2012	214	−4.40%
2017	202	−1.15%
2023	210	+0.65%

Source: EHESS and INSEE

== Culture and heritage ==
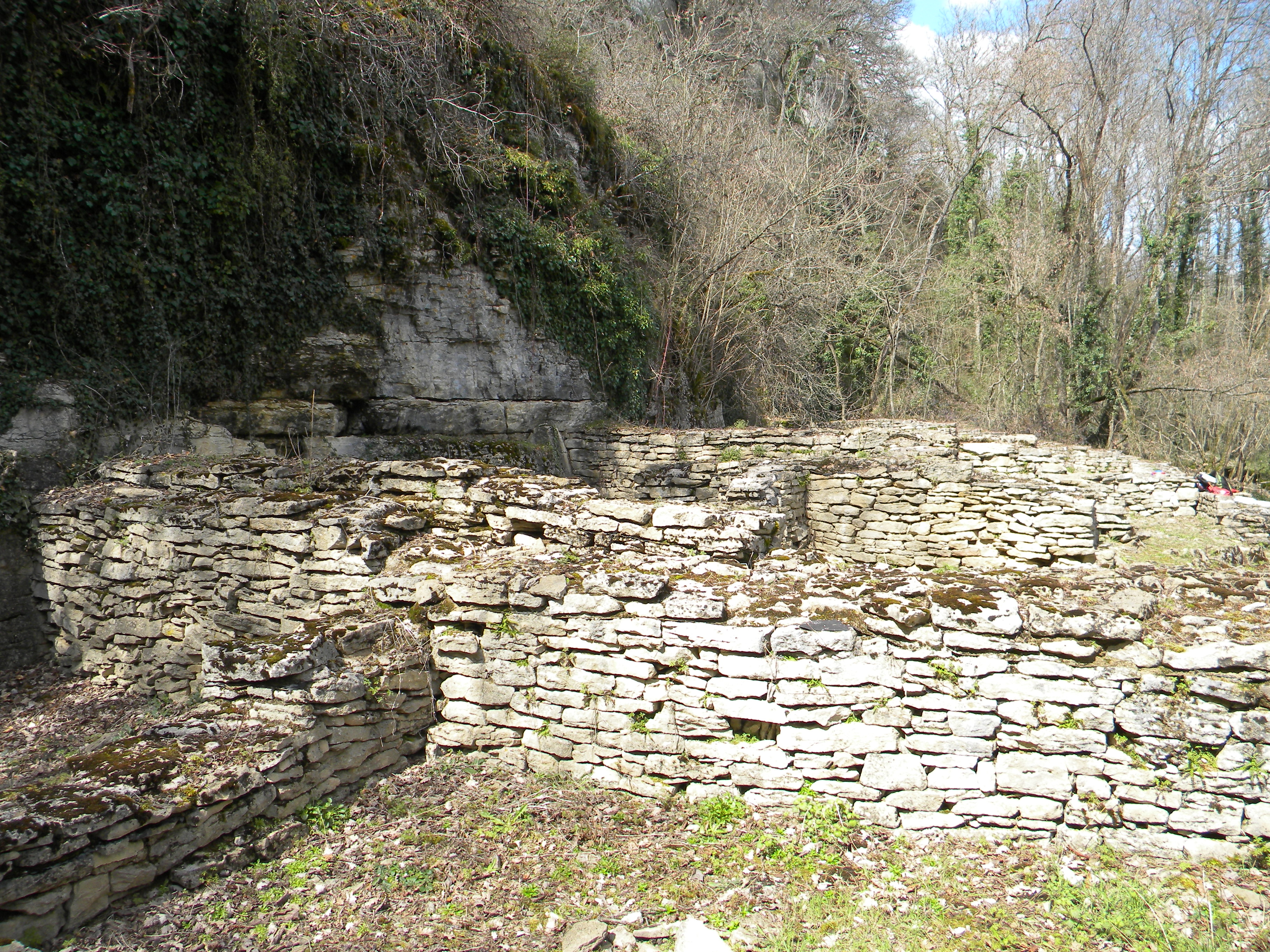
The excavation at Dracy

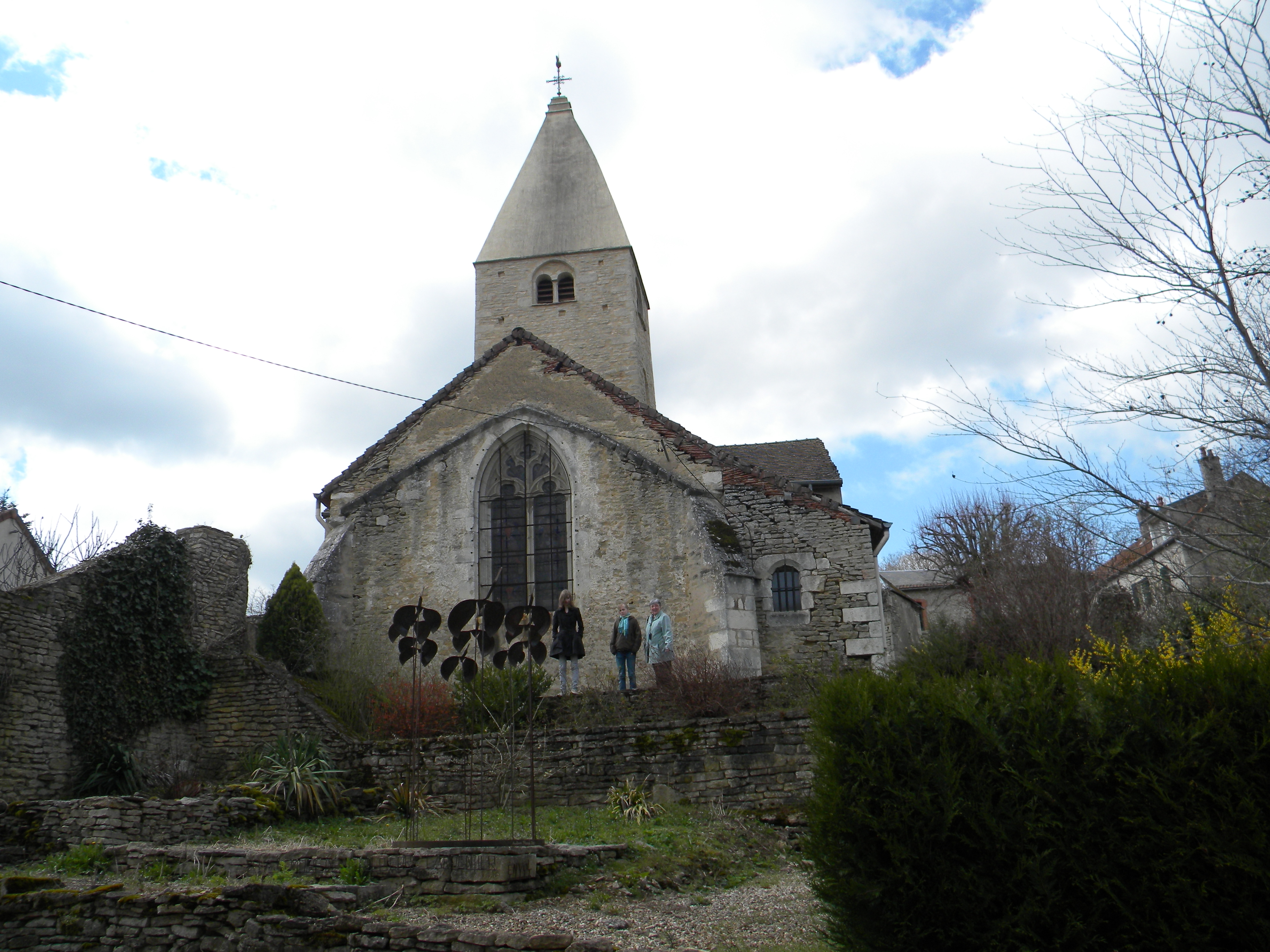
The Parish Church

=== Civil heritage ===
- The medieval village of Dracy, excavated by Jean-Marie Pesez, Françoise Piponnier, and students of the Ecole pratique des hautes etudes (EPHE), has led to numerous publications that have made it a known site for medieval archaeology.

The commune has a number of buildings and sites that are registered as historical monuments:

- A House at Evelle (16th century)
- A House at Evelle (19th century)
- A House at Evelle (1777)
- A House at Evelle (18th century)
- A Winemaker's House at Rue d'Eschailley Evelle (18th century)
- A House at Goulot de Jalant Orches (17th century)
- A Winemaker's House at Rue du Lavoir Orches (16th century)
- A Fountain at Orches (18th century)
- A Lavoir (Public laundry) (19th century)
- The Fountain au Chêne at Orches (19th century)
- A Winemaker's Manor House at Evelle (18th century)
- A Houses and Farms (15th-19th century)

=== Religious heritage ===
The commune has many religious buildings and sites that are registered as historical monuments:

- A Wayside Cross (north-east) (1815)
- A Wayside Cross (north) (1860)
- A Cemetery Cross (1895)
- A Wayside Cross (north-east of Orches) (19th century)
- A Wayside Cross (north-west) (19th century)
- A Cemetery Cross (1880)
- The Croix du Pèlerin wayside cross (19th century)
- The Chapel Saint-Marc (15th century)
- The Croix de Choux wayside cross (19th century)
- 8 Monumental Crosses (19th century)
- The Chapel Saint-Abdon (18th century)
- The Parish Church of Saint Léger (12th century)

The Church and chapels contain a large number of items that are registered as historical objects. In total, including civil heritage, there are over 50 historical objects in the commune.

== Notable people linked to the commune ==
- Théodore Monod (1902-2000), scientific naturalist, explorer, scholar and French humanist. From 1980 to 1999 he came to Baubigny every year. The Foyer Rural was funded by Théodore-Monod. There is also a Théodore-Monod footpath.
- Léon Fichot, champion cyclist, was born in Baubigny on 12 October 1906.

== See also ==
- Communes of the Côte-d'Or department
