= School for Advanced Studies in the Social Sciences =

French higher education institution in Paris

Coordinates: 48°51′0.86″N 2°19′36.33″E

The School for Advanced Studies in the Social Sciences
- École des hautes études en sciences sociales
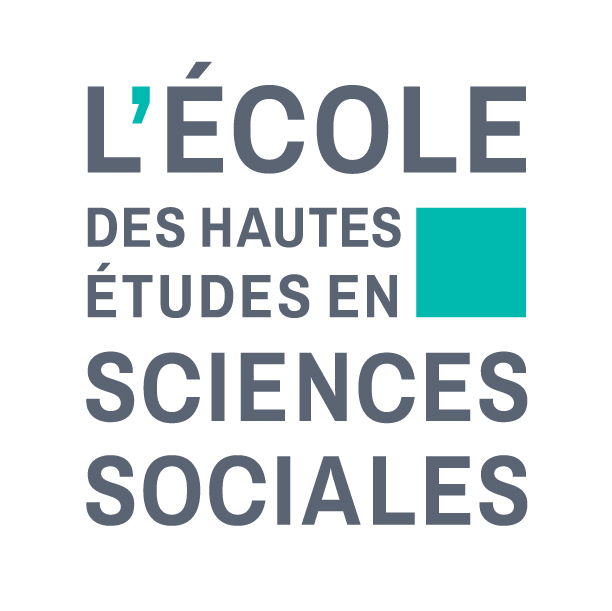
- Other name: EHESS
- Former names: École libre des hautes études (1941–1946); École pratique des hautes études, VIe Section (1947–1975)
- Type: Grand établissement EPCSCP
- Established: 23 January 1975; 51 years ago
- Budget: €60 million
- President: Romain Huret
- Faculty: 830
- Administrative staff: 450
- Students: 3,000
- Location: Paris, Marseille, Toulouse, Lyon, France
- Campus: Urban
- Website: ehess.fr

The School for Advanced Studies in the Social Sciences (French: École des hautes études en sciences sociales, EHESS) is a graduate grande école and grand établissement in Paris focused on academic research in the social sciences. The school awards Master and PhD degrees alone and conjointly with the grandes écoles École normale supérieure, École polytechnique, and École pratique des hautes études.

Originally a department (VIe Section or Section VI) of the École pratique des hautes études, created in 1868 with the purpose of training academic researchers, the EHESS became an independent institution in 1975. Today its research covers social sciences, humanities, and applied mathematics. Degrees and research in economics and finance are awarded through the Paris School of Economics.

The EHESS, in common with other grandes écoles, is a small school with very strict entry criteria, and admits students through a rigorous selection process based on applicants' research projects. Scholars in training are subsequently free to choose their own curriculum amongst the School's fields of research. The école has a small student-faculty ratio; 830 researchers for 3,000 students (27.6%).

Most of the School's faculty belong to other institutions, mostly within the French National Centre for Scientific Research and schools affiliated with PSL University. The School's alumni and faculty include sociologists Pierre Bourdieu, philosophers Jacques Derrida and Catherine Malabou, film theorist Christian Metz, and economist Thomas Piketty.

== History ==
=== École pratique des hautes études ===
Originally part of the École pratique des hautes études (EPHE) as its "VIe Section: Sciences économiques et sociales", the EHESS gained autonomy as an independent higher education institution on 23 January 1975. The creation of a dedicated branch for social science research within the EPHE was catalyzed by the Annales historical school and was supported by several academic initiatives of the Rockefeller Foundation, dating to the 1920s. After WWII, the Rockefeller Foundation invested more funds in French institutions, seeking to encourage non-Marxist sociological studies.

The VIe Section was created in 1947, and Lucien Febvre took its head. Soon after its creation (1947), the VIe Section, later EHESS, became one of the most influential shapers of contemporary historiography, area studies and social sciences methodology, thanks to the contribution of eminent scholars such as Fernand Braudel, Jacques Le Goff and François Furet. F. Braudel succeeded L. Febvre in 1956. He concentrated the various study groups at the well-known building on boulevard Raspail (area of allée Claude-Cahun-Marcel-Moore), in part by financing from the Ford Foundation.

=== Independent institution ===
Today, the EHESS is one of France's Grands établissements. It functions as a research, teaching, and degree-granting institution. It offers advanced students high-level programs intended to lead to research careers. Students are admitted on the relevance of their research project and undertake at the EHESS master programs and doctoral studies. The main areas of specialization include: history, literary theory, linguistics, philosophy, philology, sociology, anthropology, economics, cognitive science, demographics, geography, archaeology, psychology, law, and mathematics. The institution's focus is on interdisciplinary research within these fields. The EHESS has more than 40 research centers (among which are several joint research units with the CNRS) and 22 doctoral programs, 13 of which are in partnership with other French Universities and Grandes écoles.

== Research ==
=== History ===
==== Influence from the Annales School ====
Lucien Febvre and Fernand Braudel were members of the École des Annales, the dominant school of historical analysis in France during the interwar period. However, this school of thought was contested by the growing importance of the social sciences and the beginning of structuralism. Under pressure from Claude Lévi-Strauss, in particular, they integrated new contributions from the fields of sociology and ethnography to event-based historical analysis, a concept put forward by the Annales school, to advocate for the concept of "a nearly imperceptible passage of history". They were reproached, along with the structuralists, for ignoring politics and the individual's influence over his fate during a period in which the colonial wars of liberation were taking place.

The work of Braudel, Le Roy Ladurie and other historians working under their influence greatly affected the research and official teaching of history in France beginning in the 1960s. The work of Jean-Marie Pesez renewed interest in the issue of methodology in medieval archeology and created the idea of "material culture". François Hartog, who serves as the director of the school's ancient and modern historiography department, is also noted for proposing that the problems of modern time schema are not entirely caused by an imperialist past. He is also known for challenging the Eurocentric reflection of history and the present.

==== New History ====
During the 1970s, EHESS became the center of New History under the influence of Jacques Le Goff and Pierre Nora. During this period, a generation of ethnologists working under the ideas of Georges Balandier and Marc Augé were critical of the French colonial tradition and applied modern sociological concepts to third world countries.

==== New Polish School of Holocaust Scholarship ====
In 2019, held the New Polish School of Holocaust Scholarship conference. The conference was disrupted by Polish nationalists. EHESS President, Christophe Prochasson, said he could not recall such a violent disturbance at any scientific conference. Minister Frédérique Vidal condemned Polish authorities.

=== Sociology ===
Pierre Bourdieu, Luc Boltanski, Alain Touraine, Jean-Claude Passeron have all been associated with EHESS.

=== Economics ===
EHESS has always been a central place for economic debate in Europe. In France this debate is also enabled by the proximity of the researchers in Paris with national economic institutions: In this sense EHESS's advisors who have been drawn from economic professors have enjoyed a large media audience (one notable example was Jean Fourastié). The diversity of viewpoints has been a priority, and liberal and Marxist economists have had the chance to debate in EHESS. Since the 1970s and 1980s EHESS has focused on quantitative economics, with classes led by well-known professors such as Louis-André Gérard-Varet, Jean-Jacques Laffont, François Bourguignon and Roger Guesnerie. They initiated not only the Paris School of Economics but the Toulouse School of Economics and Grequam (Aix-Marseille).

== Domestic and foreign networks ==
=== Affiliations ===
The school is a founding member of the Paris School of Economics, Toulouse School of Economics, and Aix-Marseille School of Economics, the three French leading centers in Quantitative Economics. Since 2014 it is an associated member of the Paris Research University (PSL).

=== International partnerships ===
EHESS has exchange programs with universities such as Oxford and Cambridge in the United Kingdom; Columbia, Yale, University of California, and University of Michigan in the United States; Heidelberg in Germany; Tokyo and Kyoto in Japan; Peking University in China; and the European University Institute in Florence, Italy. It also has exchange programs with universities in Asia and the Middle-East, and holds research centers on Asian Studies and Islamic Studies.

== Notable alumni ==
- Marwan Bishara
- Sandra Boehringer
- Françoise Briand
- Manuel Carvalheiro
- Antonio Casilli
- Yves Censi
- Philippe Corcuff
- Julien Coupat
- Louis Chauvel
- Jacqueline Clarac de Briceño
- Louis Dumont
- Robert Delort
- Božidar Đelić
- Mamadou Diawara
- Albert Doja
- Esther Duflo
- Serge Dufoulon
- Safi Faye
- Caroline Fourest
- Susan George
- Mélanie Gourarier
- Alicia Gutiérrez
- Béatrice Hibou
- Jean Hyppolite
- Marc Lazar
- Frédéric Lordon
- Édouard Louis
- Caterina Magni
- Alain Marleix
- Frédéric Martel
- Walter Mignolo
- Laure Murat
- Sébastien Nadot
- Guadalupe Nettel
- Christine Niederberger Betton
- Laurent Nunez
- Thomas Pavel
- Thomas Piketty
- Guy Poitevin
- Ignacio Ramonet
- Joseph Gaï Ramaka
- Bernard Salanié
- Cheick Oumar Sissoko
- Bernard Stiegler
- David Thesmar
- Alain Touraine
- Nicolas Trifon
- Olivier Weber
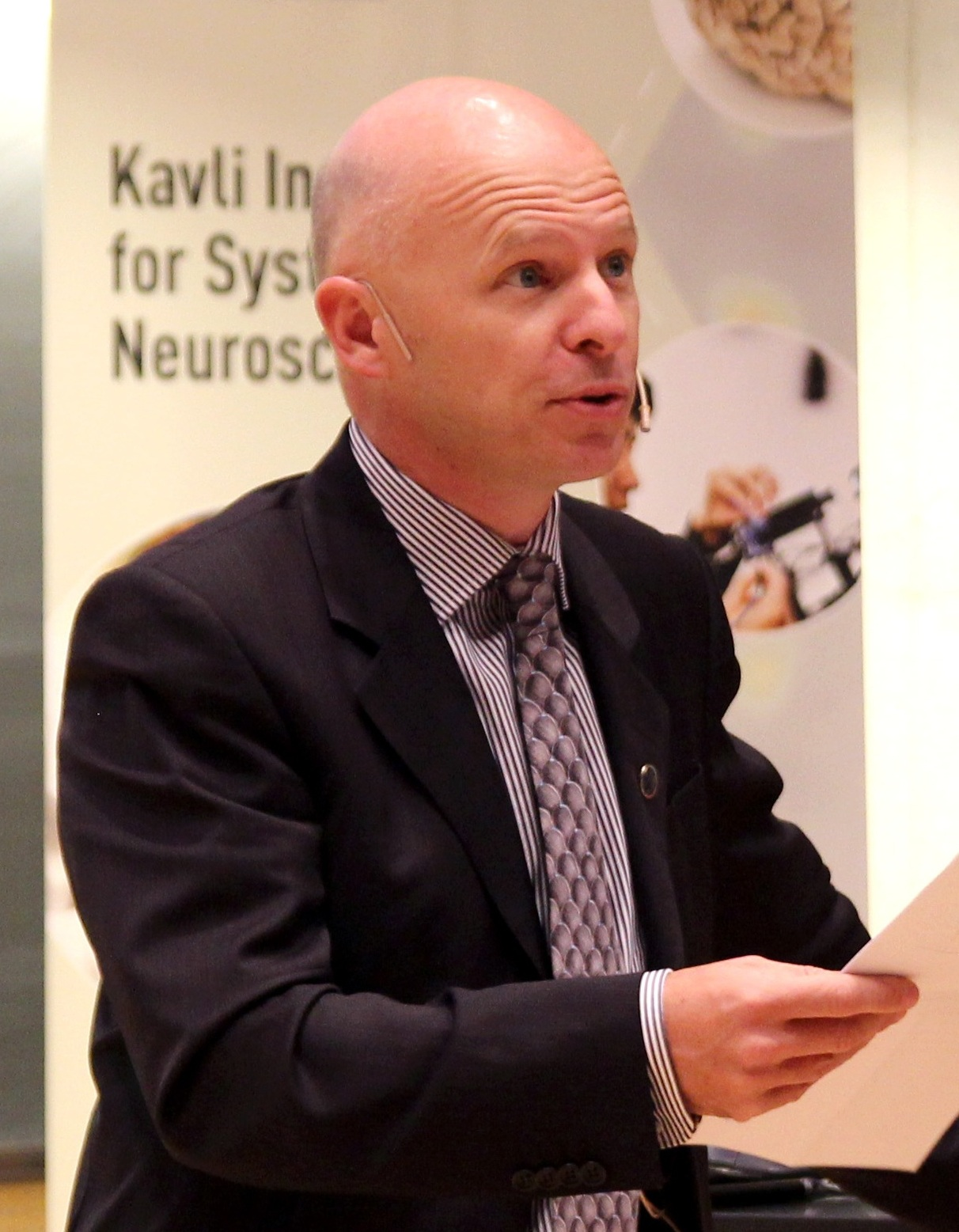
Stanislas Dehaene

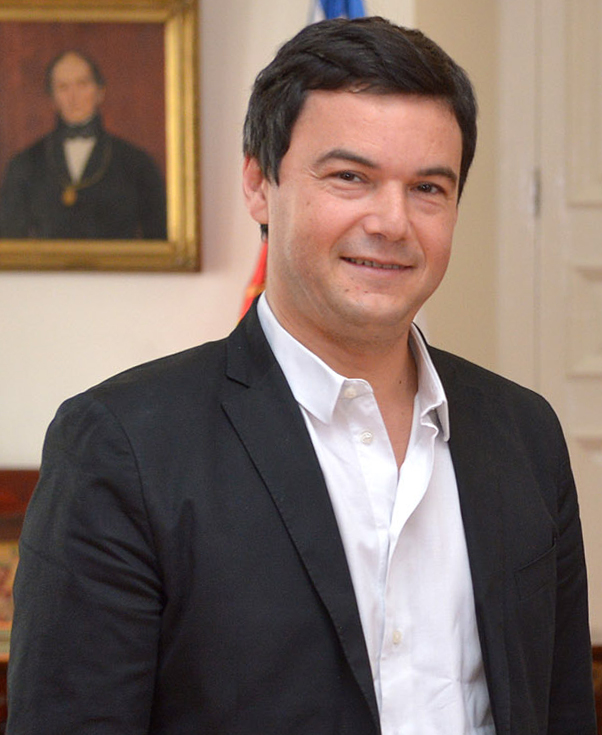
Thomas Piketty

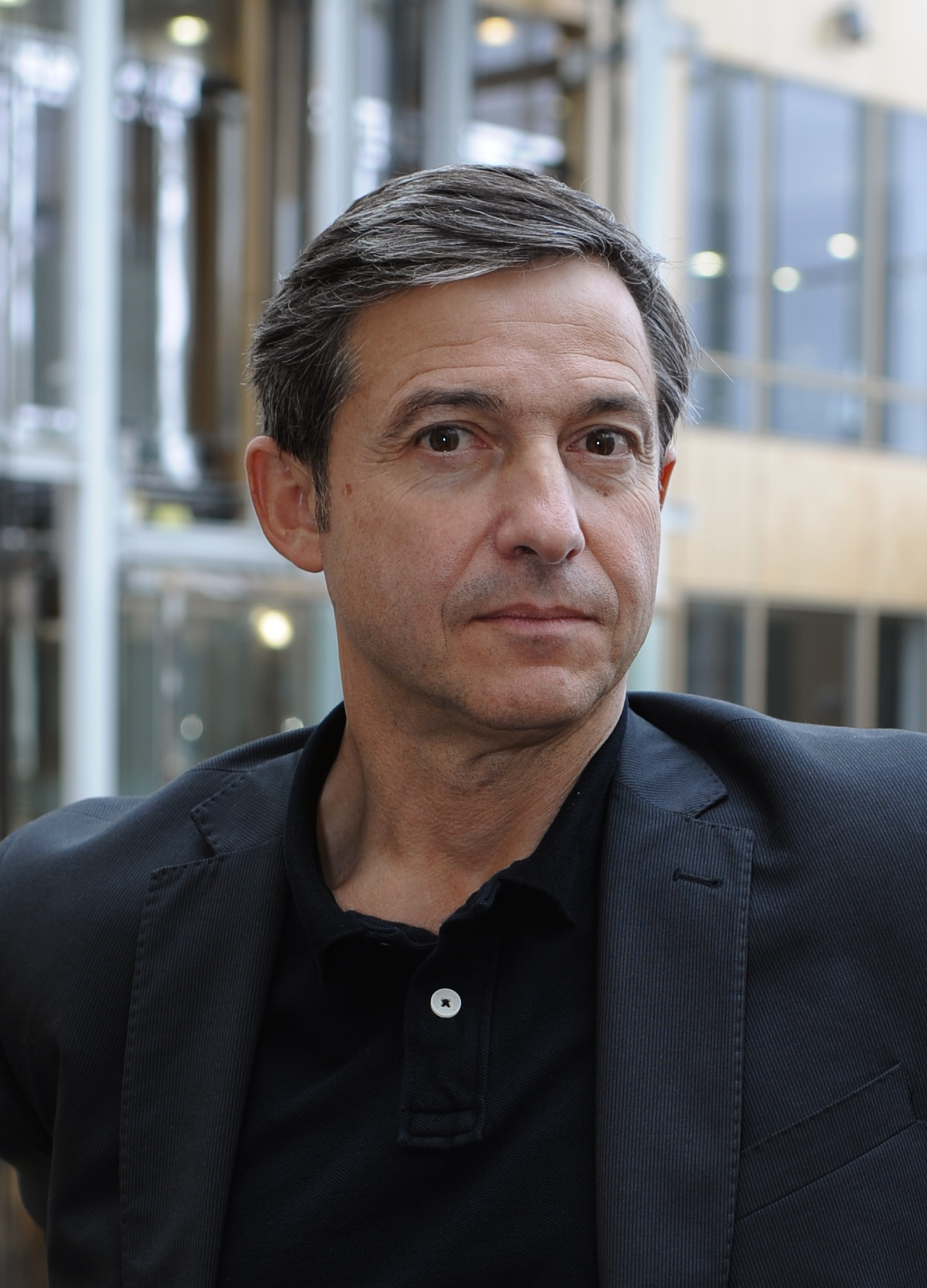
Didier Fassin

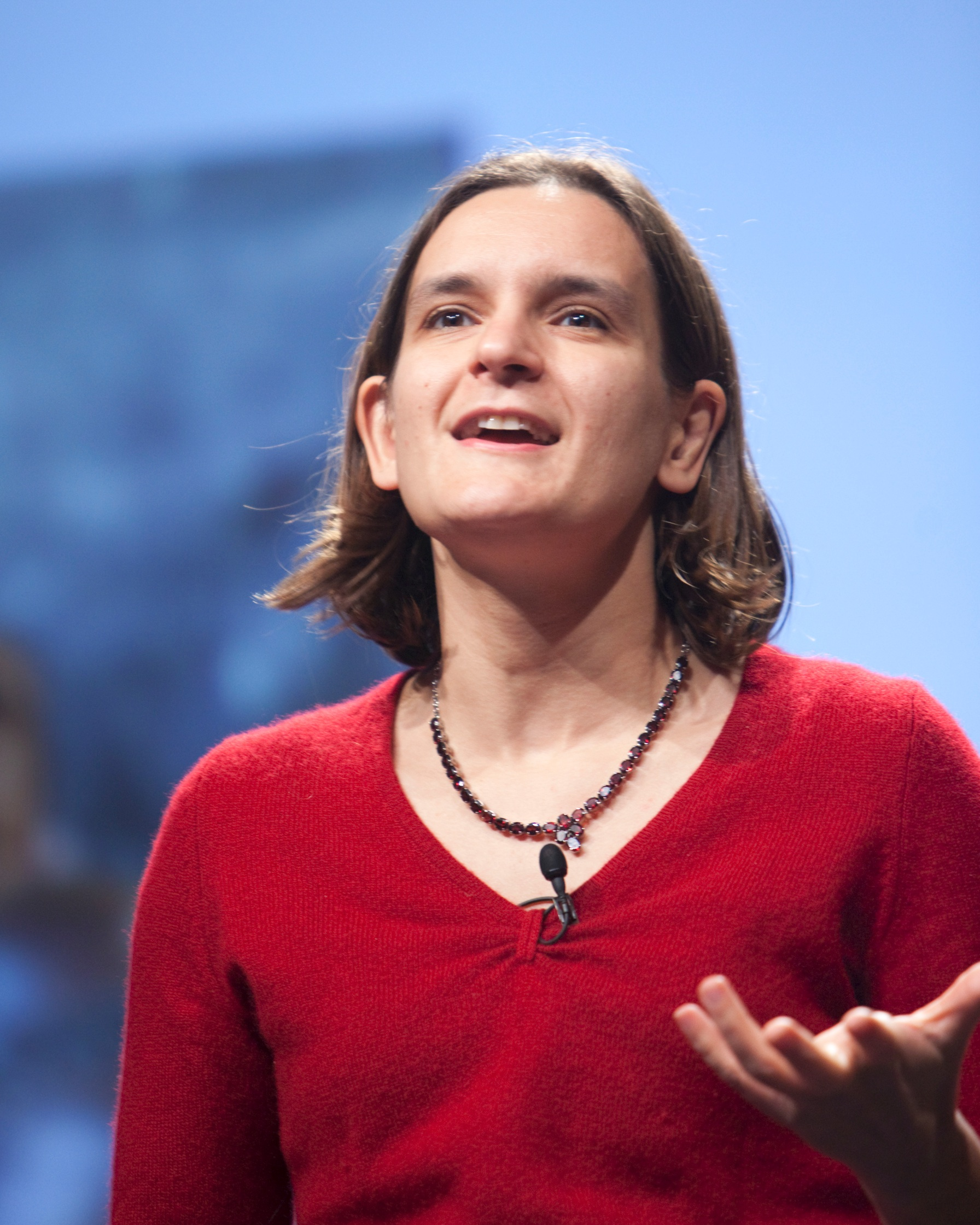
Esther Duflo

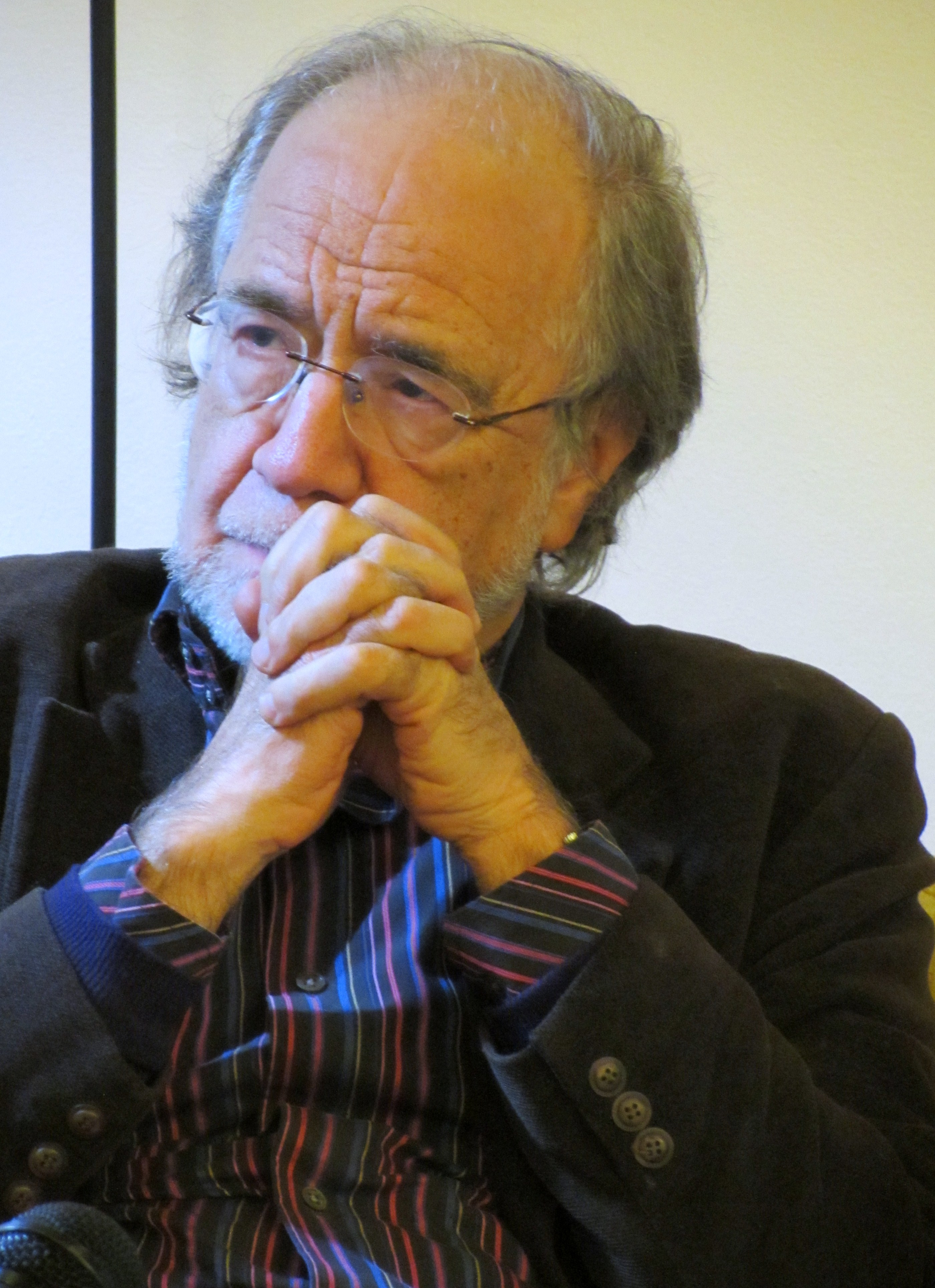
Manuel Antonio Garretón

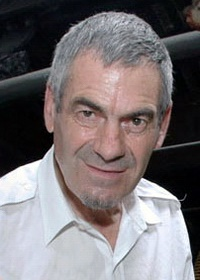
Jean Berlie

== Notable faculty ==
Past and present faculty (including EPHE's VIe Section):

- Marc Abélès
- Sylviane Agacinski
- Marc Augé
- Roland Barthes
- Claude Berge
- Augustin Berque
- Pierre Bourdieu
- François Bourguignon
- Jean Boutier
- Fernand Braudel
- Claude Calame
- Fernando Henrique Cardoso
- Manuel Castells
- Cornelius Castoriadis
- Roger Chartier
- Annie Cohen-Solal
- Jacques Derrida
- Philippe Descola
- Oswald Ducrot
- Louis Dumont
- Nicolas Ellison
- Moisés Espírito Santo
- Lucien Febvre
- Marc Ferro
- David Feuerwerker
- Maribel Fierro
- François Furet
- Marcel Gauchet
- Maurice Godelier
- Nilüfer Göle
- Algirdas Julien Greimas
- Roger Guesnerie
- Pierre Hadot
- Bernard Harcourt
- Stanley Hoffmann
- Olivier Jeanne
- Rainer Maria Kiesow
- Christiane Klapisch-Zuber
- Milan Kundera
- Jacques Lacan
- Marie-Claire Lavabre
- Jacques Le Goff
- Emmanuel Le Roy Ladurie
- Claude Lefort
- Pierre Manent
- Jacques Mehler
- Christian Metz
- Edgar Morin
- Thomas Piketty
- Richard Portes
- Ignacio Ramonet
- Juliette Rennes
- Pierre Rosenstiehl
- Emma Rothschild
- Olivier Roy
- Jean-Marie Schaeffer
- Jean-Claude Schmitt
- Carlo Severi
- Wiktor Stoczkowski
- Sanjay Subrahmanyam
- Jean Tirole
- Christian Topalov
- Alain Touraine
- Alessandro Triulzi
- Jean-Pierre Vernant
- Georges Vigarello
- Arundhati Virmani
- Eduardo Viveiros de Castro
- Alexander Vovin
- François Weil
- Michael Werner
- Michel Wieviorka
- Raphaël Zagury-Orly
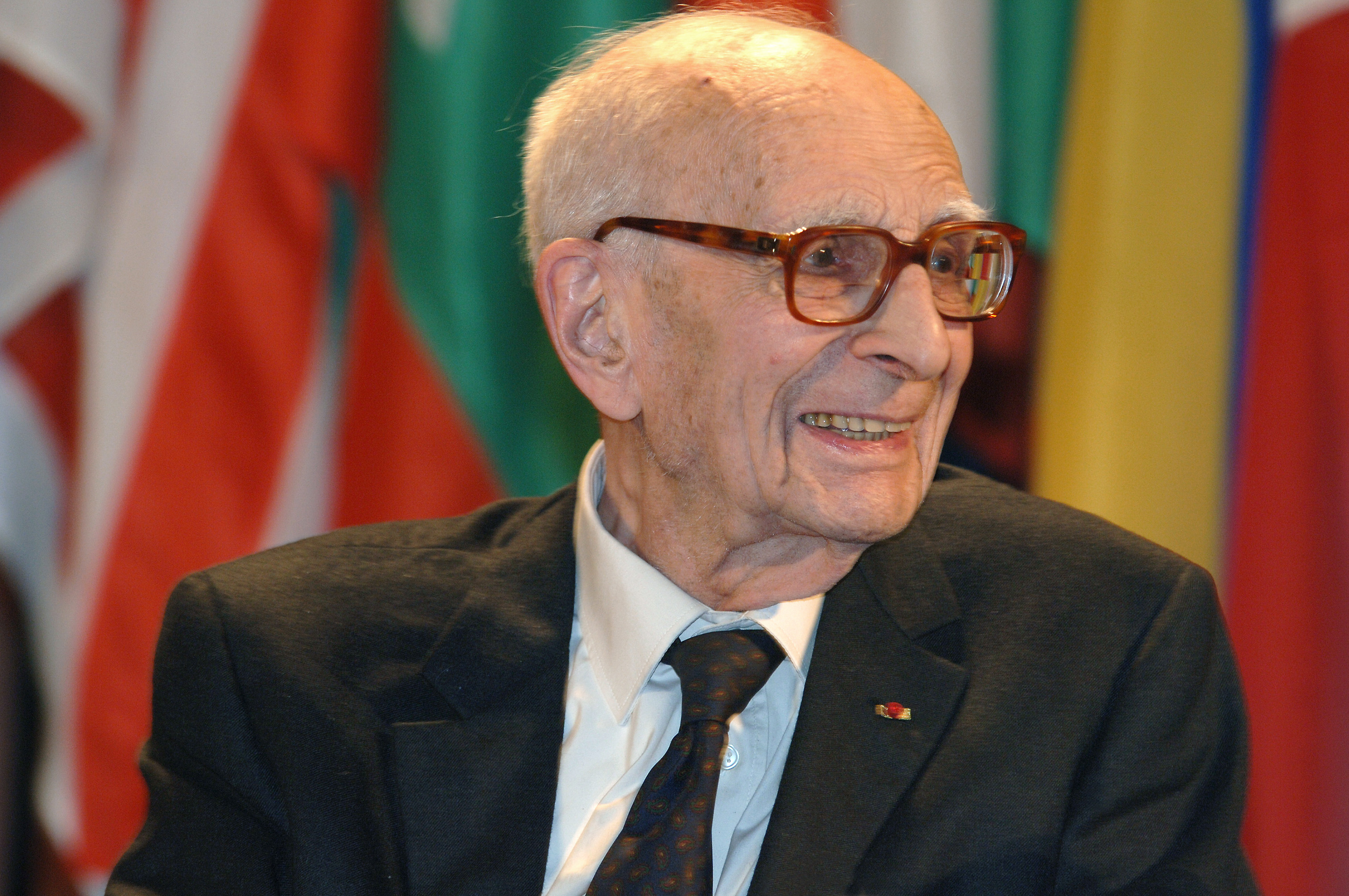
Claude Lévi-Strauss

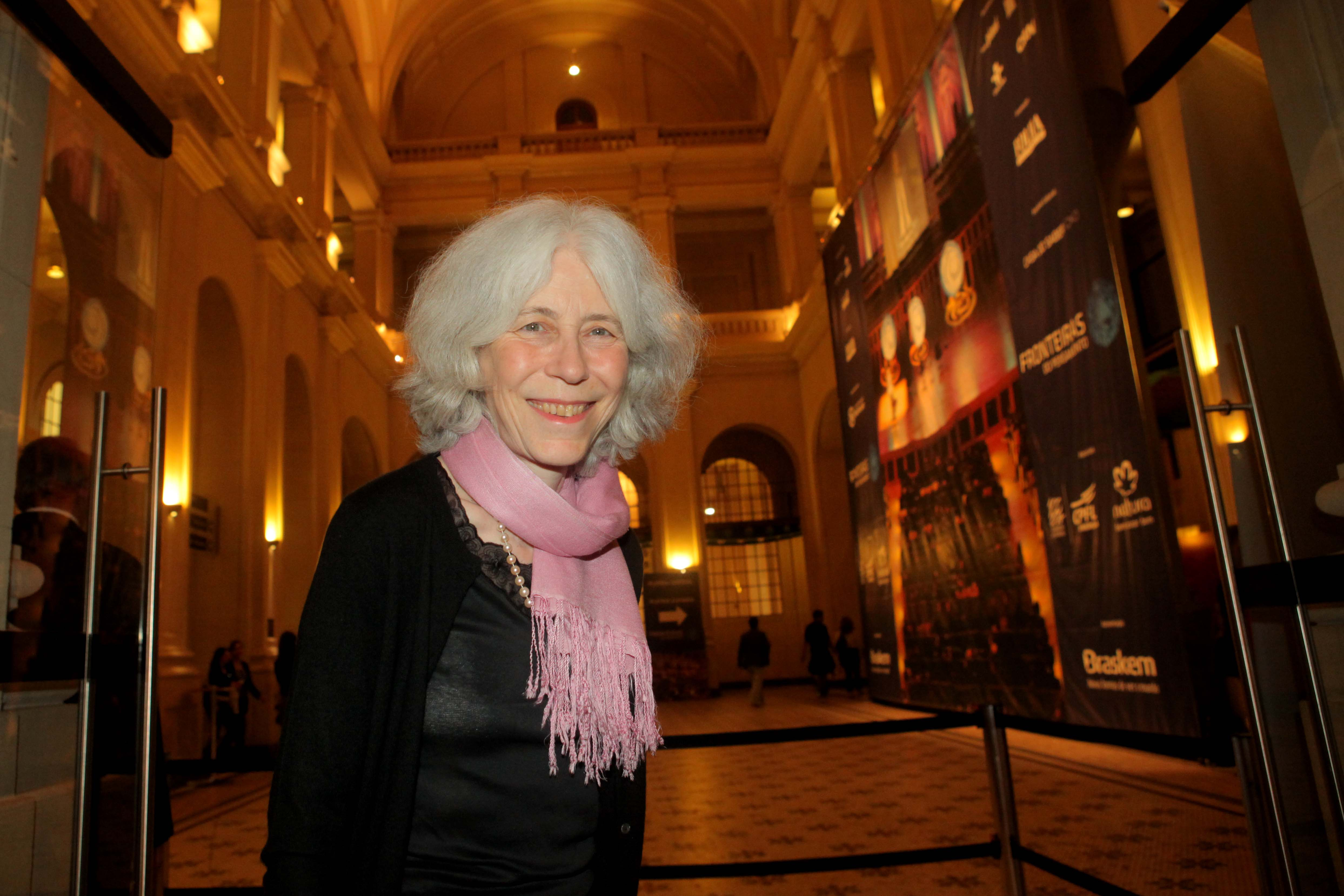
Emma Georgina Rothschild

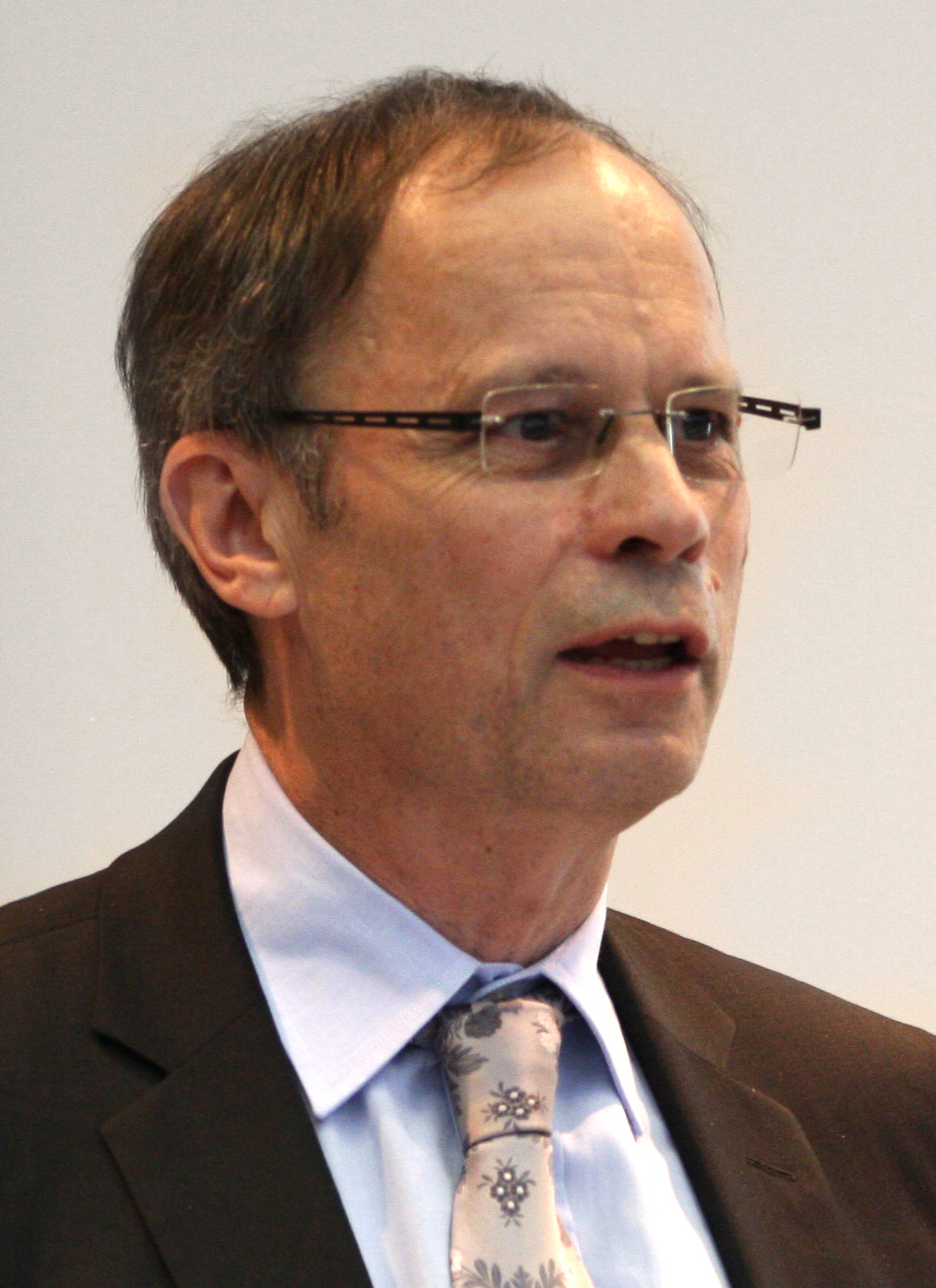
Jean Tirole

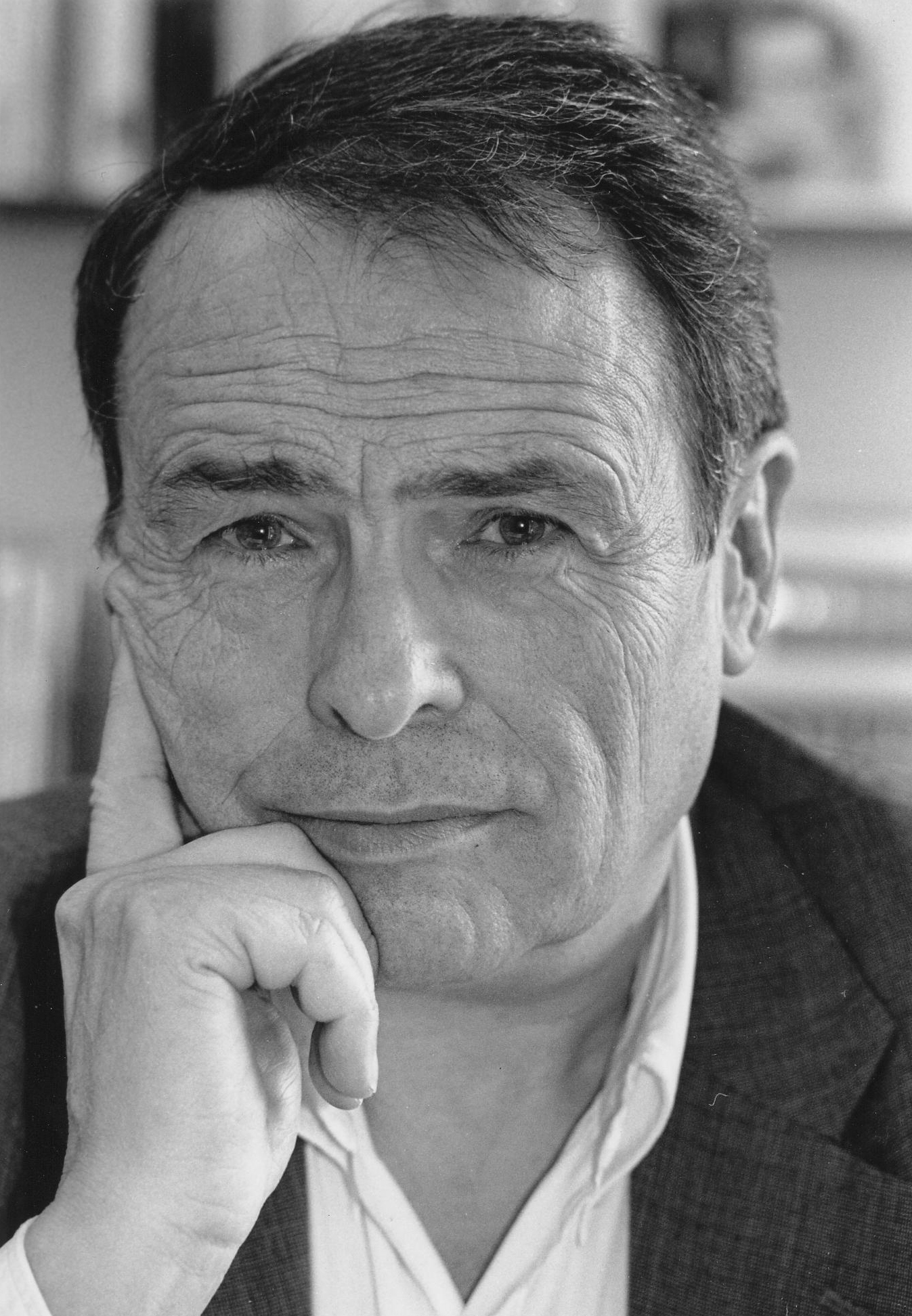
Pierre Bourdieu

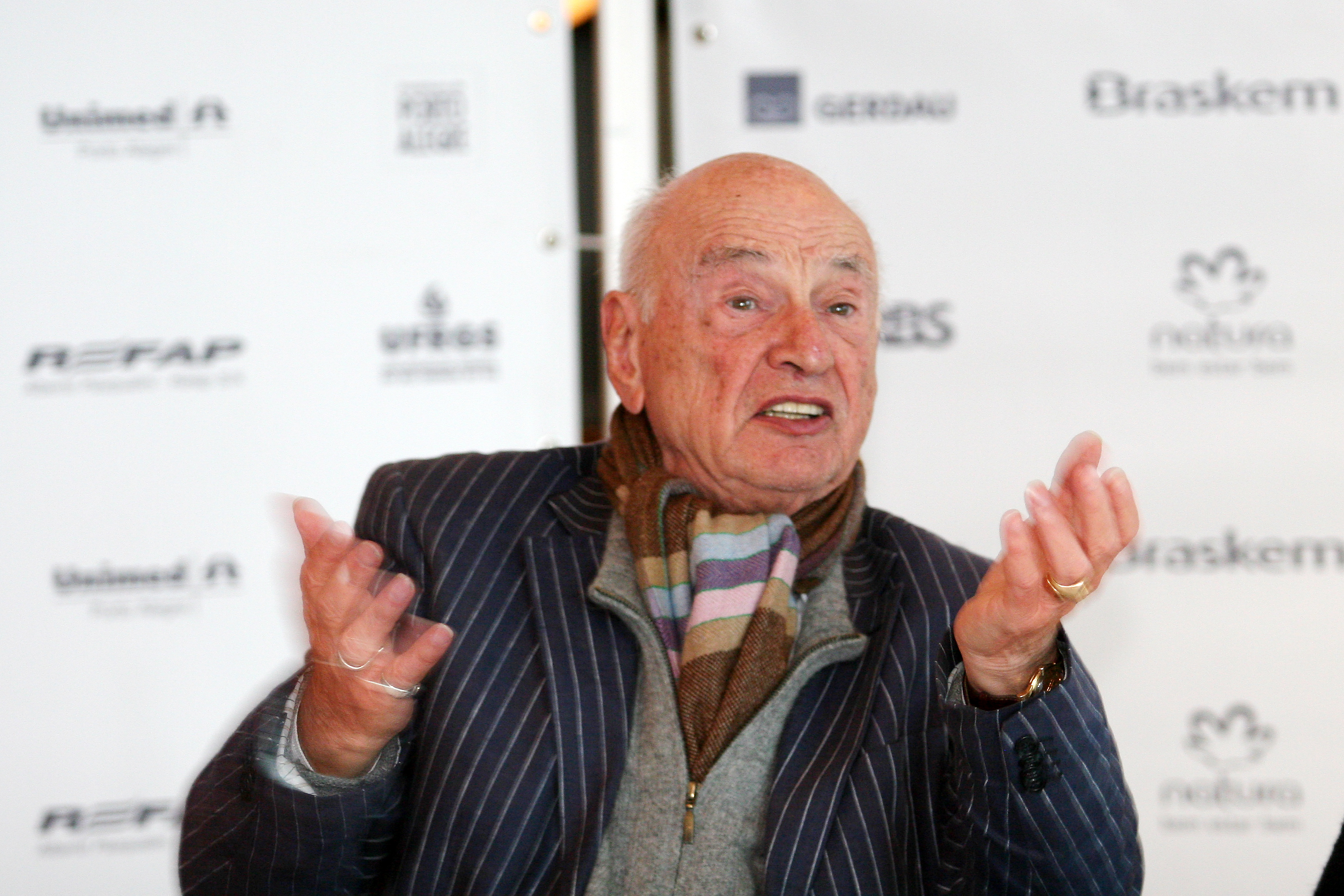
Edgar Morin

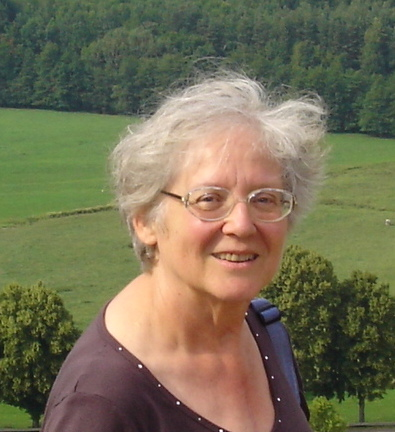
Christiane Klapisch-Zuber

== See also ==
- École libre des hautes études
- The New School for Social Research
- Paris Universitas
- Category:School for Advanced Studies in the Social Sciences alumni
- Category:Academic staff of the School for Advanced Studies in the Social Sciences
