= Jean-Marie Pesez =

French archaeologist (1929–1998)

Jean-Marie Pesez (1929–1998) was a French archaeologist and historian who studied rural civilization and medieval and preindustrial material culture.

Pesez became an aggregated professor in 1958. He served as the Director of Studies at the École pratique des hautes études. He served in the same position at the School for Advanced Studies in the Social Sciences starting in 1975. He was one of the pioneers of the comeback of medieval archeology in France in the 1960s and 1970s. His work helped popularize the study of material civilization and country life in the Middle Ages. Notably, he was the co-director of a French-Polish study on abandoned villages in Europe, which was part of historians' and archeologists' growing interest in rural living and country civilization. His new approach to archeology incorporated history, ethnography, and anthropology.

Between the 1960s and 1997, he educated many professional and amateur archeologists through his academic seminars at the School for Advanced Studies in the Social Sciences and excavations in France, Sicily, and Greece. He presided over the Conseil National de la Recherche Archéologique for many years.

== Bibliography ==
- Pesez (Jean-Marie), L'archéologie : mutations, missions, méthodes, Paris, Armand Colin, 2007, pp. 128
- Collectif, Le village médiéval et son environnement : études offertes à Jean-Marie Pesez, Paris, Publications de la Sorbonne, 1998, pp. 682 (bibliography)
- Pesez (Jean-Marie), Archéologie du village et de la maison rurale au Moyen Âge, Lyon, Presses universitaires de Lyon, 1998, pp. 515 (Complete collection of Pesez's articles)
- Pesez (Jean-Marie), "Histoire de la culture matérielle", in Jacques Le Goff (dir.), La nouvelle histoire, Paris, Retz, Encyclopédie moderne, 1978, pp. 98–130
- Pesez (Jean-Marie, dir. et coll.), Brucato : histoire et archéologie d'un habitat médiéval en Sicile, Rome, École française de Rome, 1978
