= Didier Lapeyronnie =

French sociologist (1956–2020)

- Born: 29 April 1956; Dordogne, France
- Died: 12 September 2020 (aged 64)
- Occupation: Sociologist

Didier Lapeyronnie (29 April 1956 – 12 September 2020) was a French sociologist and a professor at Paris-Sorbonne University. He was an associate member Centre d'analyse et d'intervention sociologiques, and of the Groupe d'étude des méthodes de l'analyse sociologique de la Sorbonne.

== Biography ==
Lapeyronnie served as a researcher at the French National Centre for Scientific Research from 1985 to 1992. He then became a professor of sociology at Bordeaux Segalen University. He served at Paris-Sorbonne University from 2007 until his death on 13 September 2020 at the age of 64.

== Bibliography ==
- L'État et les jeunes (1985)
- Les Quartiers d'exil (1992)
- Campus Blues. Les étudiants face à leurs études (1992)
- L'Individu et les Minorités. La France et la Grande-Bretagne face à leurs immigrés (1993)
- Le Grand Refus, réflexions sur la grève de décembre 1995 (1996)
- Ghetto urbain. Ségrégation, violence, pauvreté en France aujourd'hui (2008)
- Refaire la cité (2013)
