= Carlo Severi =

Italian anthropologist (born 1952)

Carlo Severi (born December 9, 1952) is an Italian anthropologist who is professor at the Ecole des Hautes Etudes en Sciences Sociales (EHESS). He is noted for his studies of ritual, image/imagination, and social memory

== Education ==
He studied philosophy at Università Statale, Milano, Italy where he obtained his master's degree (Laurea) in 1976 with a dissertation in anthropology ("Analyse du Mu Ikala: structure de la thérapie et idéologie du sujet dans un exemple de thérapie primitive (Cuna de Panama)"). During his PhD in anthropology at Ecole des Hautes Etudes en Sciences Sociales (EHESS), he was one of the last students of Claude Lévi-Strauss who was also one of the juries of his doctoral thesis ("Le traitement chamanique de la folie chez les Indiens Cuna de Panama") of the third cycle in social anthropology.

== Career ==
He is currently Director of Research, Chair in "Anthropology of the memory" at Ecole des Hautes Etudes en Sciences Sociales (EHESS) in Paris and Director of Research at Centre National de la Recherche Scientifique (CNRS) of France. He is also a member of the Laboratoire d'anthropologie sociale of Collège de France (LAS, founded in 1960 by Claude Lévi-Strauss) since 1985, and a member of the Department of Research in Museum quai Branly in Paris.

He has published many articles and books (Cf. ), including a key contribution to the study of ritual, Naven and the Other self: a relational approach to ritual action (with Michael Houseman). His most famous work was originally published in Italian as "Il percorso e la voce: un'antropologia della memoria" (Einaudi 2004) and later in French Le Principe de la chimère: Une anthropologie de la mémoire, (Presses de l'Ecole Normale Supérieure - Musée Branly 2007). A revised edition, "The Chimera Principle: an anthropology of memory and imagination" has been published in English in 2015 by HAU Books. He edited a number of seminal collections: a special issue of the journal L'Homme entitled "Image and anthropology" and a special issue of HAU: Journal of Ethnographic Theory (with Bill Hanks), Translating worlds: the epistemological space of translation.

From the year of 1978 to 1984, he received several scholarships and financial aid from Collège de France, Maison des Sciences de l'Homme and CNRS etc.

He was often invited as a visiting scholar or invited professor by overseas institutes and universities, such as King's College, Cambridge University (1990), Getty Research Center for the History of Art and the Humanities, Santa Monica, California (1994–1995), University of Heidelberg, Germany (2000), Johns Hopkins University Baltimore (2006), National Museum, University of Rio de Janeiro, Brazil (1991, 1995) etc.
