= Michel Wieviorka =

French sociologist

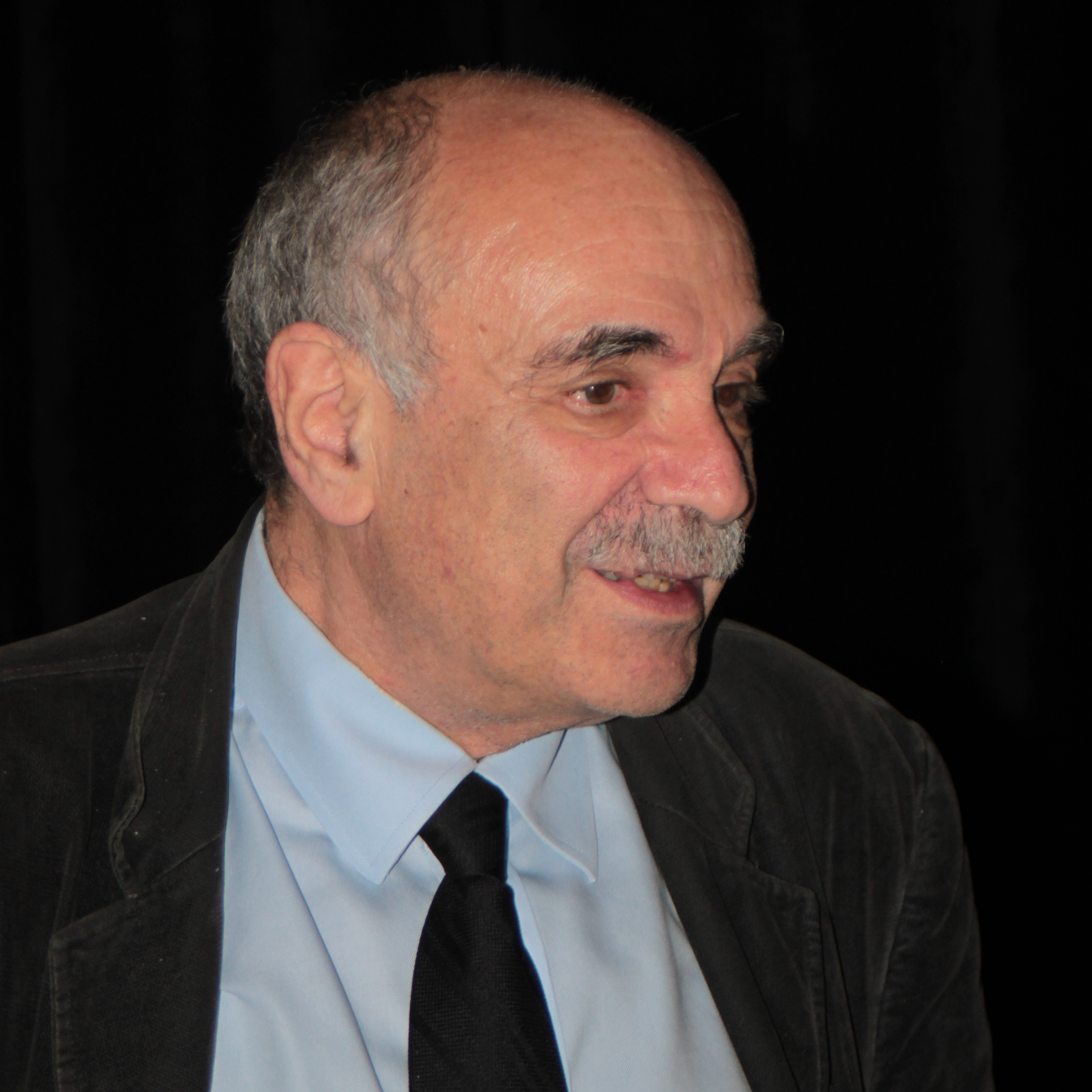
- Born: 23 August 1946 (age 79); Paris, France
- Education: ESCP Europe
- Occupation: Sociologist

Michel Wieviorka (born 23 August 1946) is a French sociologist, noted for his work on violence, terrorism, racism, social movements and the theory of social change.

He was the 16th president of International Sociological Association (2006–2010).

== Biography ==
Michel Wieviorka is the son of a Polish Jewish family of Holocaust survivors. His siblings are psychiatrist Sylvie Wieviorka, historian Annette Wieviorka, and historian Olivier Wieviorka.

A former student of Alain Touraine, he is now one of the most renowned sociologists and public intellectuals in France and abroad. A number of his books have been translated into different languages. Wieviorka received some international media attention as an expert following the 2005 civil unrest in France, and was elected in Durban as the 2006-2010 President of the International Sociological Association.

Together with Touraine and François Dubet, Wieviorka developed the method of intervention sociologique and employed it to the study of militant social movements, in particular French anti-nuclear activism and student leagues, but also the famous trade union Solidarność in Poland. Following Max Weber's classic concept of interpretative sociology (verstehende Soziologie), intervention sociologique aims at understanding the subjective rationale of actors in the context of larger social conflicts. This concept was opposed to Raymond Boudon's failed attempt to establish a strict rational choice approach in French sociology.

Wieviorka is the director of the Centre d'Analyses et d'Interventions Sociologique (CADIS) at the School for Advanced Studies in the Social Sciences, which was established by Alain Touraine in 1981.

Wieviorka is the founder and editor of the sociological journal Le Monde des Debats and was, with Georges Balandier, co-edited the Cahiers internationaux de sociologie until its publication was stopped at the end of 2010 (Avant-propos, Cahiers Internationaux de Sociologie, Vol. 128-129, 2010).

In 1989, he was the first scholar to receive the Bulzoni Editore Special Award of the European Amalfi Prize for Sociology and Social Sciences, for his book Société et terrorisme (1988, English edition The Making of Terrorism 1993).

== Works ==
- 1977: L'Etat, le patronat et les consommateurs. Paris: PUF.
- 1978: Justice et consommation. Paris, La Documentation française.
- 1978 (with Bruno Théret): Critique de la théorie du capitalisme monopoliste d'Etat. Paris: Maspéro.
- 1978 (with Alain Touraine, François Dubet, Zsuzsa Hegedus): Lutte étudiante. Paris: Seuil.
- 1978 (with Alain Touraine, François Dubet, Zsuzsa Hegedus): La prophétie antinucléaire. Paris: Seuil.
- 1981 (with Alain Touraine, François Dubet, Zsuzsa Hegedus): Le pays contre l'Etat. Paris: Seuil.
- 1982 "A Social Movement: Solidarity". Telos 53 (Fall 1982). New York: Telos Press.
- 1982 (with Alain Touraine, François Dubet, Jan Strzelecki): Solidarité. Paris: Fayard.
- 1984: Les Juifs, la Pologne et Solidarnosc. Paris: Denoël. ISBN 2-7158-1534-4
- 1984: (with Alain Touraine, François Dubet): Le mouvement ouvrier. Paris: Fayard.
  (English translation The Working-Class Movement, Cambridge: Cambridge University Press, 1987)
- 1987 (with Dominique Wolton): Terrorisme à la une : Média, terrorisme et démocratie. Paris: Gallimard. ISBN 2-07-071135-8
- 1988: Sociétés et terrorisme. Paris: Fayard. ISBN 2-213-02206-2
  (English translation The Making of Terrorism. Chicago: University of Chicago Press, 1993, ISBN 0-226-89652-8)
- 1989 (with Sylvaine Trinh): Le modèle EDF. Essai de sociologie des organisations. Paris: La Découverte. ISBN 2-7071-1867-2
- 1991: L'espace du racisme. Paris: Seuil. ISBN 2-02-012567-6
  (English translation The Arena of Racism. London: Sage. ISBN 0-8039-7881-2)
- 1992 (with Philippe Bataille, Daniel Jacquin, Danilo Martuccelli, Angelina Peralva, Paul Zawadzki): La France raciste. Paris: Seuil ISBN 2-02-019603-4
- 1993: La Démocratie à l'épreuve : Nationalisme, populisme, ethnicité. Paris: La Découverte. ISBN 2-7071-2271-8
- 1993 (ed.): Racisme et modernité. Paris: La Découverte. ISBN 2-7071-2190-8
- 1994 (with Philippe Bataille, Kristin Couper, Danilo Martuccelli, Angelina Peralva): Racisme et xénophobie en Europe. Une comparaison internationale. Paris: La Découverte. ISBN 2-7071-2343-9
- 1995: Face au terrorisme. Paris: Liana Levi. ISBN 2-86746-136-7
- 1995: Laïcité et démocratie. (Pouvoirs). Paris: Seuil
- 1998: Le Racisme : une introduction. Paris: La Découverte. ISBN 2-7071-2866-X
- 1996 (with Alain Touraine, François Dubet, Farhad Khosrokhavar, Didier Lapeyronnie): Le grand refus. Paris: Fayard.
- 1996 (with François Dubet, Françoise Gaspard, Farhad Khosrokhavar, Didier Lapyeronnie, Yvon Le Bot, Danilo Martuccelli, Simonetta Tabboni, Alain Touraine, Sylvaine Trinh): Une société fragmentée? Le multiculturalisme en débat. Paris: La Découverte. ISBN 2-7071-2597-0
- 1997: Commenter la France. La Tour d'Aigues: l'Aube. ISBN 2-87678-320-7
- 1998 (with Serge Moscovici, Nicole Notat, fr:Pierre Pachet, Michelle Perrot): Raison et conviction. L'engagement. Paris: Textuel. ISBN 2-909317-52-8
- 1998: Le racisme : une introduction. Paris: La Découverte.
- 1998 (with Alexis Berelowitch): Les Russes d'en bas. Enquête sur la Russie post-communiste. Paris: Seuil. ISBN 2-02-026182-0
- 1999 (with Philippe Bataille, Karine Clément, Olivier Cousin, Farhad Khosrokhavar, Séverine Labat, Eric Macé, Paola Rebughini, Nikola Tietze): Violence en France. Paris: Seuil.
- 2001: La différence : Identités culturelles : enjeux, débats et politiques. Paris: Balland.
- 2001 (with Jocelyne Ohana): La différence culturelle. Une reformulation des débats. Paris: Balland.
- 2003 (ed.): L'avenir de l'islam en France et en Europe. (Les Entretiens d'Auxerre). Paris: Balland. ISBN 2-7158-1463-1
- 2003 (ed.): Un autre monde... Contestations, dérives et surprises de l'antimondialisation. Paris: Balland
- 2004: La violence. Paris: Balland. ISBN 2-01-279227-8
- 2004 (ed.): L'Empire américain? (Les Entretiens d'Auxerre). Paris: Balland. ISBN 2-7158-1512-3
- 2005: La différence : Identités culturelles : enjeux, débats et politiques. La Tour-d'Aigues: L'Aube. ISBN 2-7526-0067-4
- 2005 (with Philippe Bataille, Clarisse Buono, Sébastien Delsalle, Damien Guillaume, Farhad Khosrokhavar, Emmanuel Kreis, Jocelyne Ohana, Alexandra Poli, Svetlana Tabatchnikova, Simonetta Tabboni, Nikola Tietze, Fiammeta Venner): La tentation antisémite. Haine des juifs dans la France d'aujourd'hui. Paris: Robert Laffont. ISBN 2-01-279301-0
- 2005: L'antisémitisme. Paris: Balland. ISBN 2-7158-1534-4
- 2005 (ed. with Jean Baubérot): De la séparation des Eglises et de l'Etat à l'avenir de la laïcité (Les entretiens d'Auxerre). La Tour d'Aigues: l'Aube. ISBN 2-7526-0152-2
- 2006 (with Julien Ténédos): Sociologue sous tension. Entretien avec Julien Ténédos, 2 volumes, Paris: Aux lieux d'être. ISBN 2-916063-07-2 / ISBN 2-916063-10-2
