= Alain Touraine =

French sociologist (1925–2023)

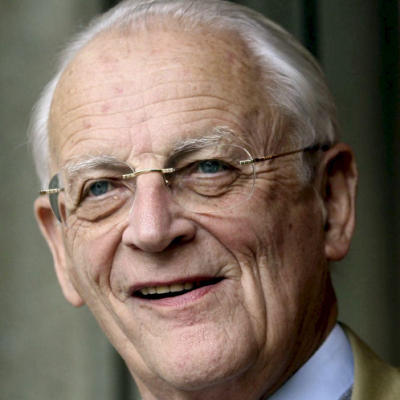
- Born: 3 August 1925; Hermanville-sur-Mer, France
- Died: 9 June 2023 (aged 97); Paris, France
- Education: Lycée Louis-le-Grand
- Alma mater: École Normale Supérieure; University of Paris
- Occupation: Sociologist
- Employer(s): CNRS; EHESS; Paris Nanterre University
- Known for: Actionalism
- Spouse: Adriana Arenas
- Relatives: Marisol Touraine (daughter)
- Scientific career
- Doctoral advisor: Raymond Aron
- Doctoral students: Manuel Castells

Alain Touraine (French: [alɛ̃ tuʁɛn]; 3 August 1925 – 9 June 2023) was a French sociologist. He was research director at the École des Hautes Études en Sciences Sociales, where he founded the Centre d'étude des mouvements sociaux. Touraine was an important figure in the founding of French sociology of work after World War II and later became a sociologist of social movements, particularly the May 68 student movement in France and the Solidarity trade-union movement in communist Poland.

== Biography ==
Touraine completed his khâgne (preparatory school) at the Lycée Louis-le-Grand in Paris, and entered the École Normale Supérieure (ENS) in 1945. He left his studies at the ENS for a research trip in Hungary and then worked at a mine in Valenciennes in 1947–1948 after his return to France. Touraine's work in the industrial milieu and his simultaneous discovery of the sociologist Georges Friedmann's Problèmes humains du machinisme industriel led him to return to studies in history at the ENS and to pass the agrégation in history in 1950.

The same year, he became a researcher in sociology at the CNRS, working in the new subfield of the sociology of work under Friedmann. Touraine conducted field research at the Renault auto factory in Boulogne-Billancourt in Paris, which would lead to his first sociological monograph, published in 1955. In 1952, he received a grant from the Rockefeller Foundation to study at Harvard with Talcott Parsons.

Touraine defended his two doctoral theses at the University of Paris in 1964. His major thesis was published as Sociologie de l'action in 1965, and his minor thesis as La conscience ouvrière in 1966, both by Éditions du Seuil.

Touraine was the father of two children: Marisol, who served as the French Minister of Social Affairs and Health from 2012 to 2017 in the government of Jean-Marc Ayrault and Manuel Valls; and Philippe, a professor of endocrinology at the Pitié-Salpêtrière hospital in Paris.

Touraine died in Paris on 9 June 2023, at the age of 97.

== Work ==
Part of the first generation of French sociologues du travail after World War II, Touraine was a pioneer of sociological fieldwork in industrial settings in France, drawing on the influence of American industrial sociology and industrial relations, as well as the survey research of Paul Lazarsfeld. Touraine's 1955 study of Renault articulated the "ABC" theory of automation which was adopted by 1960s radical sociologists of the "new working class," including Serge Mallet.

Touraine's mature work after 1960 is based on a "sociology of action", which he called "actionalism", and believes that society shapes its future through structural mechanisms and its own social struggles. Expressed in his first theoretical statement, Sociologie de l'action, Touraine conceived "actionalism" as an alternative to the functionalism of Talcott Parsons, toward which he had frequently expressed disdain throughout his career.

Touraine was a professor of sociology at Nanterre when the student movement of May 1968 broke out on its campus. Touraine observed the movement on the ground and wrote one of the first studies of it; 1968 marked a transition in his work away from labor and the working class toward social movements. Touraine, who in his 1960s work had been a major theorist of "industrial society," published one of the first books articulating a concept of "post-industrial society" in 1969, though the American sociologists Daniel Bell and David Riesman had already been using the term.

His prime interest for most of his career has been with social movements. He had studied and written extensively on workers' movements across the world, particularly in Latin America and Poland—where he observed the emergence of the dissident movement Solidarnosc. While in Poland, he developed the research method of "sociological intervention," which had been outlined in The Voice and the Eye (La Voix et le Regard) [1981].

Grave of Alain Touraine

Touraine has gained popularity in Latin America as well as in continental Europe. He has failed to gain the same recognition in the English-speaking world, although half of his books have been translated into English. He participated in 1969 at the Universitas project organized by Argentine architect Emilio Ambasz.

== Honours and awards ==
In 2007, he was appointed honorary doctor of the Open University of Catalonia. In 2010, he was jointly awarded, with Zygmunt Bauman, the Príncipe de Asturias Prize for Communication and the Humanities. Touraine received the Legion of Honour in 2014 during his daughter Marisol’s mandate as French Minister of Social Affairs.

- Commandeur of the Order of Legion of Honour
- Officier of the Ordre National du Mérite
- Commandeur of the Order of Merit of the Republic of Poland

== Selected publications ==
- Touraine, A. (1965) Sociologie de l'action. Paris: Seuil.
- Touraine, A. (1966) La conscience ouvrière. Paris: Seuil.
- Touraine, A. (1968) Le mouvement de mai ou le communisme utopique. Paris: Seuil.
- Touraine, A. (1969) La société post-industrielle. Paris: Seuil.
- Touraine, A. (1971). The Post-Industrial Society. Tomorrow's Social History: Classes, Conflicts and Culture in the Programmed Society. New York: Random House.
- Touraine, A. (1977). The Self-Production of Society. Chicago: The University of Chicago Press.
- Touraine, A. (1981). The Voice and the Eye: An Analysis of Social Movements. Cambridge: Cambridge University Press.
- Dubet, F., A. Touraine and M. Wieviorka (1983). Solidarity: The Analysis of a Social Movement: Poland 1980-1981. Cambridge: Cambridge University Press.
- Touraine, A. (1995). Critique of Modernity. Oxford: Blackwell.
- Touraine, A. (1999). "Chapter 9: Society Turns Back Upon Itself." The Blackwell Reader in Contemporary Social Theory. Ed. Anthony Elliott. New York: John Wiley & Sons, Incorporated, 1999.
- Touraine, A. (2000). Can We Live Together?: Equality and Difference. Stanford, Calif.: Stanford University Press.
- Touraine, A. (2006). Le Monde des Femmes. Paris: Fayard.
- Touraine, A. (2007). New Paradigm for Understanding Today's World. Cambridge, Malden: Polity.
- Touraine, A. (2009). Thinking Differently. Cambridge, Malden: Polity.
